= 117th United States Congress =

2021–2023 meeting of U.S. legislature

←	116th	118th	→
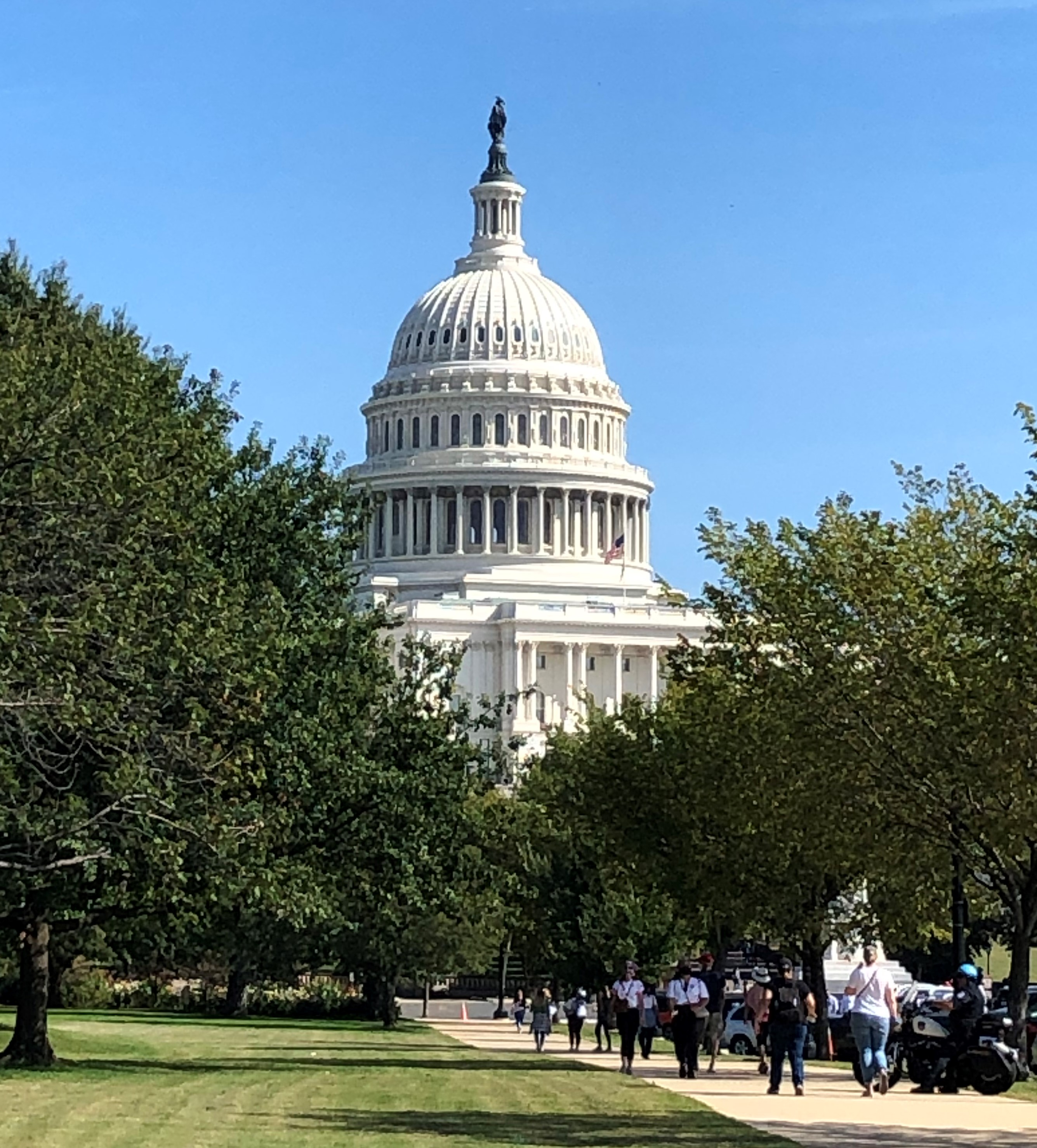
- United States Capitol (2021)

Overview
- Legislative body: United States Congress
- Jurisdiction: United States
- Term: January 3, 2021 – January 3, 2023

Senate
- Members: 100
- President: Mike Pence (R) (Note: U.S. Vice President Mike Pence's term as President of the Senate ended at noon January 20, 2021, when Kamala Harris's term began.) (until January 20, 2021); Kamala Harris (D) (from January 20, 2021)
- Party control: Republican (until January 20, 2021); Democratic (with tie-breaking VP and through caucus) (from January 20, 2021)

House of Representatives
- Members: 435 representatives 6 non-voting delegates
- Speaker: Nancy Pelosi (D)
- Party control: Democratic

Sessions
- 1st: January 3, 2021 – January 3, 2022
- 2nd: January 3, 2022 – January 3, 2023

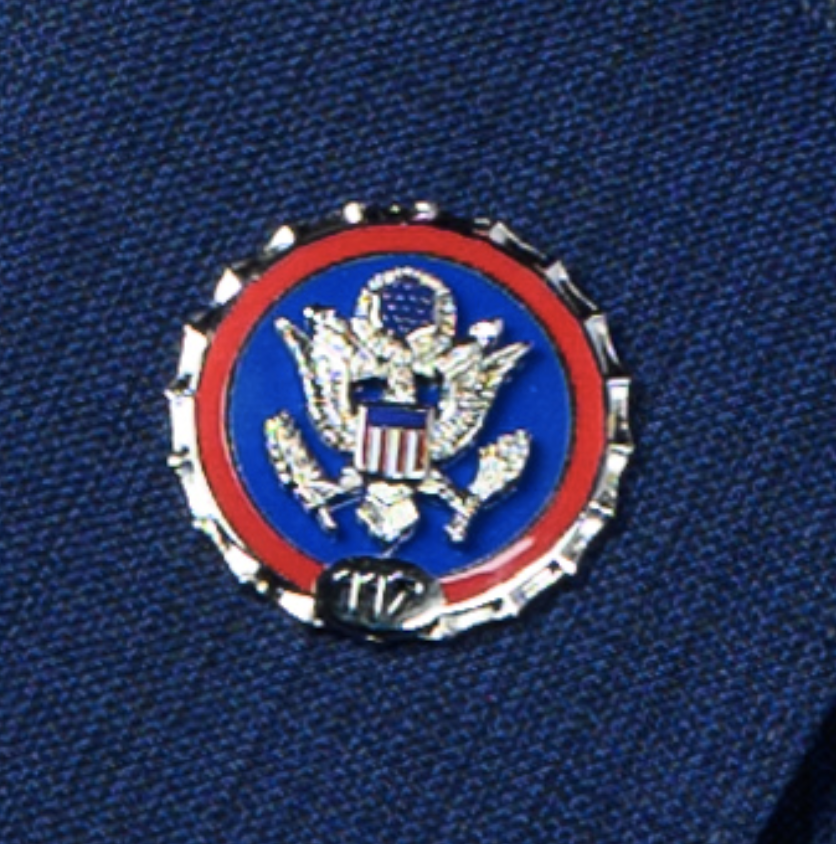
117th U.S. Congress House of Representatives member pin

The 117th United States Congress was a meeting of the legislative branch of the United States federal government, composed of the United States Senate and the United States House of Representatives. It convened in Washington, D.C., on January 3, 2021, during the final weeks of Donald Trump's first presidency and the first two years of Joe Biden's presidency and ended on January 3, 2023.

The 2020 elections decided control of both chambers. In the House of Representatives, the Democratic Party retained their majority, albeit reduced from the 116th Congress. It was similar in size to the majority held by the Republican Party during the 83rd Congress (1953–1955).

In the Senate, Republicans briefly held the majority at the start; however, on January 20, 2021, three new Democratic senators – Jon Ossoff and Raphael Warnock of Georgia and Alex Padilla of California – were sworn in, resulting in 50 seats held by Republicans, 48 seats held by Democrats, and two held by independents who caucus with the Democrats. Effectively, this created a 50–50 split, which had not occurred since the 107th Congress in 2001. This was only the third time in U.S. history that the Senate had been evenly split, and the longest-lasting one ever.

The new senators were sworn into office by Vice President Kamala Harris, just hours after her inauguration. With Harris serving as the tie breaker in her constitutional role as President of the Senate, Democrats gained control of the Senate, and thereby full control of Congress for the first time since the 111th Congress ended in 2011. Additionally, with the inauguration of Joe Biden as president that same day, Democrats assumed control of the executive branch as well, attaining an overall federal government trifecta, also for the first time since the 111th Congress.

Despite Democrats holding thin majorities in both chambers during a period of intense political polarization, the 117th Congress oversaw the passage of numerous significant bills, including the Inflation Reduction Act, American Rescue Plan Act, Infrastructure Investment and Jobs Act, Postal Service Reform Act, Bipartisan Safer Communities Act, CHIPS and Science Act, Honoring Our PACT Act, Electoral Count Reform and Presidential Transition Improvement Act, and Respect for Marriage Act.

== Major events ==
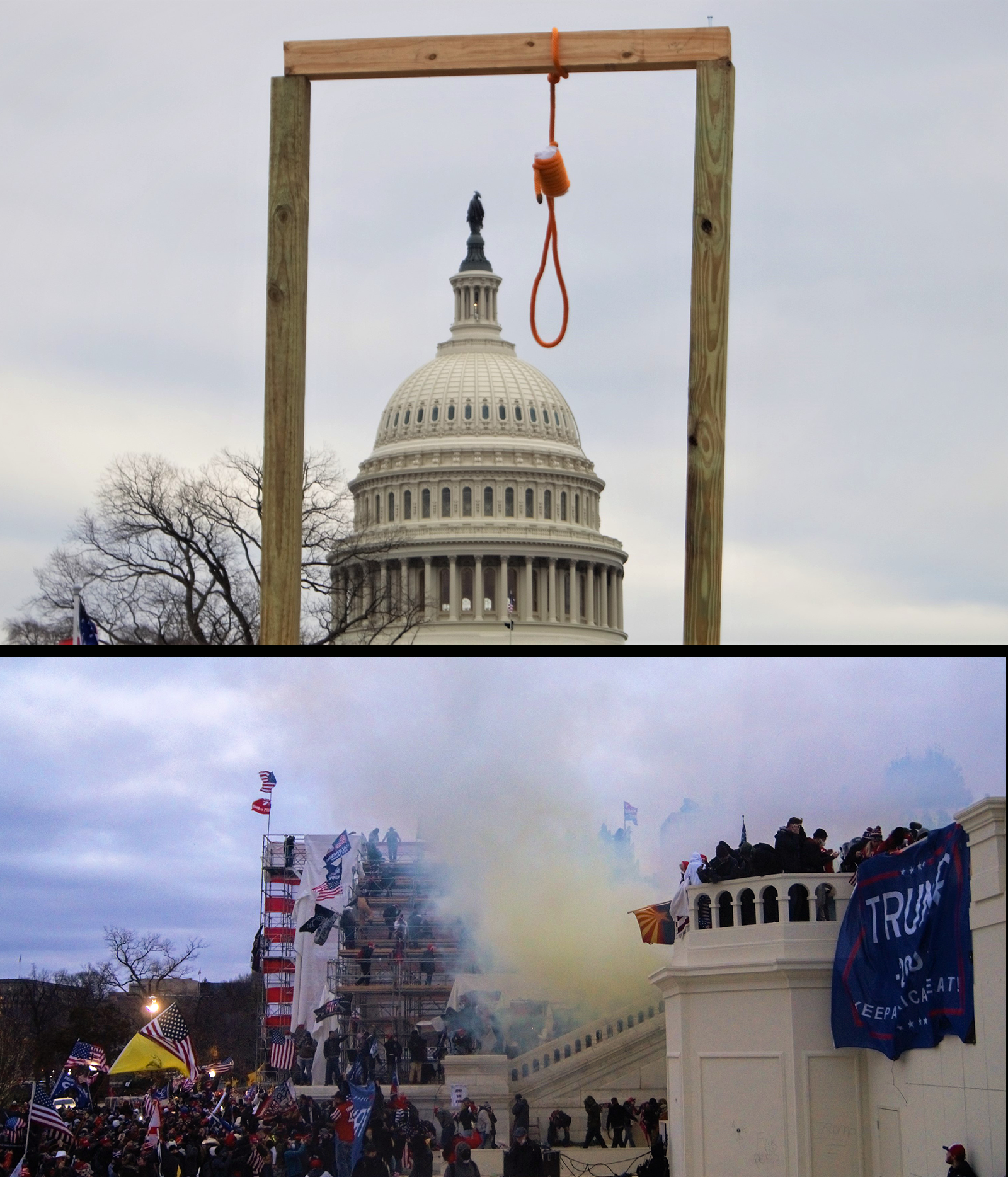
January 6 United States Capitol attack (January 6, 2021)

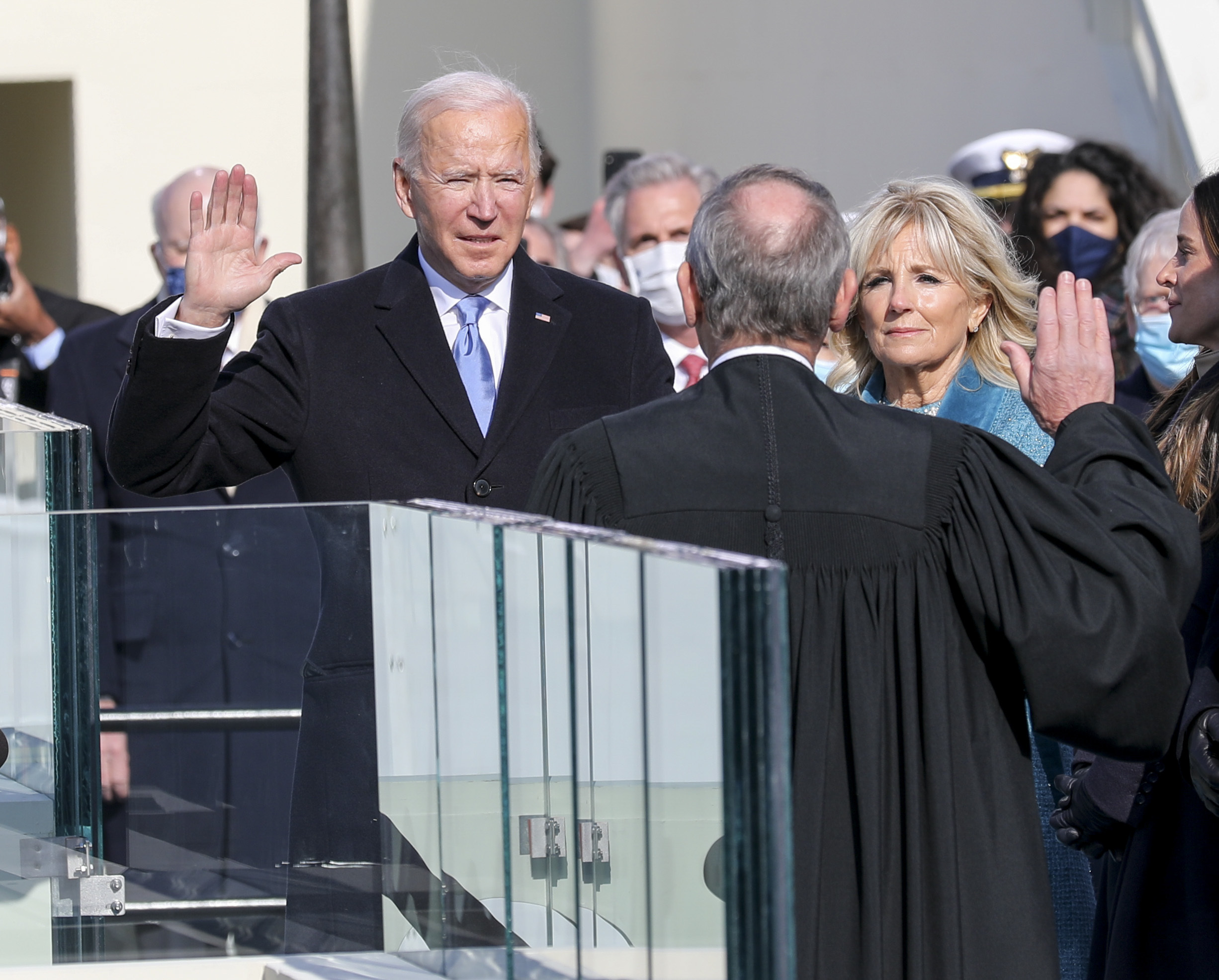
Joe Biden takes the oath of office as the 46th president of the United States.

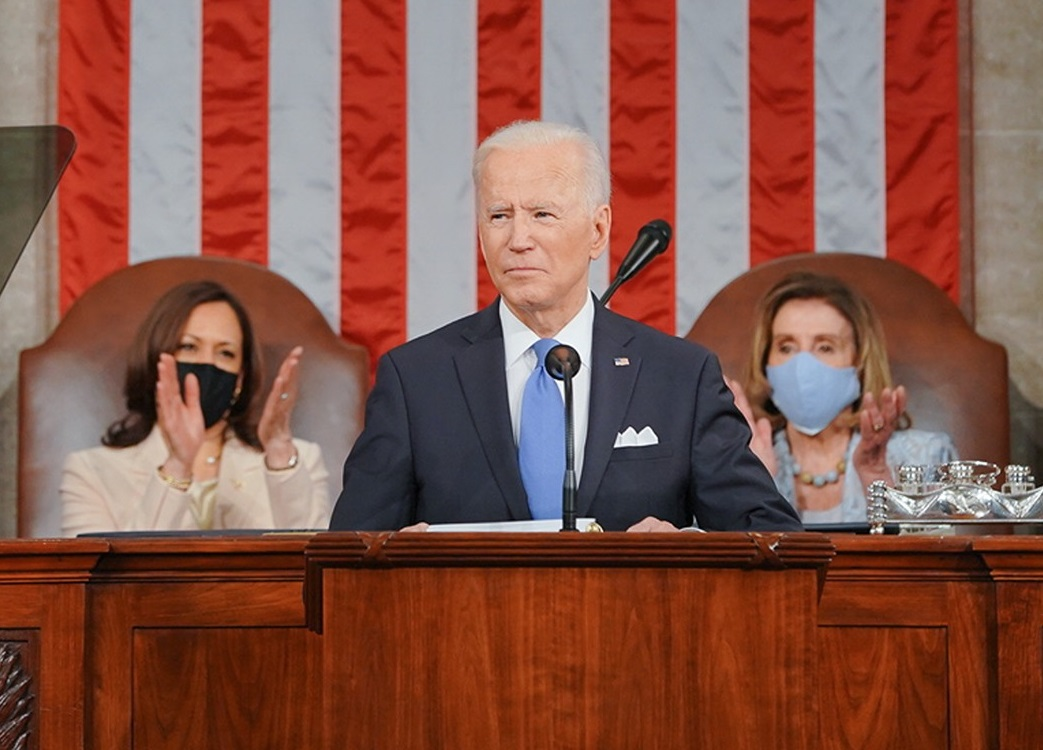
President Biden during his 2021 speech to a joint session of Congress, with Vice President Kamala Harris and House Speaker Nancy Pelosi.

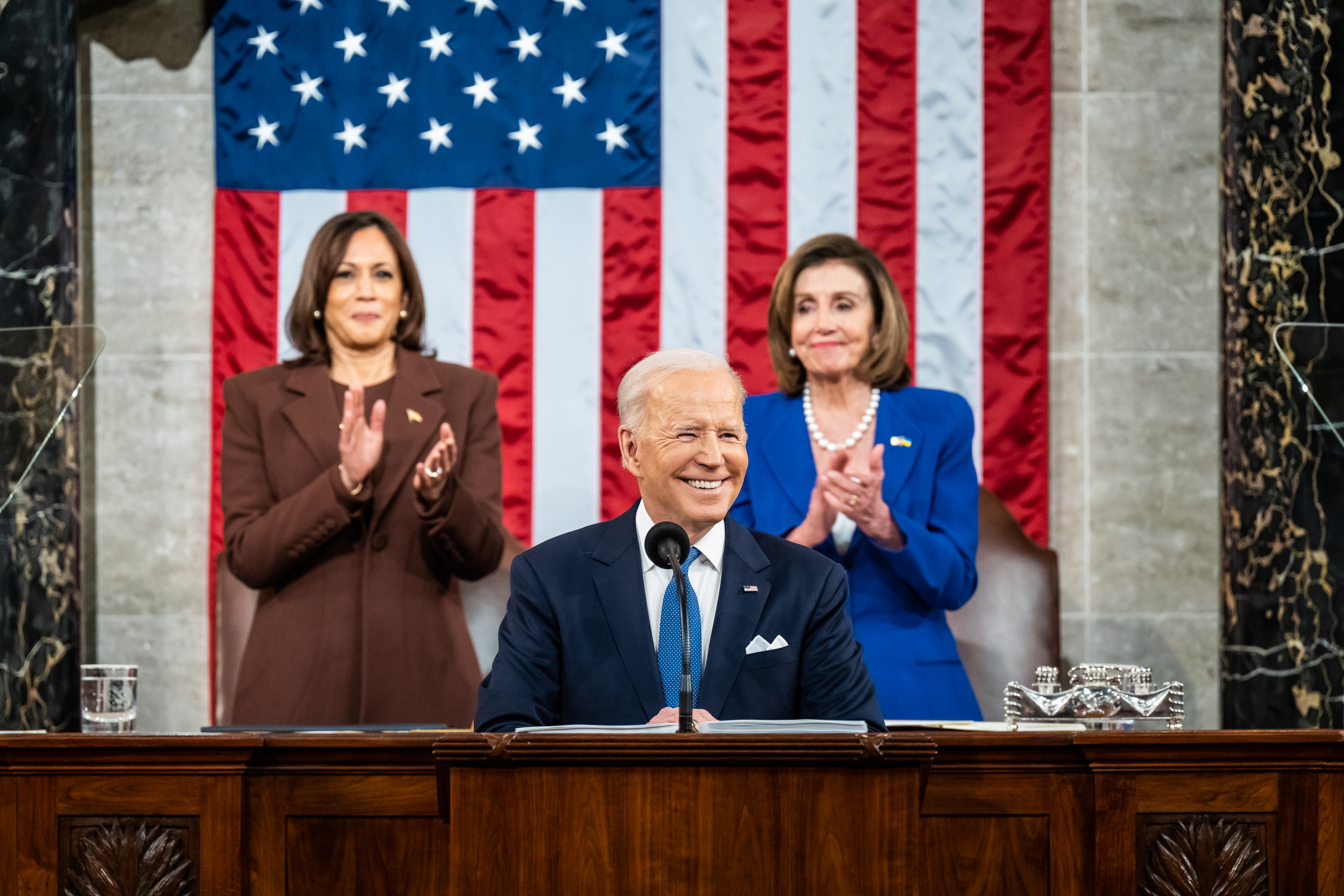
President Biden during his 2022 State of the Union Address, with Vice President Harris and House Speaker Pelosi.

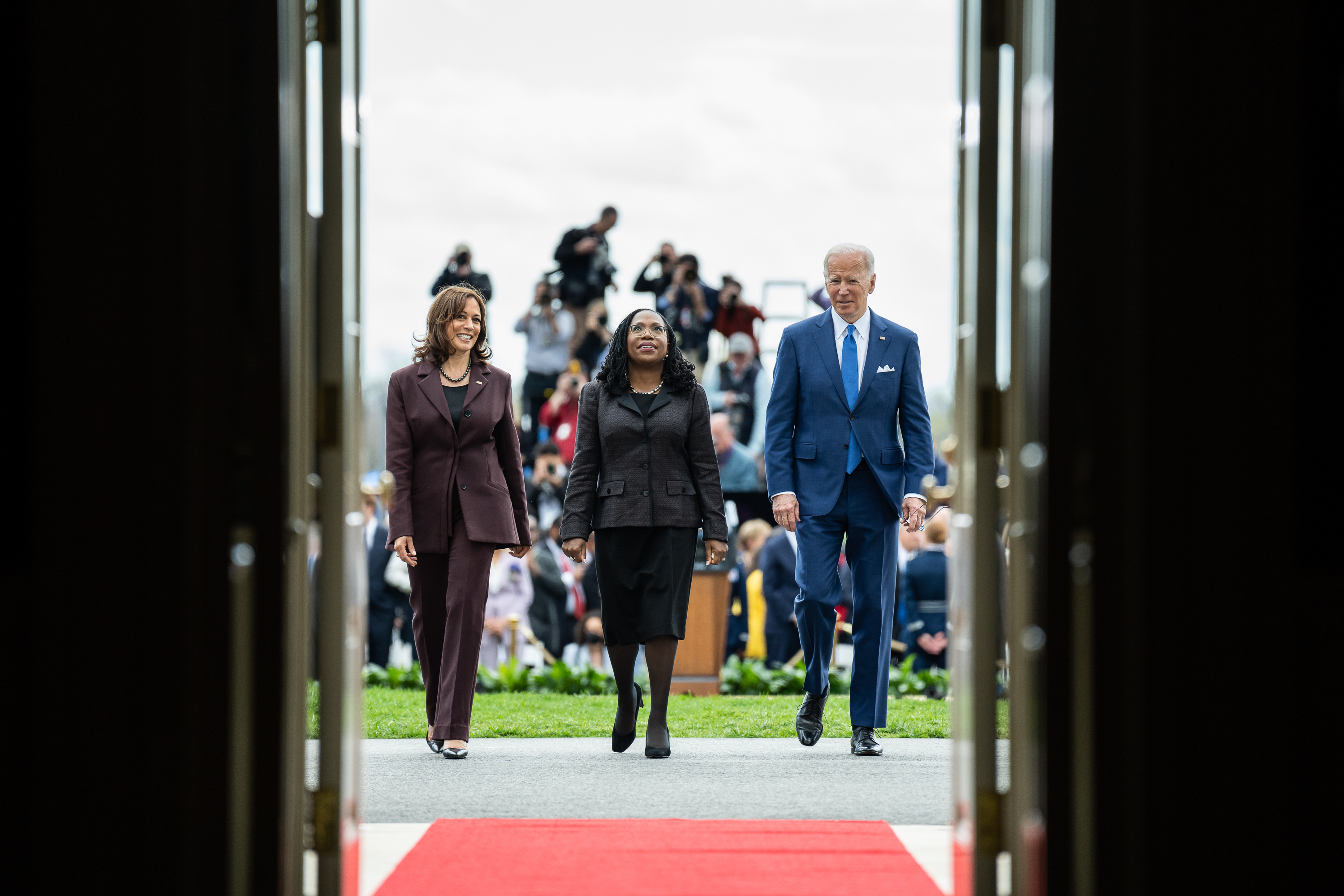
Justice Ketanji Brown Jackson shortly after she was confirmed by the United States Senate, joined by President Biden and Vice President Harris.

- January 3, 2021: 117th Congress officially begins. Members-elect of the United States Senate and the United States House of Representatives are sworn in; though because of the COVID-19 pandemic, House members-elect did not all gather in the chamber to be sworn in, but rather, were summoned to the chambers in seven groups of about 72 people.
- January 5, 2021: Runoff elections were held in Georgia for the regular and special Senate elections, with Democrats winning both and gaining control of the Senate upon Kamala Harris's inauguration.
- January 6–7, 2021: A joint session to count the presidential Electoral College votes is held. It was halted when pro-Trump mob attacked the Capitol. By nightfall, the mob had been cleared and the vote counting resumed, with the certification being made official around 3:00 a.m. on January 7.
- January 13, 2021: Second impeachment of Donald Trump: House impeached President Trump for inciting the January 6 attack on the Capitol.
- January 20, 2021: The inauguration of Joe Biden takes place.
- January 20, 2021: With Vice President Kamala Harris's inauguration, alongside the seating of three new Democratic senators (Ossoff, Warnock, Padilla – the two Georgia runoff winners and Harris's appointed replacement), Democrats take control of the Senate with a 50–50 split and Harris served as the tiebreaker in her role as Senate President. The Democrats gain a trifecta.
- January 25, 2021: House Democrats formally send an article of impeachment against former president Donald Trump to the Senate.
- February 3, 2021: Senate organizing resolution passed, allowing Democrats to control committees and freshman senators to take committee appointments.
- February 4, 2021: House voted 230–199 on H.Res. 72, removing Representative Marjorie Taylor Greene of Georgia's 14th congressional district from the House committees on Education and Labor and the Budget.
- February 9–13, 2021: The Second impeachment trial of Donald Trump takes place.
- April 2, 2021: April 2021 United States Capitol car attack
- April 13, 2021: Officer Billy Evans lies in state in the U.S. Capitol.
- April 22, 2021: House voted 216–208 on H.R. 51 to make Washington, D.C. the nation's 51st state.
- April 28, 2021: President Joe Biden addresses a joint session of Congress.
- May 12, 2021: House Republicans vote to oust Liz Cheney as conference chair for criticizing Donald Trump and opposing his attempts to reject the results of the 2020 election.
- May 14, 2021: Elise Stefanik is elected House Republican Conference chair.
- June 17, 2021: Juneteenth becomes the first newly created federal holiday since 1983.
- October 21, 2021: House voted 229–202 on H.Res. 730 to hold former President Donald Trump chief strategist Steve Bannon in criminal contempt of Congress for his refusal to comply with the House Select Committee investigation on the January 6 attack.
- November 17, 2021: House voted 223–207 on H.Res. 789 to censure Representative Paul Gosar of Arizona's 4th congressional district and remove him from the House committees on Oversight and Natural Resources for posting an anime video of him killing fellow Representative Alexandria Ocasio-Cortez and attacking President Biden.
- December 14, 2021: House voted 222–208 on H.Res. 851 to hold former White House Chief of Staff Mark Meadows in criminal contempt of Congress for his refusal to comply with the House Select Committee investigation on the January 6 attack.
- February 4, 2022: The Republican National Committee censures Representatives Liz Cheney of Wyoming's at-large district and Adam Kinzinger of Illinois's 16th congressional district for their positions as members on the United States House Select Committee on the January 6 Attack.
- February 24, 2022: President Biden announces severe sanctions on Russia following its invasion of Ukraine.
- March 1, 2022: President Biden delivers the 2022 State of the Union Address.
- March 21–24, 2022: Hearings are held on the nomination of Ketanji Brown Jackson to the Supreme Court.
- March 24, 2022: Nebraska Representative Jeff Fortenberry is convicted by a jury in the Central District of California of one count of scheming to falsify material facts and two counts of lying to federal investigators relating to an illegal donation made to his campaign in 2016 by Lebanese-Nigerian billionaire Gilbert Chagoury. He resigns from Congress.
- March 29, 2022: Don Young, representative for Alaska's at-large congressional district since 1973 and dean of the House of Representatives, lies in state in the U.S. Capitol, having died on March 18.
- April 6, 2022: House voted 220–203 on H.Res. 1037 to hold former President Donald Trump officials Peter Navarro and Dan Scavino Jr. in criminal contempt of Congress for their refusal to comply with the House Select Committee investigation on the January 6 attack.
- April 7, 2022: The Senate confirmed Ketanji Brown Jackson to the United States Supreme Court.
- May 24, 2022: The Uvalde school shooting leaves 21 dead, and leaves Uvalde law enforcement officers criticized for their response.
- June 9, 2022: The House Special Select Committee investigating the January 6th Insurrection held the first of several summer hearings centered around the attack.
- June 24, 2022: The United States Supreme Court overturns Roe v. Wade.
- July 27, 2022: The Senate passed the CHIPS and Science Act.
- July 27, 2022: Senator Joe Manchin strikes a deal with Senate Majority Leader Chuck Schumer to resurrect some of President Joe Biden's climate, tax and healthcare agenda in the Inflation Reduction Act of 2022.
- July 28, 2022: The House passed the CHIPS and Science Act.
- July 31, 2022: U.S. drone strikes killed al-Qaeda leader Ayman al-Zawahiri.
- August 4, 2022: The Senate voted 95–1 in favor of ratifying the accession of Sweden and Finland into NATO.
- August 7, 2022: The Senate voted 51–50 to pass the Inflation Reduction Act, with Vice President Kamala Harris breaking the tie.
- August 8, 2022: The FBI executes a search warrant at former President Donald Trump's Mar-a-Lago residence.
- August 12, 2022: The House voted 220–207 to pass the Inflation Reduction Act.
- August 16, 2022: President Joe Biden signed the Inflation Reduction Act into law.
- August 24, 2022: President Biden canceled up to $20,000 in student loan debt.
- September 13, 2022: With the swearing-in of Mary Peltola, for the first time Congress has indigenous representatives from Native Alaskan, Native American, and Native Hawaiian peoples.
- September 21, 2022: The Senate voted 69–27 to pass the Kigali Amendment.
- October 6, 2022: President Biden pardons all prior offenses of marijuana possession, and instructs Attorney General Merrick Garland and Secretary Xavier Becerra to reconsider how marijuana is scheduled under federal law.
- November 17, 2022: House Speaker Nancy Pelosi announces she will step down as House Democratic Leader, that began in January 2023.
- November 30, 2022: House Democrats elect Hakeem Jeffries as the new House Democratic Leader, that began with the next Congress.
- December 9, 2022: Democratic senator Kyrsten Sinema officially leaves the Democratic Party and becomes an independent.
- December 9, 2022: Democratic representative Karen Bass resigns after winning the 2022 Los Angeles mayoral election.
- December 13, 2022: President Biden signs the Respect for Marriage Act into law, repealing the 1996 Defense of Marriage Act.
- December 21, 2022: Ukrainian President Volodymyr Zelenskyy addressed a joint session of Congress.
- December 29, 2022: President Biden signs the Consolidated Appropriations Act, 2023 into law, including several pieces of subsidiary legislation.

== Major legislation ==
=== Enacted ===
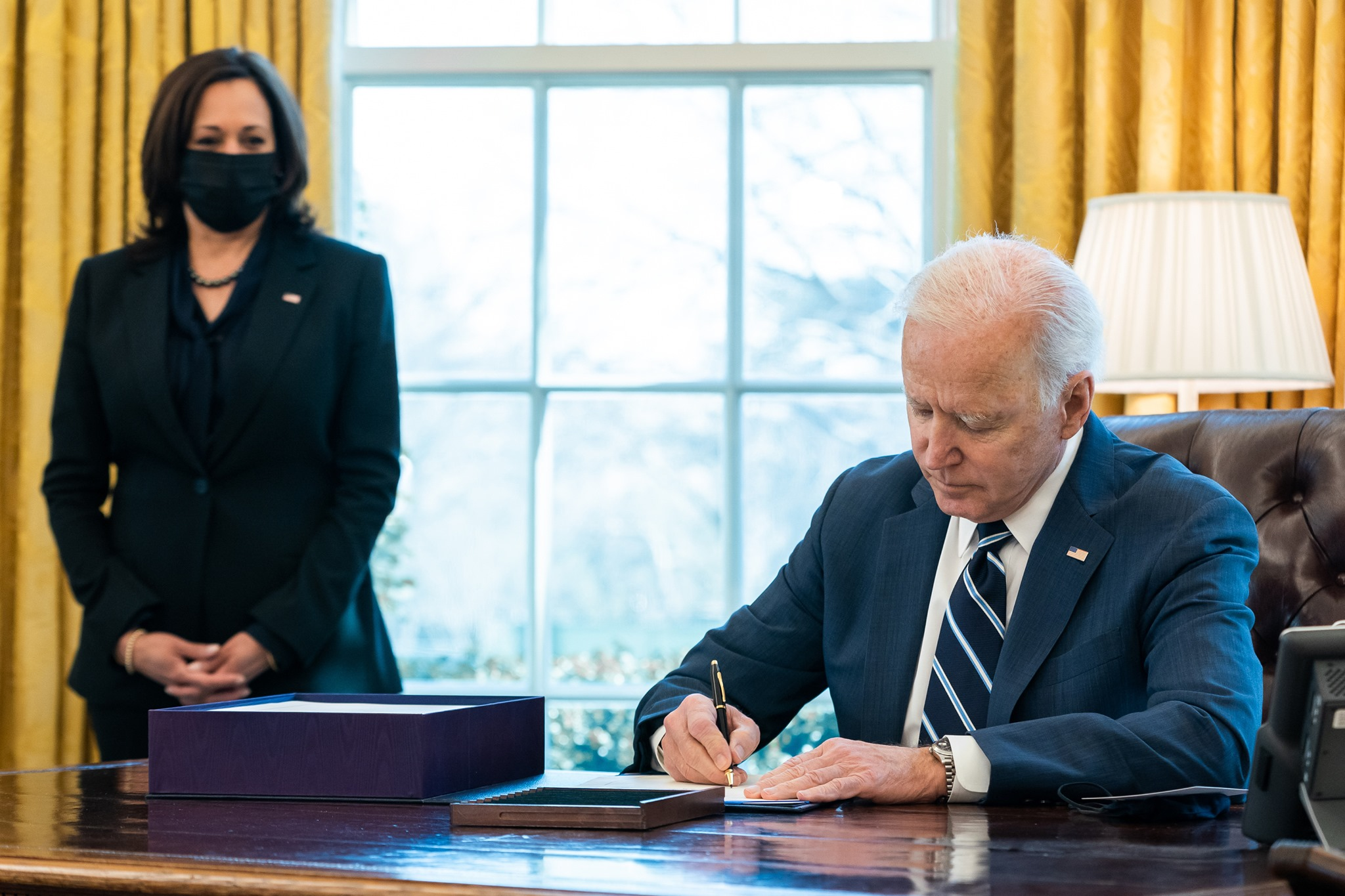
President Biden signs the American Rescue Plan Act of 2021 into law, March 11, 2021

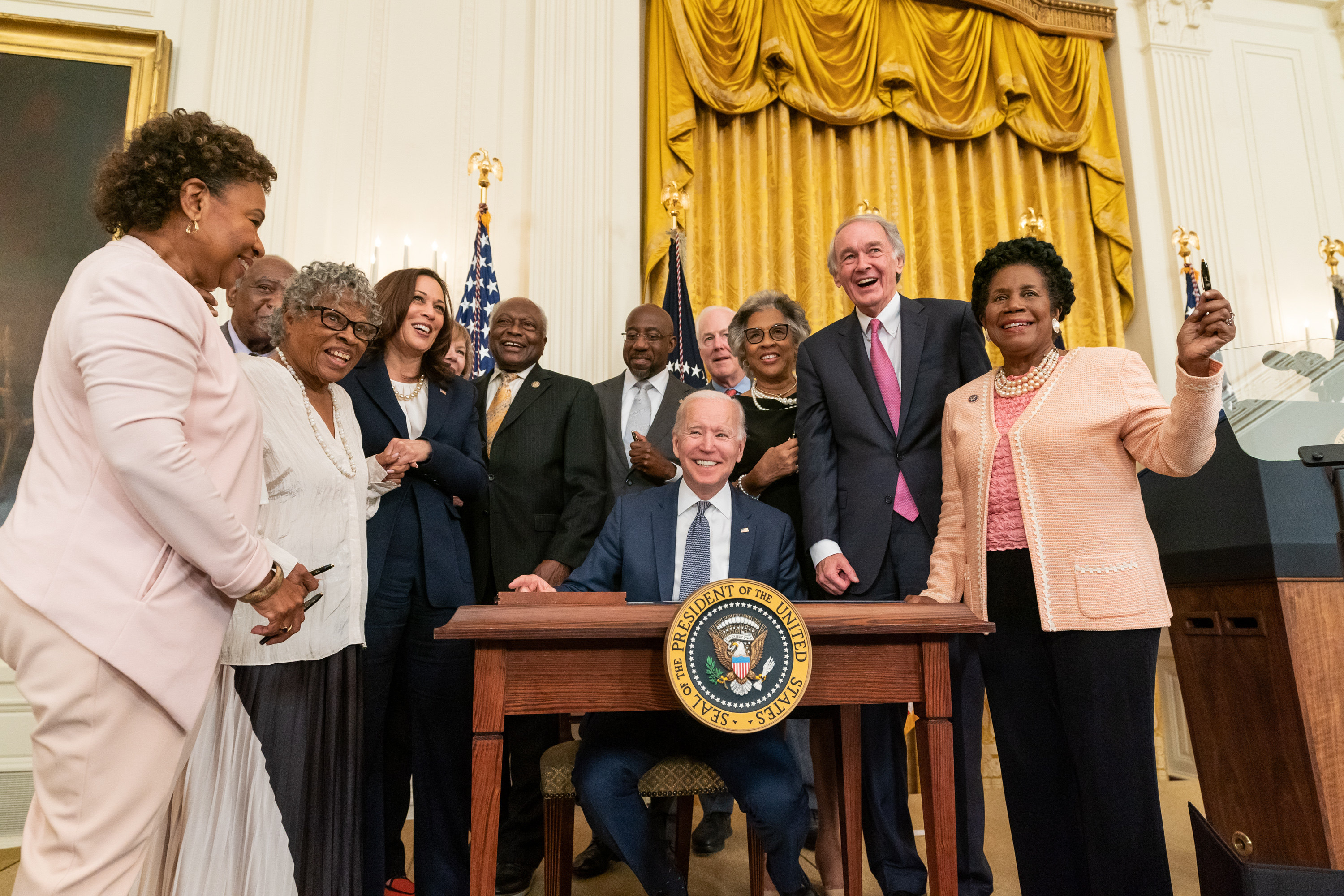
President Biden signs the Juneteenth National Independence Day Act into law, June 17, 2021

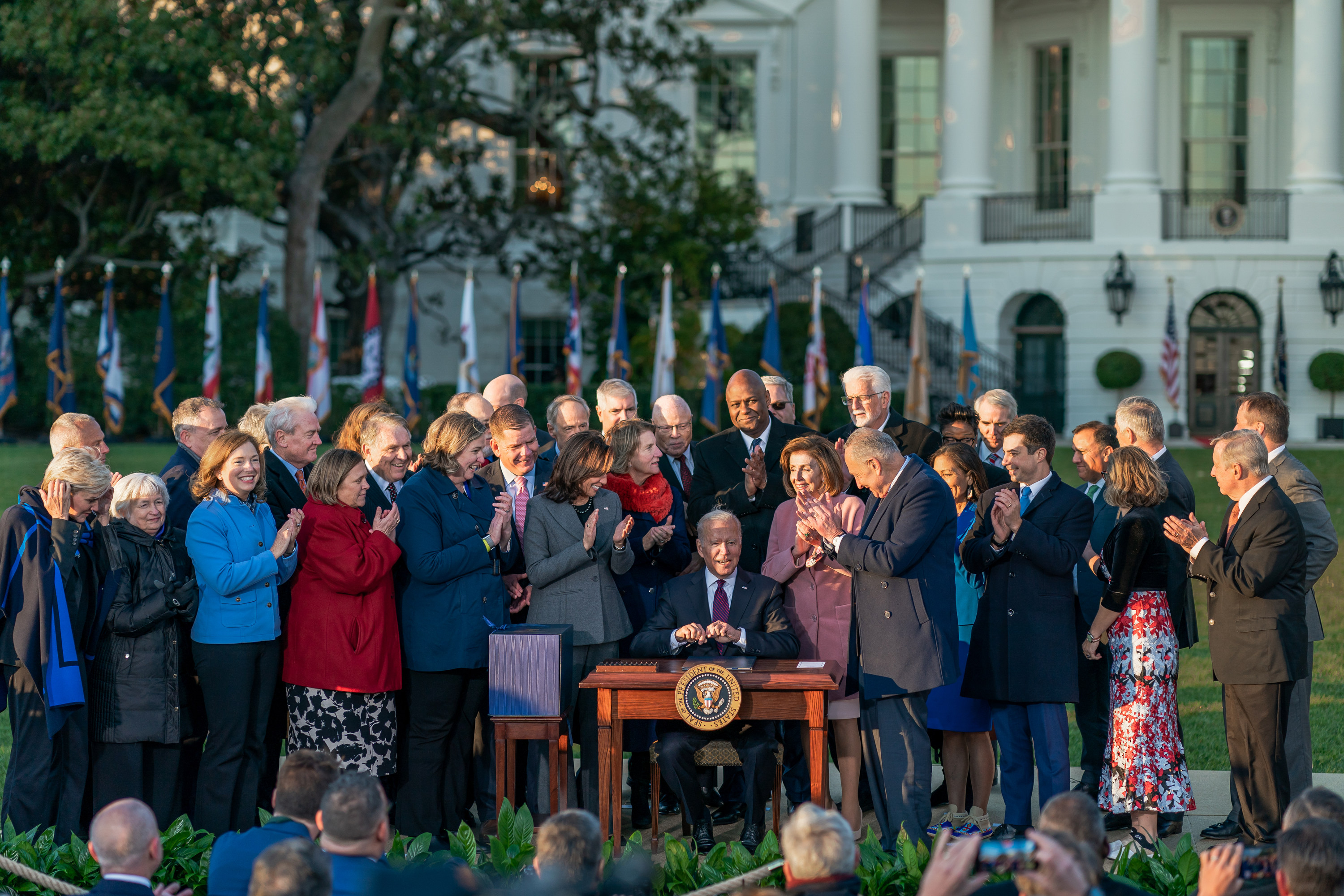
President Biden signs the Infrastructure Investment and Jobs Act into law, November 15, 2021

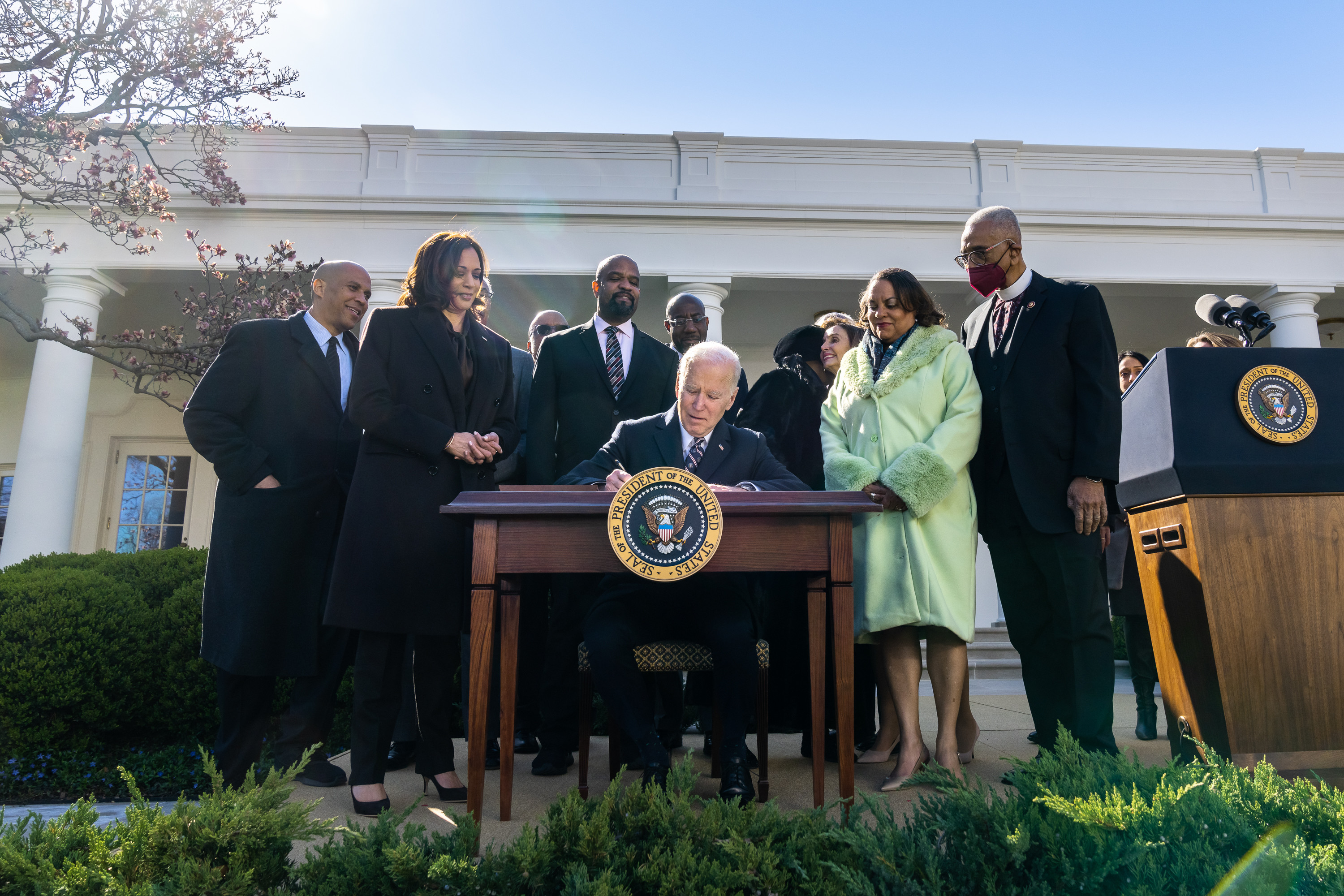
President Biden signs the Emmett Till Antilynching Act into law, March 29, 2022

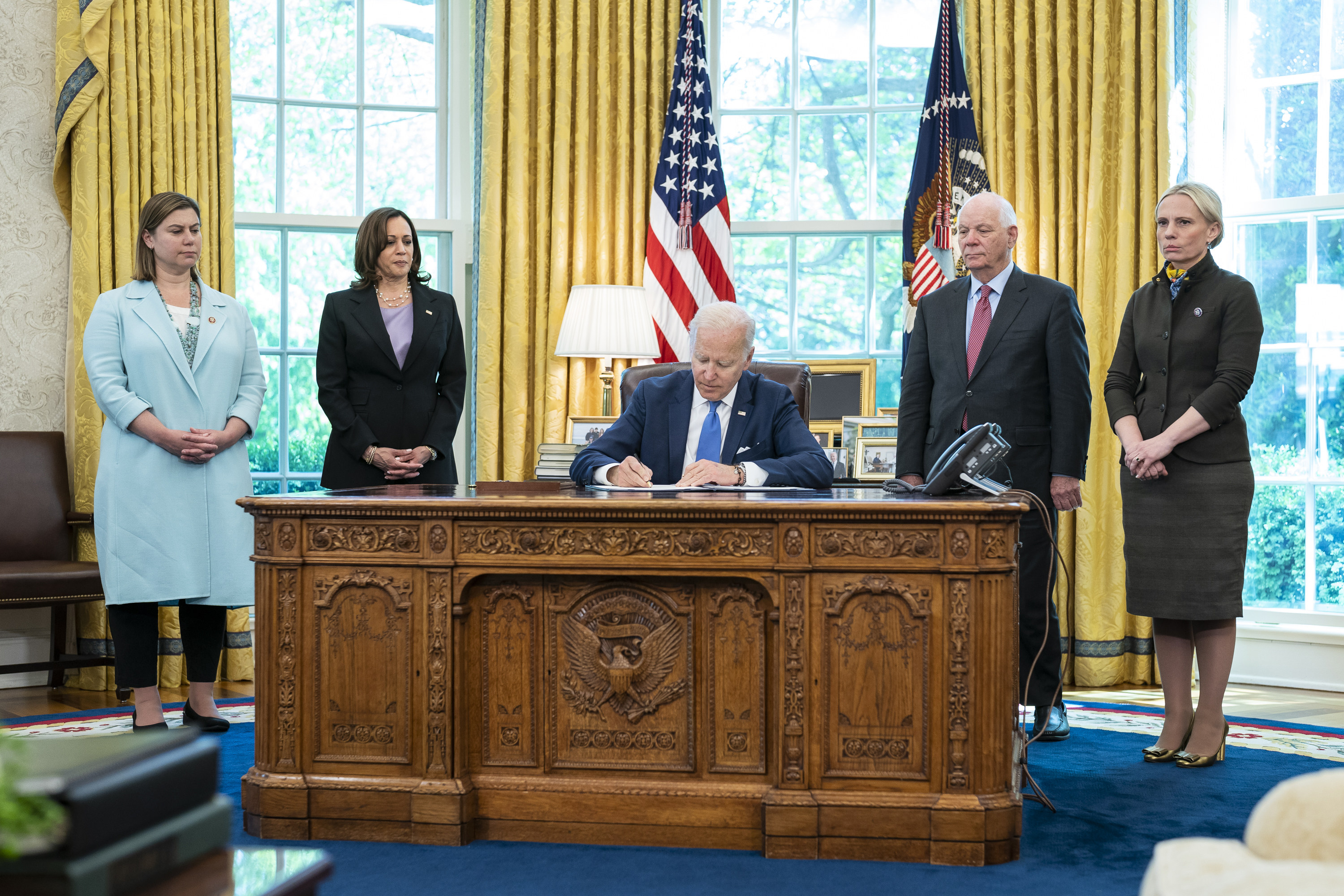
President Biden signs the Ukraine Democracy Defense Lend-Lease Act of 2022 into law, May 9, 2022

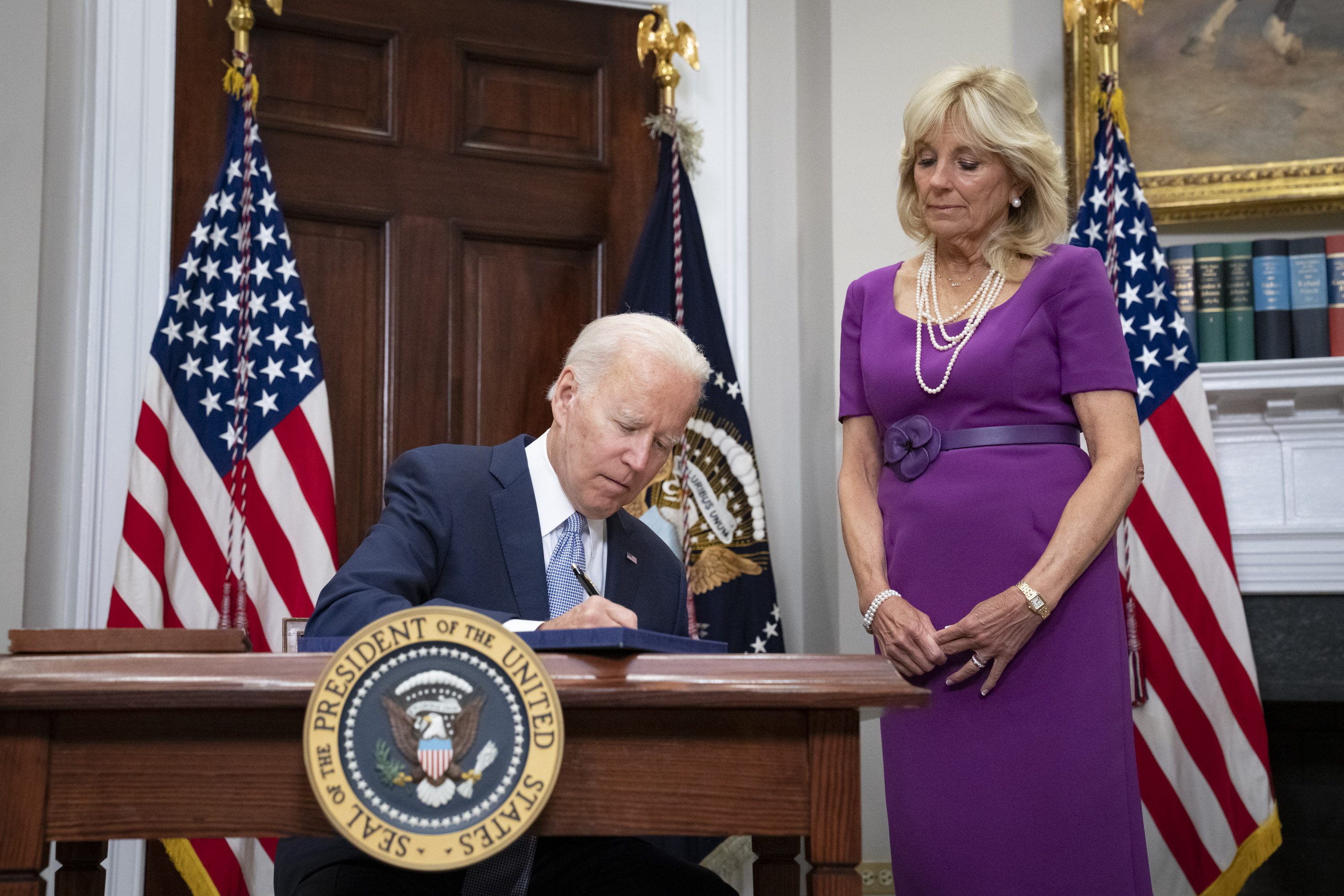
President Biden signs the Bipartisan Safer Communities Act into law, June 25, 2022

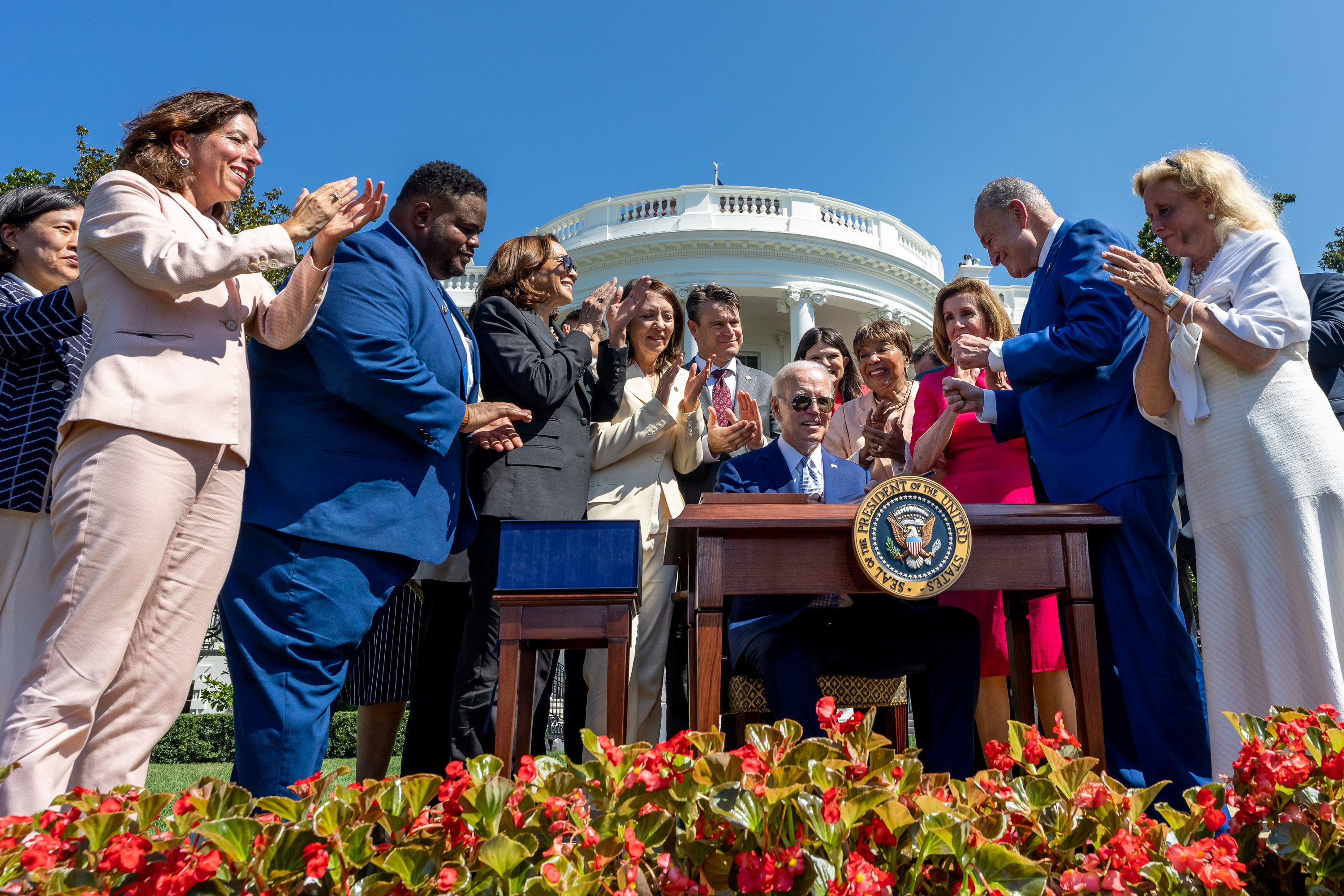
President Biden signs the CHIPS and Science Act into law, August 9, 2022

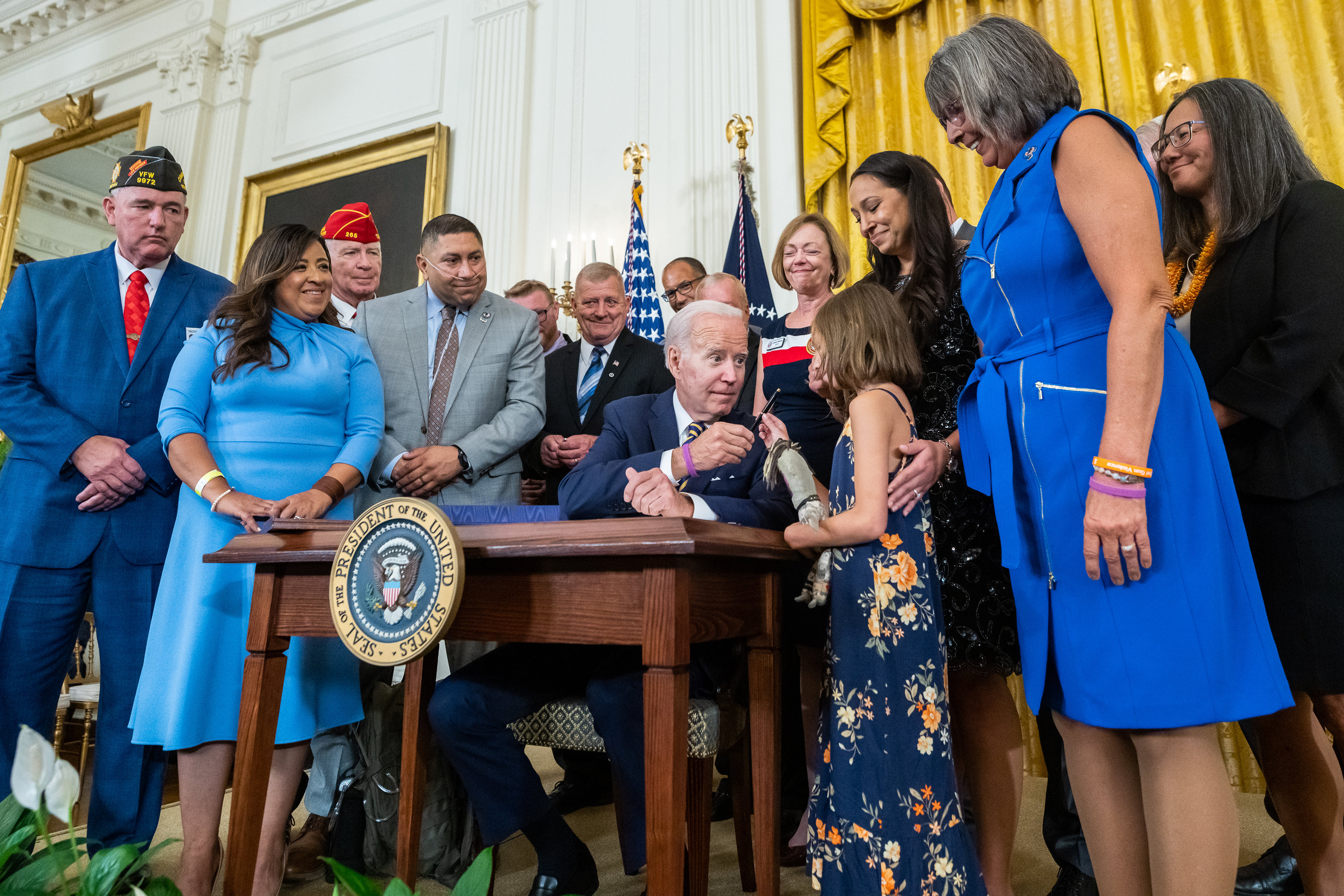
President Biden signs the Honoring Our PACT Act into law, August 10, 2022

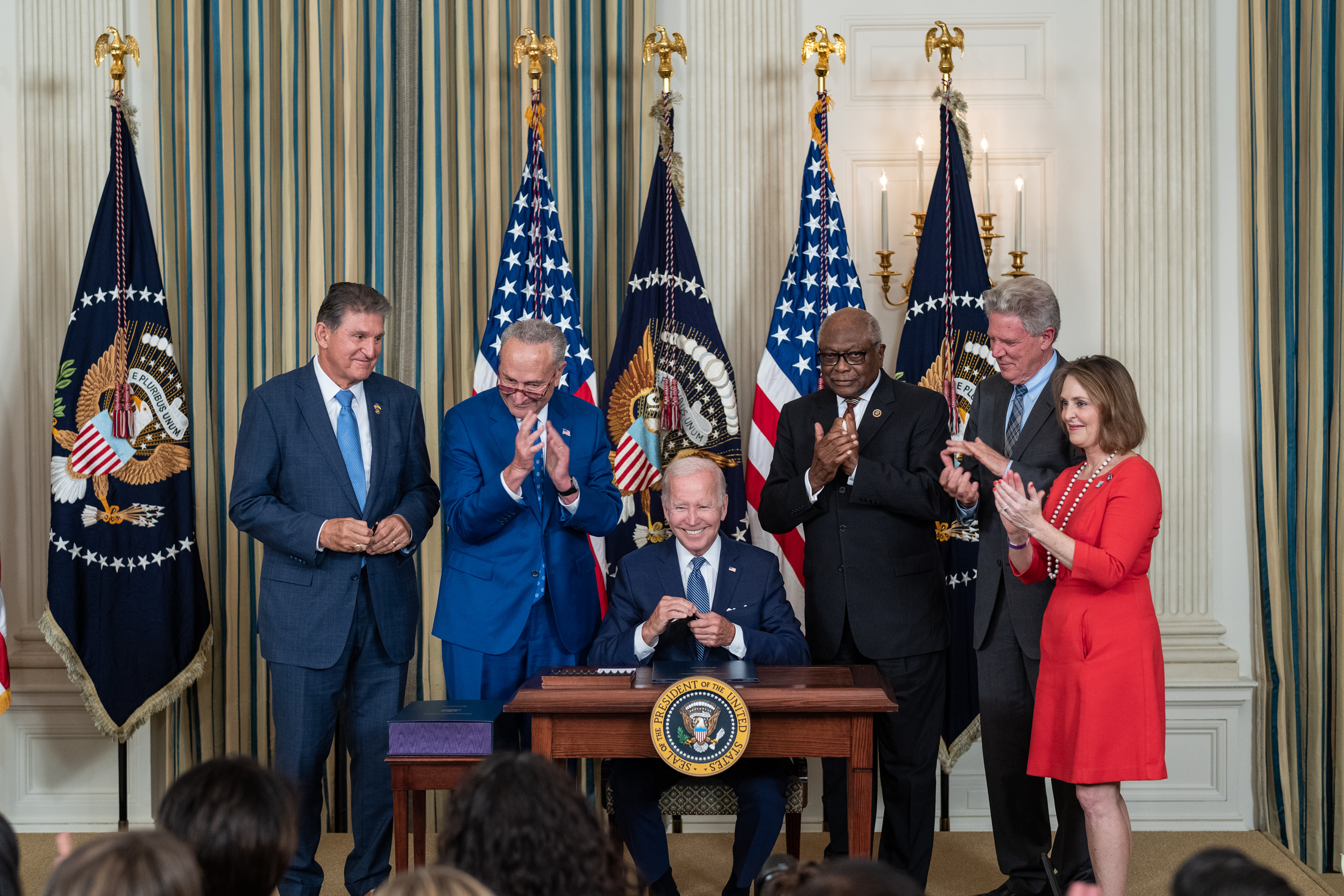
President Biden signs the Inflation Reduction Act into law, August 16, 2022

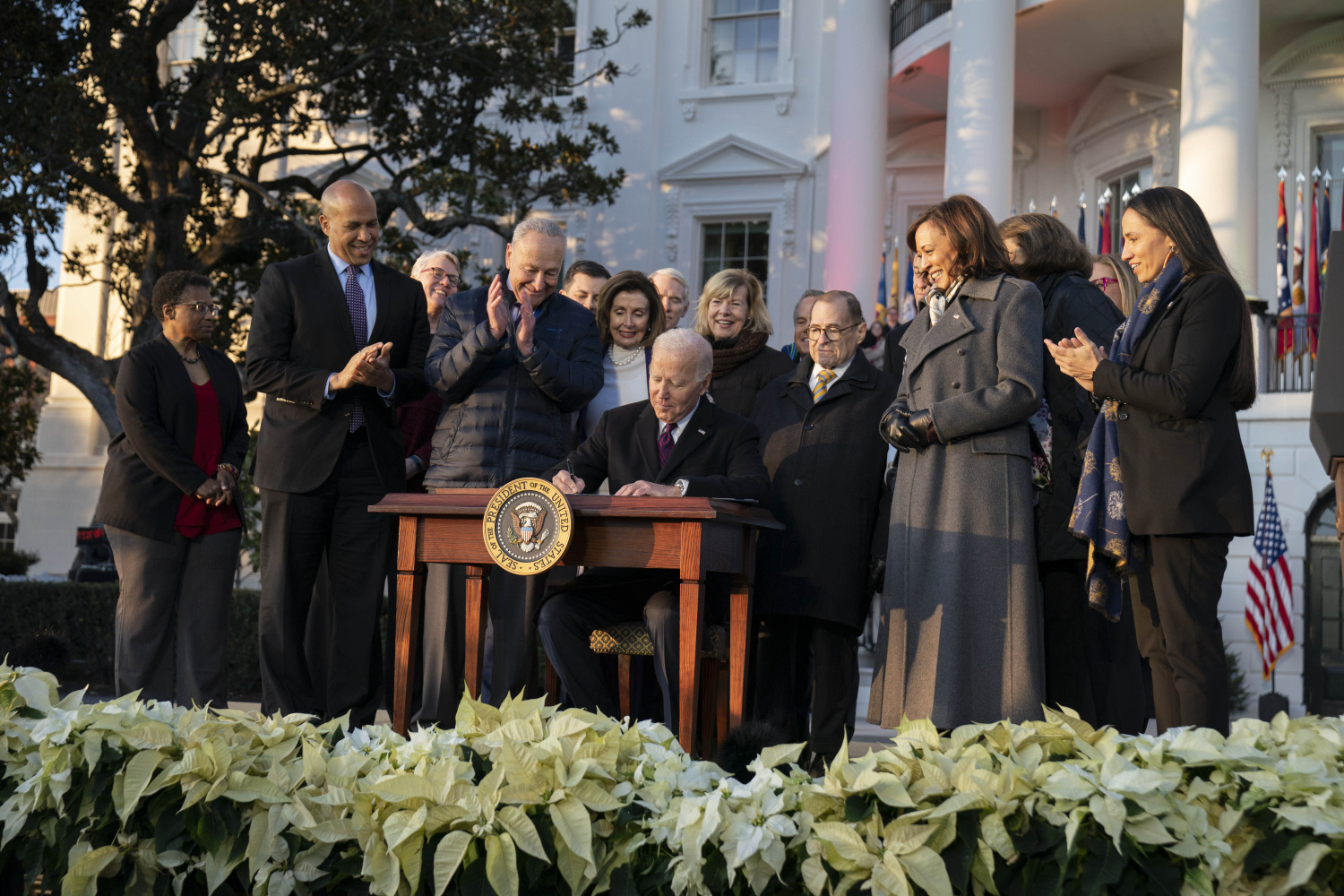
President Biden signs the Respect for Marriage Act into law, December 13, 2022

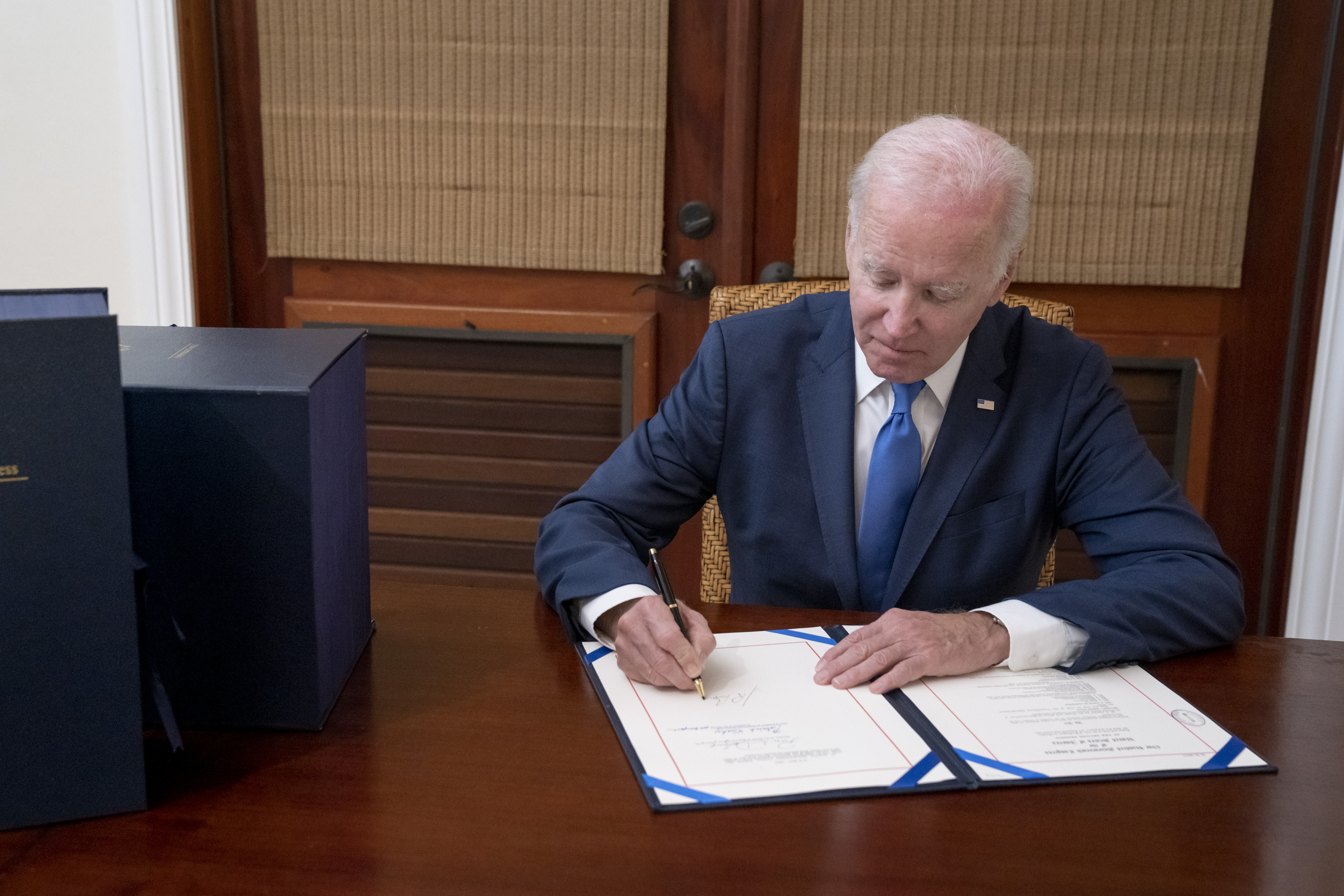
President Biden signs the Consolidated Appropriations Act of 2023 into law, December 29, 2022

- March 11, 2021: American Rescue Plan Act of 2021, Pub. L. 117–2 (text) (PDF), H.R. 1319
- March 11, 2021: PPP Extension Act of 2021, H.R. 1799
- May 20, 2021: COVID-19 Hate Crimes Act, S. 937
- June 17, 2021: Juneteenth National Independence Day Act, Pub. L. 117–17 (text) (PDF), S. 475
- October 27, 2021: Reinforcing Nicaragua's Adherence to Conditions for Electoral Reform (RENACER) Act, S. 1064
- November 15, 2021: Infrastructure Investment and Jobs Act, H.R. 3684
- December 22, 2021: Capitol Police Emergency Assistance Act, S. 3377
- December 23, 2021: Uyghur Forced Labor Prevention Act, H.R. 6256
- December 27, 2021: National Defense Authorization Act for Fiscal Year 2022, S. 1605
- March 15, 2022: Consolidated Appropriations Act, 2022 (including Violence Against Women Reauthorization Act), H.R. 2471
- March 29, 2022: Emmett Till Antilynching Act, H.R. 55
- April 6, 2022: Postal Service Reform Act of 2022, H.R. 3076
- May 9, 2022: Ukraine Democracy Defense Lend-Lease Act of 2022, S. 3522
- June 25, 2022: Bipartisan Safer Communities Act, S. 2938
- August 9, 2022: CHIPS and Science Act, H.R. 4346
- August 10, 2022: Honoring Our PACT Act of 2022, S. 3373
- August 16, 2022: Inflation Reduction Act, H.R. 5376
- December 2, 2022: Medical Marijuana and Cannabidiol Research Expansion Act, H.R. 8454
- December 7, 2022: Speak Out Act, S. 4524
- December 13, 2022: Respect for Marriage Act, H.R. 8404
- December 23, 2022: National Defense Authorization Act for Fiscal Year 2023, H.R. 7776
- December 29, 2022: Consolidated Appropriations Act, 2023 (including the Electoral Count Reform and Presidential Transition Improvement Act of 2022, Pregnant Workers Fairness Act, State Antitrust Enforcement Venue Act, Merger Filing Fee Modernization Act, and No TikTok on Government Devices Act), H.R. 2617
- January 5, 2023: National Heritage Area Act, S. 1942
- January 5, 2023: Sami's Law H.R. 1082

=== Proposed (but not enacted) ===
House bills

- H.R. 1: For the People Act of 2021 (passed the House, but the Senate took no action)
- H.R. 4: John R. Lewis Voting Rights Advancement Act of 2021 (passed the House, but the Senate took no action)
- H.R. 5: Equality Act of 2021 (passed the House, but the Senate took no action)
- H.R. 6: American Dream and Promise Act of 2021 (passed the House, but the Senate took no action)
- H.R. 7: Paycheck Fairness Act of 2021 (Senate failed to invoke cloture on the bill by a vote taken on June 8, 2021)
- H.R. 8: Bipartisan Background Checks Act of 2021 (passed the House; replaced with Bipartisan Safer Communities Act which was enacted)
- H.R. 40: Commission to Study and Develop Reparation Proposals for African-Americans Act
- H.R. 51: Washington, D.C. Admission Act of 2021 (passed the House, but the Senate took no action)
- H.R. 82: Social Security Fairness Act of 2021
- H.R. 97: Federal Death Penalty Abolition Act of 2021
- H.R. 127: Sabika Sheikh Firearm Licensing and Registration Act of 2021
- H.R. 256: Repeal of the Authorization for Use of Military Force Against Iraq Resolution of 2002 (passed the House, but the Senate took no action)
- H.R. 603: Raise the Wage Act of 2021
- H.R. 804: FAMILY Act of 2021
- H.R. 842: Protecting the Right to Organize Act of 2021 (passed the House, but the Senate took no action)
- H.R. 963: FAIR Act of 2022
- H.R. 1177: U.S. Citizenship Act of 2021
- H.R. 1195: Workplace Violence Prevention for Health Care and Social Service Workers Act (passed the House, but the Senate took no action)
- H.R. 1280: George Floyd Justice in Policing Act of 2021
- H.R. 1333: NO BAN Act (passed the House, but the Senate took no action)
- H.R. 1446: Enhanced Background Checks Act of 2021 (passed the House; replaced with Bipartisan Safer Communities Act which was enacted)
- H.R. 1522: Puerto Rico Statehood Admission Act of 2021
- H.R. 1603: Farm Workforce Modernization Act of 2021 (passed the House, but the Senate took no action)
- H.R. 1693: Eliminating a Quantifiably Unjust Application of the Law (EQUAL) Act of 2021 (passed the House, but the Senate took no action)
- H.R. 1808: Assault Weapons Ban of 2022 (passed the House, but the Senate took no action)
- H.R. 1916: Ensuring Lasting Smiles Act (passed the House, but the Senate took no action)
- H.R. 1976: To establish an improved Medicare for All national health insurance program.
- H.R. 1996: SAFE Banking Act of 2021 (passed the House, but the Senate took no action)
- H.R. 2116: CROWN Act of 2022 (passed the House, but the Senate took no action)
- H.R. 2773: Recovering America's Wildlife Act (passed the House, but the Senate took no action)
- H.R. 3233: National Commission to Investigate the January 6 Attack on the United States Capitol Complex Act (Senate failed to invoke cloture on the bill by a vote taken on May 28, 2021)
- H.R. 3617: MORE Act of 2021 (passed the House, but the Senate took no action)
- H.R. 3849: ACCESS Act
- H.R. 3940: Local Journalism Sustainability Act
- H.R. 3985: Averting Loss of Life and Injury by Expediting SIVs (ALLIES) Act of 2021 (passed the House, but the Senate took no action)
- H.R. 4521: America COMPETES Act of 2022 (incorporated into the CHIPS and Science Act)
- H.R. 8393: Puerto Rico Status Act (passed the House, but the Senate took no action)
- H.R. 8873: Presidential Election Reform Act (passed the House, but the Senate took no action)

Senate bills

- S. 27: See Something, Say Something Online Act of 2021
- S. 53: Raise the Wage Act of 2021
- S. 623: Sunshine Protection Act of 2021 (passed the Senate, but the House took no action)
- S. 754: Ensuring Lasting Smiles Act
- S. 1302: Social Security Fairness Act of 2021
- S. 1260: U.S. Innovation and Competition Act (passed the House; incorporated into the CHIPS and Science Act)
- S. 1601: Future of Local News Act
- S. 2710: Open App Markets Act
- S. 2747: Freedom to Vote Act (Senate failed to invoke cloture on a motion to proceed to the bill by vote held on January 19, 2022)
- S. 2992: American Innovation and Choice Online Act
- S. 3538: EARN IT Act
- S. 4132: Women's Health Protection Act (Senate failed to invoke cloture on a motion to proceed to the bill by vote held on May 11, 2022)
- S. 4822: DISCLOSE Act (Senate failed to invoke cloture on a motion to proceed to the bill by vote held on August 22, 2022)

== Major resolutions ==
=== Adopted ===
- H.Res. 21: Calling on Vice President Michael R. Pence to convene and mobilize the principal officers of the executive departments of the Cabinet to activate section 4 of the 25th Amendment to declare President Donald J. Trump incapable of executing the duties of his office and to immediately exercise powers as acting president.
- H.Res. 24 (Second impeachment of Donald Trump): Impeaching Donald John Trump, President of the United States, for high crimes and misdemeanors.
- S.Res. 5: A resolution honoring the memory of Officer Brian David Sicknick of the United States Capitol Police for his selfless acts of heroism on the grounds of the United States Capitol on January 6, 2021.
- H.Res. 72 (Removal of Representative Marjorie Taylor Greene from committee assignments): Removing a certain Member from certain standing committees of the House of Representatives
- H.Res. 134: Condemning the 2021 Myanmar coup d'état.
- H.Res. 730: Recommending that the House of Representatives find Stephen K. Bannon in contempt of Congress for refusal to comply with a subpoena duly issued by the Select Committee to Investigate the January 6th Attack on the United States Capitol..
- H.Res. 789: Censuring Representative Paul Gosar.
- H.J.Res. 100: To provide for a resolution with respect to the unresolved disputes between certain railroads represented by the National Carriers' Conference Committee of the National Railway Labor Conference and certain of their employees.

=== Proposed ===
- H.Res. 14: Censuring and condemning President Donald J. Trump for attempting to overturn the results of the November 2020 presidential election in the State of Georgia.
- H.J.Res. 17: Removing the deadline for the ratification of the equal rights amendment.
- H.Res. 25: Directing the Committee on Ethics to investigate, and issue a report on, whether any and all actions taken by Members of the 117th Congress who sought to overturn the 2020 Presidential election violated their oath of office to uphold the Constitution or the Rules of the House of Representatives, and should face sanction, including expulsion from the House of Representatives.
- H.Res. 332: Recognizing the duty of the Federal Government to create a Green New Deal.

== Party summary ==
Resignations and new members are discussed in the "Changes in membership" section below.

=== Senate ===
Senate membership

Final (from January 20, 2021)

Begin (January 3, 2021 – January 18, 2021)

January 18, 2021 – January 20, 2021

	Party (shading shows control)			Total	Vacant
	Democratic	Independent (caucusing with Democrats)	Republican	Total	Vacant
End of previous Congress	46	2	52	100	0
Begin (January 3, 2021) (Note: The Congress began with 51 Republicans, 48 Democrats (including 2 independents who caucus with the Democrats) and 1 vacancy in the Senate. Georgia's class 2 seat was vacant from the start until Democrat Jon Ossoff was seated January 20, 2021. Georgia's class 3 Republican interim appointee Kelly Loeffler served until Democrat Raphael Warnock was seated also on January 20.)	46	2	51	99	1
January 18, 2021 (Note: In California: Kamala Harris (D) resigned January 18, 2021, to become U.S. Vice President. Alex Padilla (D) was appointed to complete the unexpired term and began serving January 20.)	45	2	51	98	2
January 20, 2021 (Note: In Georgia: Kelly Loeffler (R) lost a special election to finish the term. Jon Ossoff (D) and Raphael Warnock (D) began their service January 20, 2021.) (Note: Kamala Harris (D) became U.S. Vice President January 20, 2021, with the tie-breaking vote. The Senate elected Patrick Leahy to serve as President pro tempore also began on January 20.)	48 (Note: In Arizona: Kyrsten Sinema declared that she left the Democratic Party to become an independent politician on December 9, 2022. She was still recognized as a Democrat by the Senate throughout the Congress, and did not formally switch her affiliation until the beginning of the 118th Congress.)	2	50	100	0
Final voting share	50.0%		50.0%		
Beginning of the next Congress	48	3	49	100	0

=== House of Representatives ===
House membership

Final (from December 31, 2022)

Begin (January 3, 2021 – January 15, 2021)

January 15, 2021 – February 7, 2021

February 7, 2021 – February 11, 2021

February 11, 2021 – March 10, 2021

March 10, 2021 – March 16, 2021

March 16, 2021 – April 6, 2021

April 6, 2021 – April 14, 2021

April 14, 2021 – May 11, 2021

May 11, 2021 – May 16, 2021

May 16, 2021 – June 14, 2021

June 14, 2021 – July 30, 2021

July 30, 2021 – November 4, 2021

November 4, 2021 – January 1, 2022

January 1, 2022 – January 18, 2022

January 18, 2022 – February 17, 2022

February 17, 2022 – March 18, 2022

March 18, 2022 – March 31, 2022

March 31, 2022 – May 10, 2022

May 10, 2022 – May 25, 2022

May 25, 2022 – June 14, 2022

June 14, 2022 – June 21, 2022

June 21, 2022 – July 12, 2022

July 12, 2022 – August 3, 2022

August 3, 2022 – August 12, 2022

August 12, 2022 – August 31, 2022

August 31, 2022 – September 13, 2022

September 13, 2022 – September 30, 2022

September 30, 2022 – November 14, 2022

November 14, 2022 – November 28, 2022

November 28, 2022 – December 9, 2022

December 9, 2022 – December 30, 2022

December 30, 2022 – December 31, 2022

	Party (shading shows control)				Total	Vacant
	Democratic	Independent	Republican	Libertarian	Total	Vacant
End of previous Congress	233	1	195	1	430	5
Begin (January 3, 2021) (Note: In Louisiana's 5th district: member-elect Luke Letlow (R) died December 29, 2020, before the term started, and Julia Letlow (R) was elected March 20, 2021. She was sworn in on April 14.) (Note: In New York's 22nd district: the term began with the previous election disputed; Claudia Tenney was declared the winner and was sworn in February 11, 2021.)	222	0	211	0	433	2
January 15, 2021 (Note: In Louisiana's 2nd district: Cedric Richmond (D) resigned January 15, 2021, and Troy Carter (D) was elected April 14, 2021. He was sworn in on May 11.)	221	0	211	0	432	3
February 7, 2021 (Note: In Texas's 6th district: Ron Wright (R) died February 7, 2021, and Jake Ellzey (R) was elected July 27, 2021. He was sworn in on July 30.)	221	0	210	0	431	4
February 11, 2021	221	0	211	0	432	3
March 10, 2021 (Note: In Ohio's 11th district: Marcia Fudge (D) resigned March 10, 2021, and Shontel Brown (D) was elected November 2, 2021. She was sworn in on November 4.)	220	0	211	0	431	4
March 16, 2021 (Note: In New Mexico's 1st district: Deb Haaland (D) resigned March 16, 2021, and Melanie Stansbury (D) was elected June 1, 2021. She was sworn in on June 14.)	219	0	211	0	430	5
April 6, 2021 (Note: In Florida's 20th district: Alcee Hastings (D) died April 6, 2021, and Sheila Cherfilus-McCormick (D) was elected January 11, 2022. She was sworn in on January 18.)	218	0	211	0	429	6
April 14, 2021	218	0	212	0	430	5
May 11, 2021	219	0	212	0	431	4
May 16, 2021 (Note: In Ohio's 15th district: Steve Stivers (R) resigned May 16, 2021, and Mike Carey (R) was elected November 2, 2021. He was sworn in on November 4.)	219	0	211	0	430	5
June 14, 2021	220	0	211	0	431	4
July 30, 2021	220	0	212	0	432	3
November 4, 2021	221	0	213	0	434	1
January 1, 2022 (Note: In California's 22nd district: Devin Nunes (R) resigned January 1, 2022, and Connie Conway (R) was elected on June 7, 2022. She was sworn in on June 14.)	221	0	212	0	433	2
January 18, 2022	222	0	212	0	434	1
February 17, 2022 (Note: In Minnesota's 1st district: Jim Hagedorn (R) died February 17, 2022, and Brad Finstad (R) was elected August 9, 2022. He was sworn in on August 12.)	222	0	211	0	433	2
March 18, 2022 (Note: In Alaska's at-large district: Don Young (R) died March 18, 2022, and Mary Peltola (D) was elected August 16, 2022. She was sworn in on September 13.)	222	0	210	0	432	3
March 31, 2022 (Note: In Nebraska's 1st district: Jeff Fortenberry (R) resigned March 31, 2022, and Mike Flood (R) was elected June 28, 2022. He was sworn in on July 12.) (Note: In Texas's 34th district: Filemon Vela Jr. (D) resigned March 31, 2022, and Mayra Flores (R) was elected June 14, 2022. She was sworn in on June 21.)	221	0	209	0	430	5
May 10, 2022 (Note: In New York's 23rd district: Tom Reed (R) resigned May 10, 2022, and Joe Sempolinski (R) was elected August 23, 2022. He was sworn in on September 13.)	221	0	208	0	429	6
May 25, 2022 (Note: In New York's 19th district: Antonio Delgado (D) resigned May 25, 2022, and Pat Ryan (D) was elected August 23, 2022. He was sworn in on September 13.)	220	0	208	0	428	7
June 14, 2022	220	0	209	0	429	6
June 21, 2022	220	0	210	0	430	5
July 12, 2022	220	0	211	0	431	4
August 3, 2022 (Note: In Indiana's 2nd district: Jackie Walorski (R) died August 3, 2022, and Rudy Yakym (R) was elected November 8, 2022. He was sworn in on November 14.)	220	0	210	0	430	5
August 12, 2022	220	0	211	0	431	4
August 31, 2022 (Note: In Florida's 13th district: Charlie Crist (D) resigned August 31, 2022.)	219	0	211	0	430	5
September 13, 2022	221	0	212	0	433	2
September 30, 2022 (Note: In Florida's 22nd district: Ted Deutch (D) resigned September 30, 2022.)	220	0	212	0	432	3
November 14, 2022	220	0	213	0	433	2
November 28, 2022 (Note: In Virginia's 4th district: Donald McEachin (D) died November 28, 2022.)	219	0	213	0	432	3
December 9, 2022 (Note: In California's 37th district: Karen Bass (D) resigned December 9, 2022.)	218	0	213	0	431	4
December 30, 2022 (Note: In North Carolina's 1st district: G. K. Butterfield (D) resigned December 30, 2022.) (Note: Congress had already adjourned by the time of this resignation)	217	0	213	0	430	5
December 31, 2022 (Note: In Pennsylvania's 18th district: Mike Doyle (D) resigned December 31, 2022.)	216	0	213	0	429	6
Final voting share	50.3%	0.0%	49.7%	0.0%		
Non-voting members	4	0	2 (Note: Includes a New Progressive Party member who is also affiliated as a Republican.)	0	6	0
Beginning of the next Congress	212	0	222	0	434	1

== Leadership ==
Note: Democrats refer to themselves as a "caucus"; Republicans refer to themselves as a "conference".

=== Senate leadership ===
Senate President

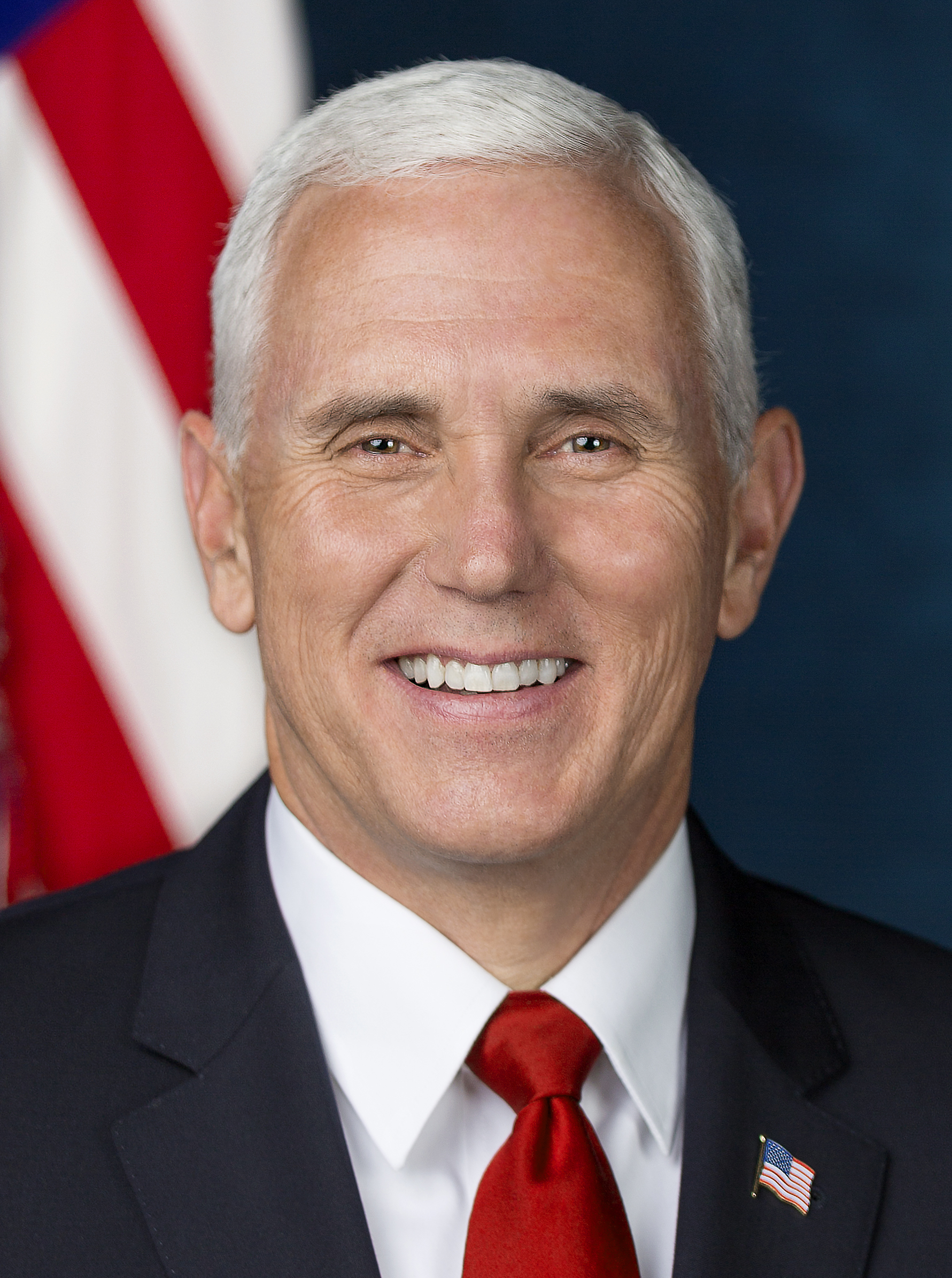
Mike Pence (R),
until January 20, 2021

Kamala Harris (D),
from January 20, 2021

Senate President pro tempore

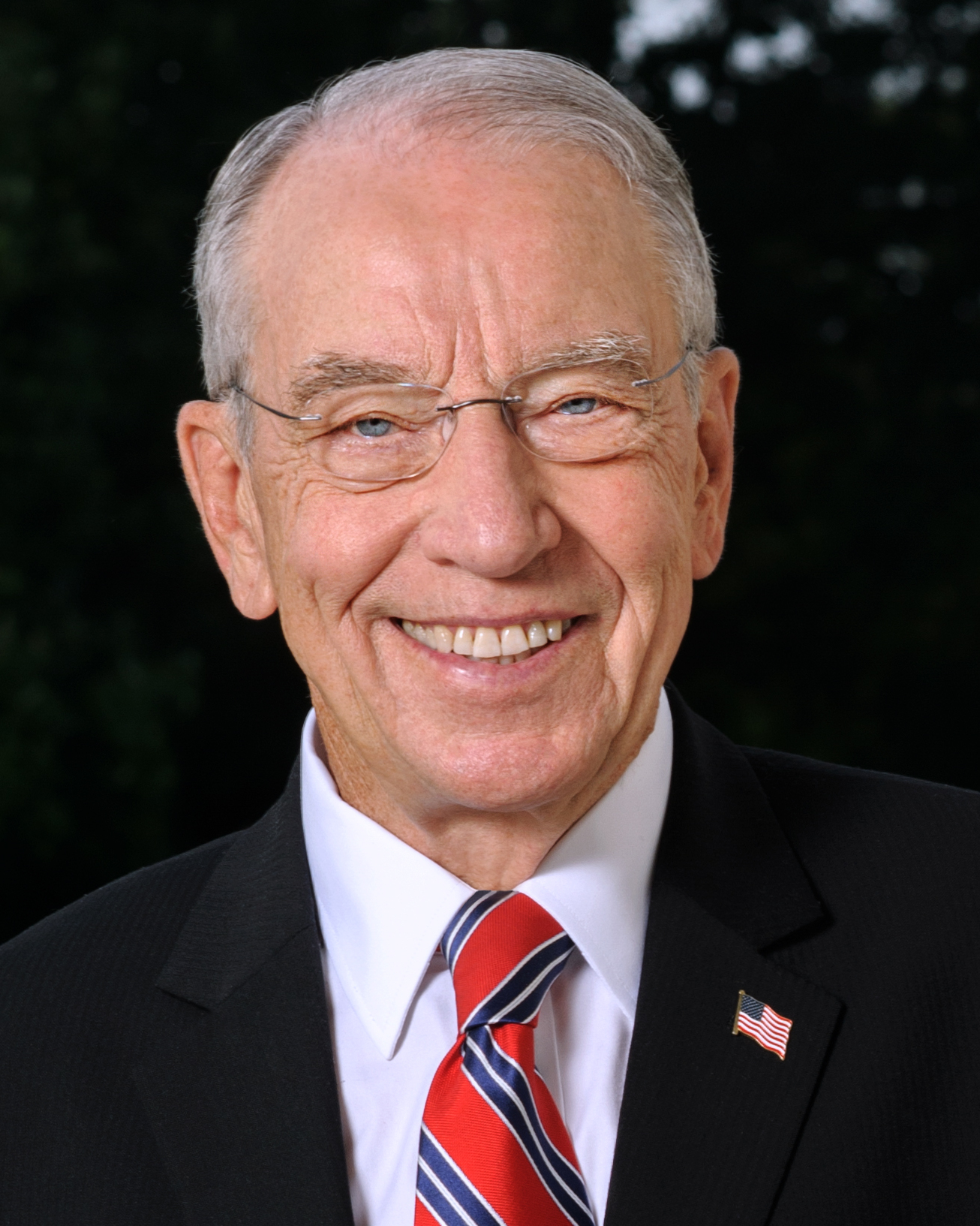
Chuck Grassley (R),
until January 20, 2021

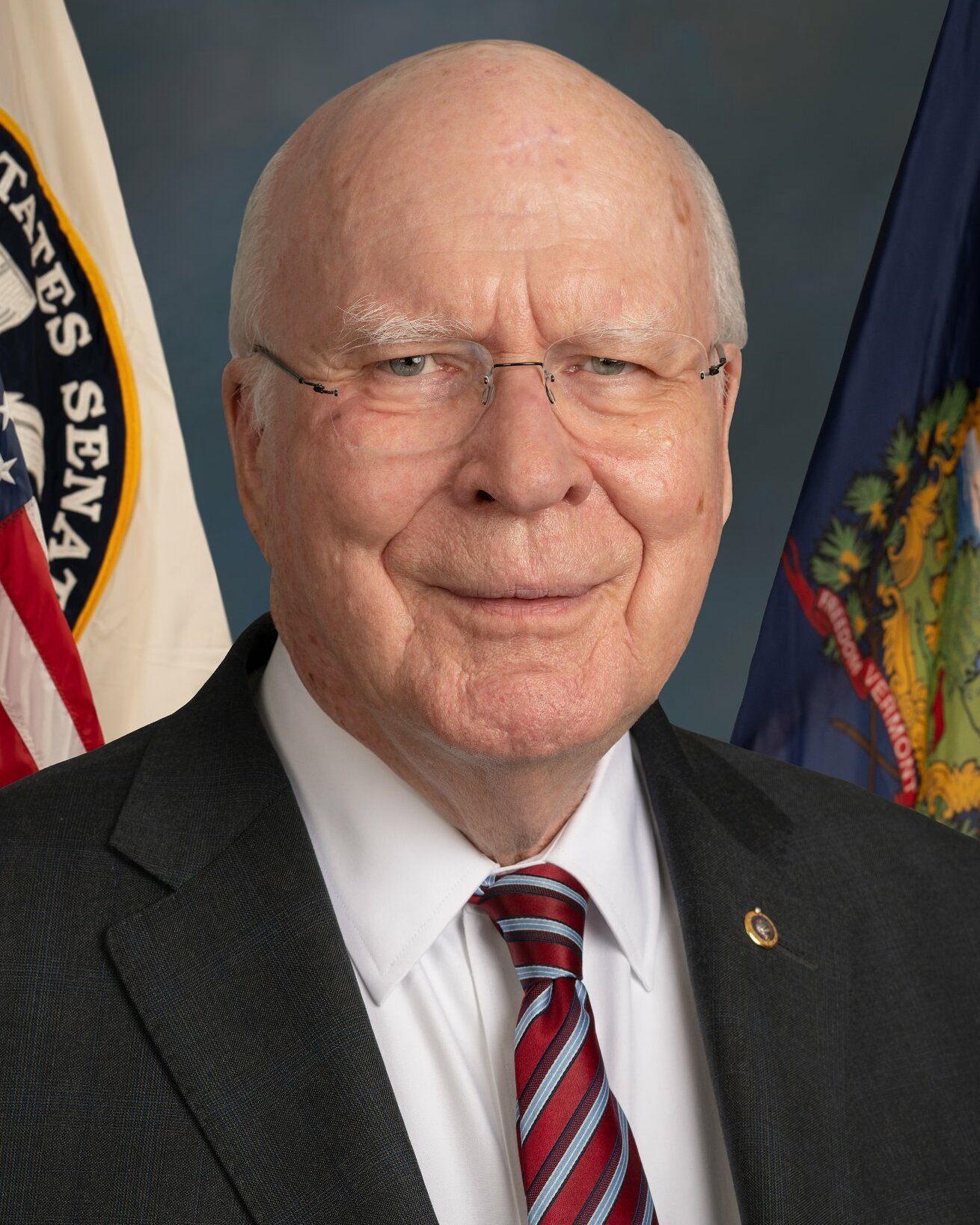
Patrick Leahy (D),
from January 20, 2021

==== Presiding ====
- President of the Senate: Mike Pence (R), until January 20, 2021
  - Kamala Harris (D), from January 20, 2021
- President pro tempore: Chuck Grassley (R), until January 20, 2021
  - Patrick Leahy (D), from January 20, 2021

==== Democratic leadership ====
(minority until January 20, 2021, majority thereafter)

- Senate Majority Leader since January 20, 2021: Chuck Schumer
- Senate Majority Whip since January 20, 2021: Dick Durbin
- Senate Assistant Democratic Leader: Patty Murray
- Chair of the Senate Democratic Policy and Communications Committee: Debbie Stabenow
- Vice Chairs of the Senate Democratic Caucus: Mark Warner and Elizabeth Warren
- Chair of the Senate Democratic Steering and Outreach Committee: Amy Klobuchar
- Chair of Senate Democratic Outreach: Bernie Sanders
- Vice Chairs of the Senate Democratic Policy and Communications Committee: Cory Booker and Joe Manchin
- Secretary of the Senate Democratic Caucus: Tammy Baldwin
- Chair of the Democratic Senatorial Campaign Committee: Gary Peters
- Vice Chair of Senate Democratic Outreach: Catherine Cortez Masto

==== Republican leadership ====
(majority until January 20, 2021, minority thereafter)

- Senate Minority Leader: Mitch McConnell
- Senate Minority Whip: John Thune
- Chair of the Senate Republican Conference: John Barrasso
- Chair of the Senate Republican Policy Committee: Roy Blunt
- Chair of the Senate Republican Steering Committee: Mike Lee
- Vice Chair of the Senate Republican Conference: Joni Ernst
- Chair of the National Republican Senatorial Committee: Rick Scott

=== House leadership ===
House Speaker

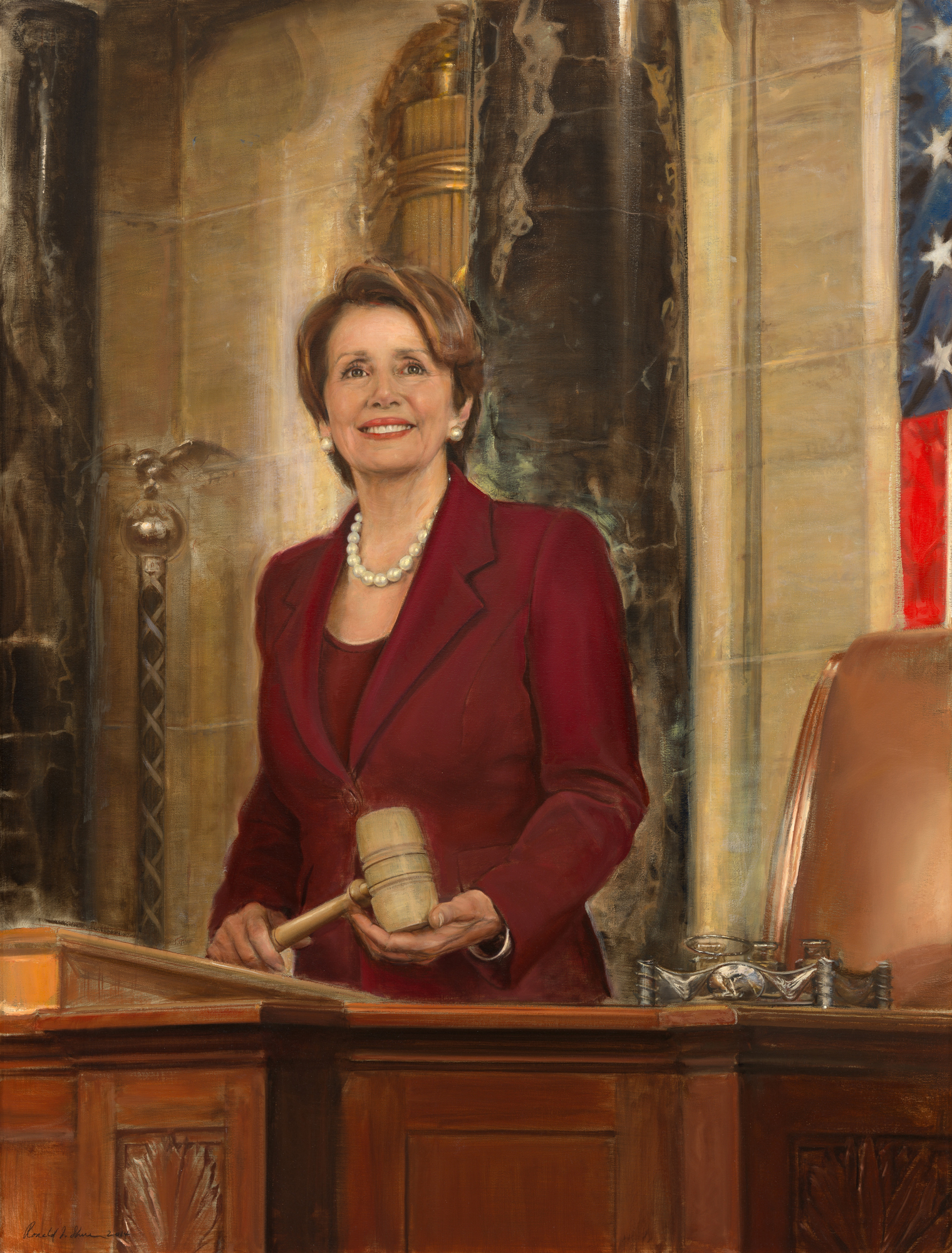
Nancy Pelosi (D)

==== Presiding ====
- Speaker: Nancy Pelosi (D)

==== Majority (Democratic) leadership ====
- House Majority Leader: Steny Hoyer
- House Majority Whip: Jim Clyburn
- Assistant Speaker of the House: Katherine Clark
- Chair of the House Democratic Caucus: Hakeem Jeffries
- Vice Chair of the House Democratic Caucus: Pete Aguilar
- Chair of the Democratic Congressional Campaign Committee: Sean Patrick Maloney
- Co-Chairs of the House Democratic Policy and Communications Committee: Matt Cartwright, Debbie Dingell, Ted Lieu, and Joe Neguse
- House Democratic Junior Caucus Leadership Representative: Colin Allred
- House Democratic Freshman Class Leadership Representative: Mondaire Jones
- Co-Chairs of the House Democratic Steering and Policy Committee: Cheri Bustos, Barbara Lee, and Eric Swalwell
- House Democratic Senior Chief Deputy Whips: G. K. Butterfield and Jan Schakowsky
- House Democratic Chief Deputy Whips: Henry Cuellar, Sheila Jackson Lee, Dan Kildee, Stephanie Murphy, Jimmy Panetta, Terri Sewell, Debbie Wasserman Schultz, and Peter Welch

==== Minority (Republican) leadership ====
- House Minority Leader and Chair of the House Republican Steering Committee: Kevin McCarthy
- House Minority Whip: Steve Scalise
- Chair of the House Republican Conference: Liz Cheney (until May 12, 2021)
  - Elise Stefanik (since May 14, 2021)
- Vice Chair of the House Republican Conference: Mike Johnson
- Secretary of the House Republican Conference: Rich Hudson
- Chair of the House Republican Policy Committee: Gary Palmer
- Chair of the National Republican Congressional Committee: Tom Emmer

== Demographics ==
There are 57 African American members of the US House (blue), 47 Hispanics and Latinos (red), 5 Native Americans (yellow), 18 Asian Americans (green), and 314 Whites/European American (gray). 117th Congress (2021–2023).

There are 3 African American members of the US Senate (blue), 7 Hispanics or Latinos (red), 0 Native Americans, 2 Asian Americans (green), and 88 European Americans (gray). 117th Congress (2021–2023).

== Members ==
=== Senators ===
The numbers refer to their Senate classes. All class 1 senators are in the middle of their term (2019–2025), having been elected in 2018 and facing re-election in 2024. Class 2 senators are at the beginning of their term (2021–2027), having been elected in 2020 and facing re-election in 2026. Class 3 senators are at the end of their term (2017–2023), having been elected in 2016 and facing re-election in 2022.

==== Alabama ====
▌2. Tommy Tuberville (R)
▌3. Richard Shelby (R)

==== Alaska ====
▌2. Dan Sullivan (R)
▌3. Lisa Murkowski (R)

==== Arizona ====
▌1. Kyrsten Sinema (D)
▌3. Mark Kelly (D)

==== Arkansas ====
▌2. Tom Cotton (R)
▌3. John Boozman (R)

==== California ====
▌1. Dianne Feinstein (D)
▌3. Kamala Harris (D) (until January 18, 2021)

▌Alex Padilla (D) (from January 20, 2021)

==== Colorado ====
▌2. John Hickenlooper (D)
▌3. Michael Bennet (D)

==== Connecticut ====
▌1. Chris Murphy (D)
▌3. Richard Blumenthal (D)

==== Delaware ====
▌1. Tom Carper (D)
▌2. Chris Coons (D)

==== Florida ====
▌1. Rick Scott (R)
▌3. Marco Rubio (R)

==== Georgia ====
▌2. Jon Ossoff (D) (from January 20, 2021)
▌3. Kelly Loeffler (R) (until January 20, 2021)

▌Raphael Warnock (D) (from January 20, 2021)

==== Hawaii ====
▌1. Mazie Hirono (D)
▌3. Brian Schatz (D)

==== Idaho ====
▌2. Jim Risch (R)
▌3. Mike Crapo (R)

==== Illinois ====
▌2. Dick Durbin (D)
▌3. Tammy Duckworth (D)

==== Indiana ====
▌1. Mike Braun (R)
▌3. Todd Young (R)

==== Iowa ====
▌2. Joni Ernst (R)
▌3. Chuck Grassley (R)

==== Kansas ====
▌2. Roger Marshall (R)
▌3. Jerry Moran (R)

==== Kentucky ====
▌2. Mitch McConnell (R)
▌3. Rand Paul (R)

==== Louisiana ====
▌2. Bill Cassidy (R)
▌3. John Kennedy (R)

==== Maine ====
▌1. Angus King (I) (Note: Caucuses with Democrats.)
▌2. Susan Collins (R)

==== Maryland ====
▌1. Ben Cardin (D)
▌3. Chris Van Hollen (D)

==== Massachusetts ====
▌1. Elizabeth Warren (D)
▌2. Ed Markey (D)

==== Michigan ====
▌1. Debbie Stabenow (D)
▌2. Gary Peters (D)

==== Minnesota ====
▌1. Amy Klobuchar (DFL) (Note: The Minnesota Democratic–Farmer–Labor Party (DFL) is the Minnesota affiliate of the U.S. Democratic Party and its members are counted as Democrats.)
▌2. Tina Smith (DFL)

==== Mississippi ====
▌1. Roger Wicker (R)
▌2. Cindy Hyde-Smith (R)

==== Missouri ====
▌1. Josh Hawley (R)
▌3. Roy Blunt (R)

==== Montana ====
▌1. Jon Tester (D)
▌2. Steve Daines (R)

==== Nebraska ====
▌1. Deb Fischer (R)
▌2. Ben Sasse (R)

==== Nevada ====
▌1. Jacky Rosen (D)
▌3. Catherine Cortez Masto (D)

==== New Hampshire ====
▌2. Jeanne Shaheen (D)
▌3. Maggie Hassan (D)

==== New Jersey ====
▌1. Bob Menendez (D)
▌2. Cory Booker (D)

==== New Mexico ====
▌1. Martin Heinrich (D)
▌2. Ben Ray Luján (D)

==== New York ====
▌1. Kirsten Gillibrand (D)
▌3. Chuck Schumer (D)

==== North Carolina ====
▌2. Thom Tillis (R)
▌3. Richard Burr (R)

==== North Dakota ====
▌1. Kevin Cramer (R)
▌3. John Hoeven (R)

==== Ohio ====
▌1. Sherrod Brown (D)
▌3. Rob Portman (R)

==== Oklahoma ====
▌2. Jim Inhofe (R)
▌3. James Lankford (R)

==== Oregon ====
▌2. Jeff Merkley (D)
▌3. Ron Wyden (D)

==== Pennsylvania ====
▌1. Bob Casey Jr. (D)
▌3. Pat Toomey (R)

==== Rhode Island ====
▌1. Sheldon Whitehouse (D)
▌2. Jack Reed (D)

==== South Carolina ====
▌2. Lindsey Graham (R)
▌3. Tim Scott (R)

==== South Dakota ====
▌2. Mike Rounds (R)
▌3. John Thune (R)

==== Tennessee ====
▌1. Marsha Blackburn (R)
▌2. Bill Hagerty (R)

==== Texas ====
▌1. Ted Cruz (R)
▌2. John Cornyn (R)

==== Utah ====
▌1. Mitt Romney (R)
▌3. Mike Lee (R)

==== Vermont ====
▌1. Bernie Sanders (I)
▌3. Patrick Leahy (D)

==== Virginia ====
▌1. Tim Kaine (D)
▌2. Mark Warner (D)

==== Washington ====
▌1. Maria Cantwell (D)
▌3. Patty Murray (D)

==== West Virginia ====
▌1. Joe Manchin (D)
▌2. Shelley Moore Capito (R)

==== Wisconsin ====
▌1. Tammy Baldwin (D)
▌3. Ron Johnson (R)

==== Wyoming ====
▌1. John Barrasso (R)
▌2. Cynthia Lummis (R)

Current Senate composition by state and party 2 Democrats (21 states) 1 Democrat and 1 Independent who caucuses with Democrats (1 state) 1 Democrat and 1 Republican (5 states) 1 Republican and 1 Independent who caucuses with Democrats (1 state) 2 Republicans (22 states)

Senate Democratic leadership
(minority until January 20, 2021; majority thereafter)

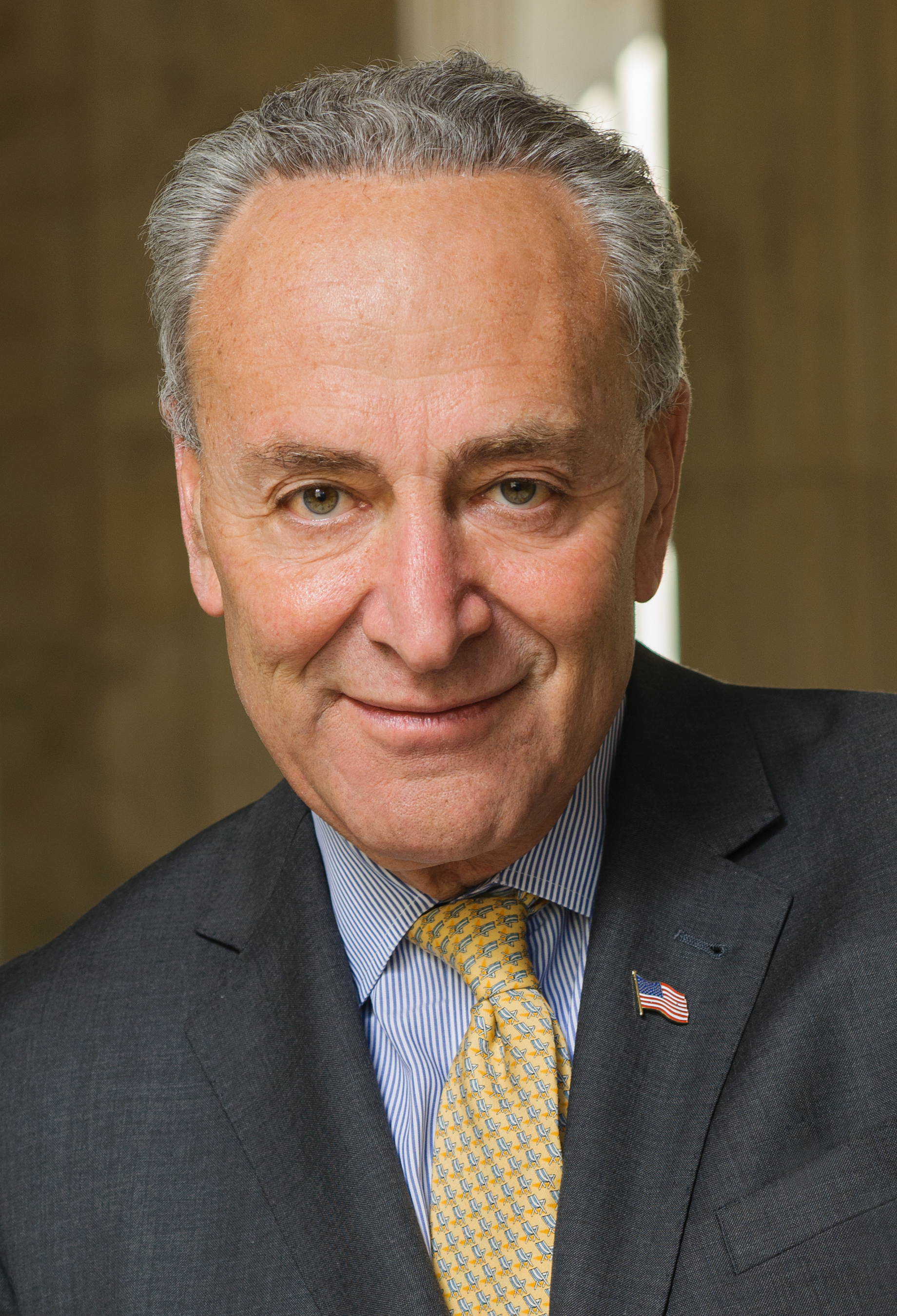
Democratic leader
Chuck Schumer

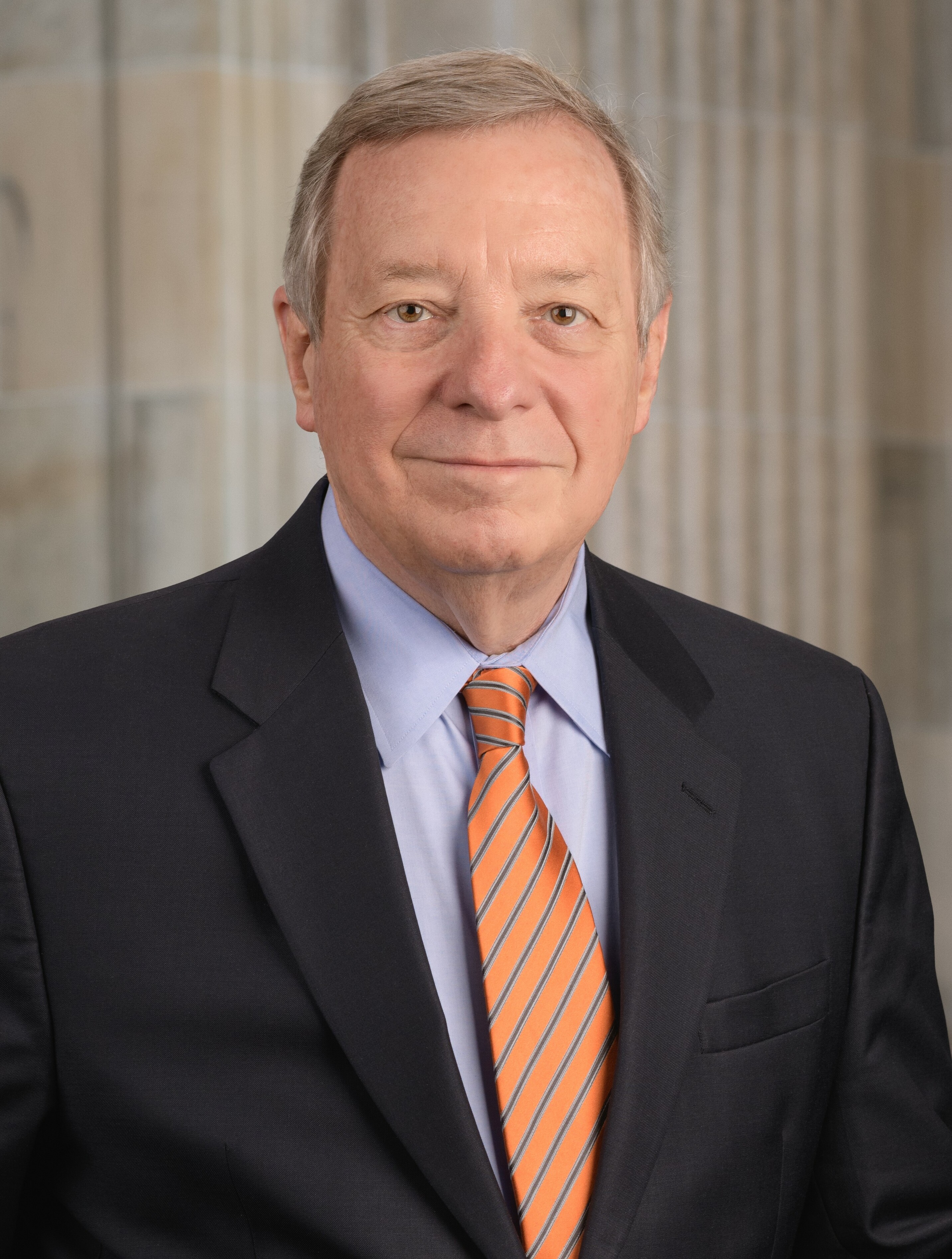
Democratic whip
Dick Durbin

Senate Republican leadership
(majority until January 20, 2021; minority thereafter)

Republican leader
Mitch McConnell

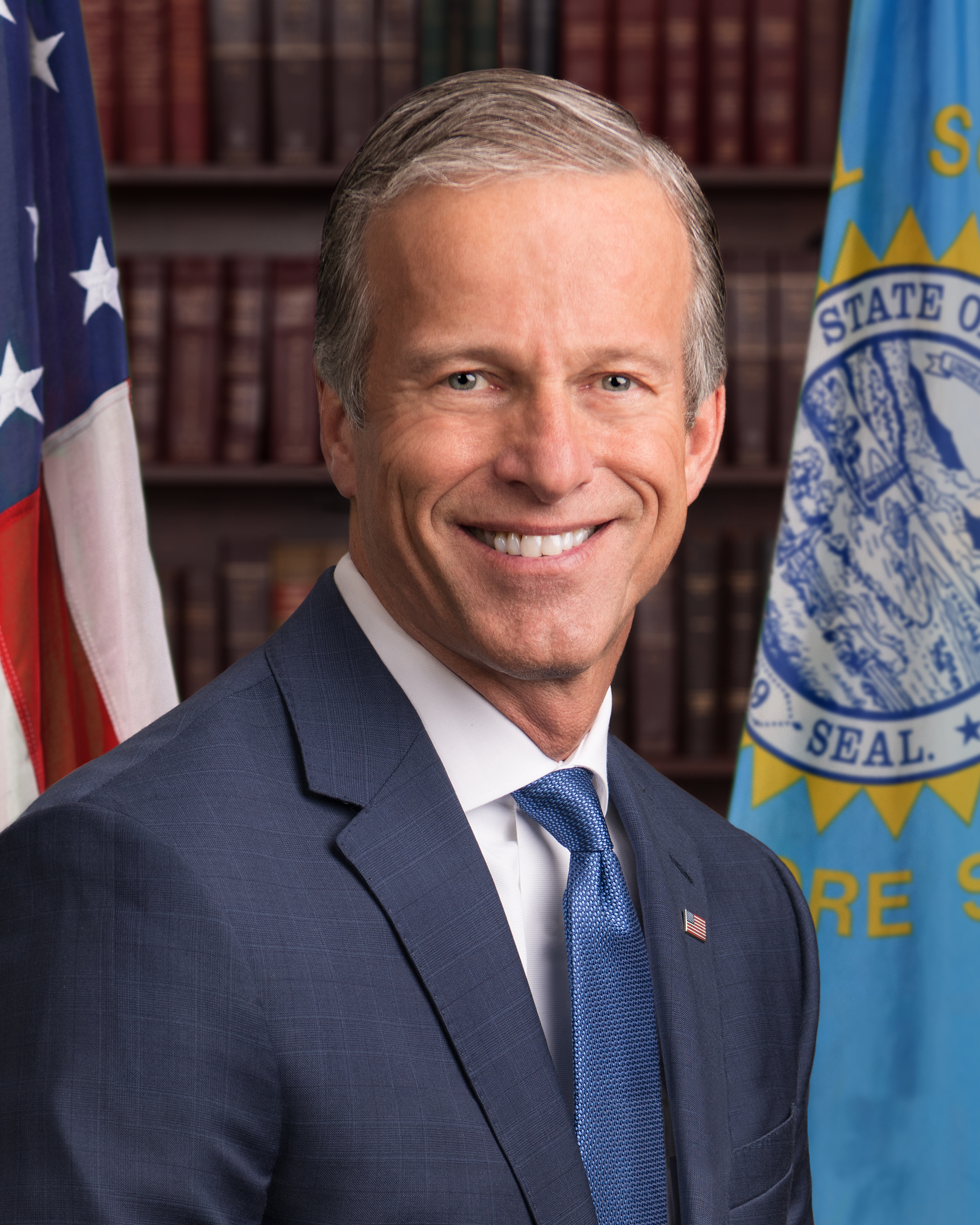
Republican whip
John Thune

=== Representatives ===
All 435 seats for voting members, along with the six non-voting delegates were filled by election in November 2020.

==== Alabama ====
▌1. Jerry Carl (R)
▌2. Barry Moore (R)
▌3. Mike Rogers (R)
▌4. Robert Aderholt (R)
▌5. Mo Brooks (R)
▌6. Gary Palmer (R)
▌7. Terri Sewell (D)

==== Alaska ====
▌At-large. Don Young (R) (until March 18, 2022)

▌Mary Peltola (D) (from September 13, 2022)

==== Arizona ====
▌1. Tom O'Halleran (D)
▌2. Ann Kirkpatrick (D)
▌3. Raúl Grijalva (D)
▌4. Paul Gosar (R)
▌5. Andy Biggs (R)
▌6. David Schweikert (R)
▌7. Ruben Gallego (D)
▌8. Debbie Lesko (R)
▌9. Greg Stanton (D)

==== Arkansas ====
▌1. Rick Crawford (R)
▌2. French Hill (R)
▌3. Steve Womack (R)
▌4. Bruce Westerman (R)

==== California ====
▌1. Doug LaMalfa (R)
▌2. Jared Huffman (D)
▌3. John Garamendi (D)
▌4. Tom McClintock (R)
▌5. Mike Thompson (D)
▌6. Doris Matsui (D)
▌7. Ami Bera (D)
▌8. Jay Obernolte (R)
▌9. Jerry McNerney (D)
▌10. Josh Harder (D)
▌11. Mark DeSaulnier (D)
▌12. Nancy Pelosi (D)
▌13. Barbara Lee (D)
▌14. Jackie Speier (D)
▌15. Eric Swalwell (D)
▌16. Jim Costa (D)
▌17. Ro Khanna (D)
▌18. Anna Eshoo (D)
▌19. Zoe Lofgren (D)
▌20. Jimmy Panetta (D)
▌21. David Valadao (R)
▌22. Devin Nunes (R) (until January 1, 2022)

▌Connie Conway (from June 14, 2022)

▌23. Kevin McCarthy (R)
▌24. Salud Carbajal (D)
▌25. Mike Garcia (R)
▌26. Julia Brownley (D)
▌27. Judy Chu (D)
▌28. Adam Schiff (D)
▌29. Tony Cárdenas (D)
▌30. Brad Sherman (D)
▌31. Pete Aguilar (D)
▌32. Grace Napolitano (D)
▌33. Ted Lieu (D)
▌34. Jimmy Gomez (D)
▌35. Norma Torres (D)
▌36. Raul Ruiz (D)
▌37. Karen Bass (D) (until December 9, 2022, vacant thereafter)
▌38. Linda Sánchez (D)
▌39. Young Kim (R)
▌40. Lucille Roybal-Allard (D)
▌41. Mark Takano (D)
▌42. Ken Calvert (R)
▌43. Maxine Waters (D)
▌44. Nanette Barragán (D)
▌45. Katie Porter (D)
▌46. Lou Correa (D)
▌47. Alan Lowenthal (D)
▌48. Michelle Steel (R)
▌49. Mike Levin (D)
▌50. Darrell Issa (R)
▌51. Juan Vargas (D)
▌52. Scott Peters (D)
▌53. Sara Jacobs (D)

==== Colorado ====
▌1. Diana DeGette (D)
▌2. Joe Neguse (D)
▌3. Lauren Boebert (R)
▌4. Ken Buck (R)
▌5. Doug Lamborn (R)
▌6. Jason Crow (D)
▌7. Ed Perlmutter (D)

==== Connecticut ====
▌1. John B. Larson (D)
▌2. Joe Courtney (D)
▌3. Rosa DeLauro (D)
▌4. Jim Himes (D)
▌5. Jahana Hayes (D)

==== Delaware ====
▌At-large. Lisa Blunt Rochester (D)

==== Florida ====
▌1. Matt Gaetz (R)
▌2. Neal Dunn (R)
▌3. Kat Cammack (R)
▌4. John Rutherford (R)
▌5. Al Lawson (D)
▌6. Mike Waltz (R)
▌7. Stephanie Murphy (D)
▌8. Bill Posey (R)
▌9. Darren Soto (D)
▌10. Val Demings (D)
▌11. Daniel Webster (R)
▌12. Gus Bilirakis (R)
▌13. Charlie Crist (D) (until August 31, 2022, vacant thereafter)
▌14. Kathy Castor (D)
▌15. Scott Franklin (R)
▌16. Vern Buchanan (R)
▌17. Greg Steube (R)
▌18. Brian Mast (R)
▌19. Byron Donalds (R)
▌20. Alcee Hastings (D) (until April 6, 2021)

▌Sheila Cherfilus-McCormick (D) (from January 18, 2022)

▌21. Lois Frankel (D)
▌22. Ted Deutch (D) (until September 30, 2022, vacant thereafter)
▌23. Debbie Wasserman Schultz (D)
▌24. Frederica Wilson (D)
▌25. Mario Díaz-Balart (R)
▌26. Carlos A. Giménez (R)
▌27. María Elvira Salazar (R)

==== Georgia ====
▌1. Buddy Carter (R)
▌2. Sanford Bishop (D)
▌3. Drew Ferguson (R)
▌4. Hank Johnson (D)
▌5. Nikema Williams (D)
▌6. Lucy McBath (D)
▌7. Carolyn Bourdeaux (D)
▌8. Austin Scott (R)
▌9. Andrew Clyde (R)
▌10. Jody Hice (R)
▌11. Barry Loudermilk (R)
▌12. Rick Allen (R)
▌13. David Scott (D)
▌14. Marjorie Taylor Greene (R)

==== Hawaii ====
▌1. Ed Case (D)
▌2. Kai Kahele (D)

==== Idaho ====
▌1. Russ Fulcher (R)
▌2. Mike Simpson (R)

==== Illinois ====
▌1. Bobby Rush (D)
▌2. Robin Kelly (D)
▌3. Marie Newman (D)
▌4. Chuy García (D)
▌5. Mike Quigley (D)
▌6. Sean Casten (D)
▌7. Danny Davis (D)
▌8. Raja Krishnamoorthi (D)
▌9. Jan Schakowsky (D)
▌10. Brad Schneider (D)
▌11. Bill Foster (D)
▌12. Mike Bost (R)
▌13. Rodney Davis (R)
▌14. Lauren Underwood (D)
▌15. Mary Miller (R)
▌16. Adam Kinzinger (R)
▌17. Cheri Bustos (D)
▌18. Darin LaHood (R)

==== Indiana ====
▌1. Frank J. Mrvan (D)
▌2. Jackie Walorski (R) (until August 3, 2022)

▌Rudy Yakym (R) (from November 14, 2022)

▌3. Jim Banks (R)
▌4. Jim Baird (R)
▌5. Victoria Spartz (R)
▌6. Greg Pence (R)
▌7. André Carson (D)
▌8. Larry Bucshon (R)
▌9. Trey Hollingsworth (R)

==== Iowa ====
▌1. Ashley Hinson (R)
▌2. Mariannette Miller-Meeks (R) (Note: Miller-Meeks was provisionally seated with the rest of the 117th Congress, pending the challenge by her opponent Rita Hart. Hart withdrew her challenge on March 31, 2021.)
▌3. Cindy Axne (D)
▌4. Randy Feenstra (R)

==== Kansas ====
▌1. Tracey Mann (R)
▌2. Jake LaTurner (R)
▌3. Sharice Davids (D)
▌4. Ron Estes (R)

==== Kentucky ====
▌1. James Comer (R)
▌2. Brett Guthrie (R)
▌3. John Yarmuth (D)
▌4. Thomas Massie (R)
▌5. Hal Rogers (R)
▌6. Andy Barr (R)

==== Louisiana ====
▌1. Steve Scalise (R)
▌2. Cedric Richmond (D) (until January 15, 2021)

▌Troy Carter (D) (from May 11, 2021)

▌3. Clay Higgins (R)
▌4. Mike Johnson (R)
▌5. Julia Letlow (R) (from April 14, 2021)
▌6. Garret Graves (R)

==== Maine ====
▌1. Chellie Pingree (D)
▌2. Jared Golden (D)

==== Maryland ====
▌1. Andy Harris (R)
▌2. Dutch Ruppersberger (D)
▌3. John Sarbanes (D)
▌4. Anthony Brown (D)
▌5. Steny Hoyer (D)
▌6. David Trone (D)
▌7. Kweisi Mfume (D)
▌8. Jamie Raskin (D)

==== Massachusetts ====
▌1. Richard Neal (D)
▌2. Jim McGovern (D)
▌3. Lori Trahan (D)
▌4. Jake Auchincloss (D)
▌5. Katherine Clark (D)
▌6. Seth Moulton (D)
▌7. Ayanna Pressley (D)
▌8. Stephen Lynch (D)
▌9. Bill Keating (D)

==== Michigan ====
▌1. Jack Bergman (R)
▌2. Bill Huizenga (R)
▌3. Peter Meijer (R)
▌4. John Moolenaar (R)
▌5. Dan Kildee (D)
▌6. Fred Upton (R)
▌7. Tim Walberg (R)
▌8. Elissa Slotkin (D)
▌9. Andy Levin (D)
▌10. Lisa McClain (R)
▌11. Haley Stevens (D)
▌12. Debbie Dingell (D)
▌13. Rashida Tlaib (D)
▌14. Brenda Lawrence (D)

==== Minnesota ====
▌1. Jim Hagedorn (R) (until February 17, 2022)

▌Brad Finstad (R) (from August 12, 2022)

▌2. Angie Craig (DFL)
▌3. Dean Phillips (DFL)
▌4. Betty McCollum (DFL)
▌5. Ilhan Omar (DFL)
▌6. Tom Emmer (R)
▌7. Michelle Fischbach (R)
▌8. Pete Stauber (R)

==== Mississippi ====
▌1. Trent Kelly (R)
▌2. Bennie Thompson (D)
▌3. Michael Guest (R)
▌4. Steven Palazzo (R)

==== Missouri ====
▌1. Cori Bush (D)
▌2. Ann Wagner (R)
▌3. Blaine Luetkemeyer (R)
▌4. Vicky Hartzler (R)
▌5. Emanuel Cleaver (D)
▌6. Sam Graves (R)
▌7. Billy Long (R)
▌8. Jason Smith (R)

==== Montana ====
▌At-large. Matt Rosendale (R)

==== Nebraska ====
▌1. Jeff Fortenberry (R) (until March 31, 2022)

▌Mike Flood (R) (from July 12, 2022)

▌2. Don Bacon (R)
▌3. Adrian Smith (R)

==== Nevada ====
▌1. Dina Titus (D)
▌2. Mark Amodei (R)
▌3. Susie Lee (D)
▌4. Steven Horsford (D)

==== New Hampshire ====
▌1. Chris Pappas (D)
▌2. Annie Kuster (D)

==== New Jersey ====
▌1. Donald Norcross (D)
▌2. Jeff Van Drew (R)
▌3. Andy Kim (D)
▌4. Chris Smith (R)
▌5. Josh Gottheimer (D)
▌6. Frank Pallone (D)
▌7. Tom Malinowski (D)
▌8. Albio Sires (D)
▌9. Bill Pascrell (D)
▌10. Donald Payne Jr. (D)
▌11. Mikie Sherrill (D)
▌12. Bonnie Watson Coleman (D)

==== New Mexico ====
▌1. Deb Haaland (D) (until March 16, 2021)

▌Melanie Stansbury (D) (from June 14, 2021)

▌2. Yvette Herrell (R)
▌3. Teresa Leger Fernandez (D)

==== New York ====
▌1. Lee Zeldin (R)
▌2. Andrew Garbarino (R)
▌3. Thomas Suozzi (D)
▌4. Kathleen Rice (D)
▌5. Gregory Meeks (D)
▌6. Grace Meng (D)
▌7. Nydia Velázquez (D)
▌8. Hakeem Jeffries (D)
▌9. Yvette Clarke (D)
▌10. Jerry Nadler (D)
▌11. Nicole Malliotakis (R)
▌12. Carolyn Maloney (D)
▌13. Adriano Espaillat (D)
▌14. Alexandria Ocasio-Cortez (D)
▌15. Ritchie Torres (D)
▌16. Jamaal Bowman (D)
▌17. Mondaire Jones (D)
▌18. Sean Patrick Maloney (D)
▌19. Antonio Delgado (D) (until May 25, 2022)

▌ Pat Ryan (D) (from September 13, 2022)

▌20. Paul Tonko (D)
▌21. Elise Stefanik (R)
▌22. Claudia Tenney (R) (from February 11, 2021)
▌23. Tom Reed (R) (until May 10, 2022)

▌Joe Sempolinski (R) (from September 13, 2022)

▌24. John Katko (R)
▌25. Joseph Morelle (D)
▌26. Brian Higgins (D)
▌27. Chris Jacobs (R)

==== North Carolina ====
▌1. G. K. Butterfield (D) (until December 30, 2022, vacant thereafter)
▌2. Deborah Ross (D)
▌3. Greg Murphy (R)
▌4. David Price (D)
▌5. Virginia Foxx (R)
▌6. Kathy Manning (D)
▌7. David Rouzer (R)
▌8. Richard Hudson (R)
▌9. Dan Bishop (R)
▌10. Patrick McHenry (R)
▌11. Madison Cawthorn (R)
▌12. Alma Adams (D)
▌13. Ted Budd (R)

==== North Dakota ====
▌At-large. Kelly Armstrong (R)

==== Ohio ====
▌1. Steve Chabot (R)
▌2. Brad Wenstrup (R)
▌3. Joyce Beatty (D)
▌4. Jim Jordan (R)
▌5. Bob Latta (R)
▌6. Bill Johnson (R)
▌7. Bob Gibbs (R)
▌8. Warren Davidson (R)
▌9. Marcy Kaptur (D)
▌10. Mike Turner (R)
▌11. Marcia Fudge (D) (until March 10, 2021)

▌Shontel Brown (D) (from November 4, 2021)

▌12. Troy Balderson (R)
▌13. Tim Ryan (D)
▌14. David Joyce (R)
▌15. Steve Stivers (R) (until May 16, 2021)

▌Mike Carey (R) (from November 4, 2021)

▌16. Anthony Gonzalez (R)

==== Oklahoma ====
▌1. Kevin Hern (R)
▌2. Markwayne Mullin (R)
▌3. Frank Lucas (R)
▌4. Tom Cole (R)
▌5. Stephanie Bice (R)

==== Oregon ====
▌1. Suzanne Bonamici (D)
▌2. Cliff Bentz (R)
▌3. Earl Blumenauer (D)
▌4. Peter DeFazio (D)
▌5. Kurt Schrader (D)

==== Pennsylvania ====
▌1. Brian Fitzpatrick (R)
▌2. Brendan Boyle (D)
▌3. Dwight Evans (D)
▌4. Madeleine Dean (D)
▌5. Mary Gay Scanlon (D)
▌6. Chrissy Houlahan (D)
▌7. Susan Wild (D)
▌8. Matt Cartwright (D)
▌9. Dan Meuser (R)
▌10. Scott Perry (R)
▌11. Lloyd Smucker (R)
▌12. Fred Keller (R)
▌13. John Joyce (R)
▌14. Guy Reschenthaler (R)
▌15. Glenn Thompson (R)
▌16. Mike Kelly (R)
▌17. Conor Lamb (D)
▌18. Mike Doyle (D) (until December 31, 2022, vacant thereafter)

==== Rhode Island ====
▌1. David Cicilline (D)
▌2. James Langevin (D)

==== South Carolina ====
▌1. Nancy Mace (R)
▌2. Joe Wilson (R)
▌3. Jeff Duncan (R)
▌4. William Timmons (R)
▌5. Ralph Norman (R)
▌6. Jim Clyburn (D)
▌7. Tom Rice (R)

==== South Dakota ====
▌At-large. Dusty Johnson (R)

==== Tennessee ====
▌1. Diana Harshbarger (R)
▌2. Tim Burchett (R)
▌3. Chuck Fleischmann (R)
▌4. Scott DesJarlais (R)
▌5. Jim Cooper (D)
▌6. John Rose (R)
▌7. Mark Green (R)
▌8. David Kustoff (R)
▌9. Steve Cohen (D)

==== Texas ====
▌1. Louie Gohmert (R)
▌2. Dan Crenshaw (R)
▌3. Van Taylor (R)
▌4. Pat Fallon (R)
▌5. Lance Gooden (R)
▌6. Ron Wright (R) (until February 7, 2021)

▌Jake Ellzey (R) (from July 30, 2021)

▌7. Lizzie Fletcher (D)
▌8. Kevin Brady (R)
▌9. Al Green (D)
▌10. Michael McCaul (R)
▌11. August Pfluger (R)
▌12. Kay Granger (R)
▌13. Ronny Jackson (R)
▌14. Randy Weber (R)
▌15. Vicente Gonzalez (D)
▌16. Veronica Escobar (D)
▌17. Pete Sessions (R)
▌18. Sheila Jackson Lee (D)
▌19. Jodey Arrington (R)
▌20. Joaquin Castro (D)
▌21. Chip Roy (R)
▌22. Troy Nehls (R)
▌23. Tony Gonzales (R)
▌24. Beth Van Duyne (R)
▌25. Roger Williams (R)
▌26. Michael C. Burgess (R)
▌27. Michael Cloud (R)
▌28. Henry Cuellar (D)
▌29. Sylvia Garcia (D)
▌30. Eddie Bernice Johnson (D)
▌31. John Carter (R)
▌32. Colin Allred (D)
▌33. Marc Veasey (D)
▌34. Filemon Vela Jr. (D) (until March 31, 2022)

▌Mayra Flores (R) (from June 21, 2022)

▌35. Lloyd Doggett (D)
▌36. Brian Babin (R)

==== Utah ====
▌1. Blake Moore (R)
▌2. Chris Stewart (R)
▌3. John Curtis (R)
▌4. Burgess Owens (R)

==== Vermont ====
▌At-large. Peter Welch (D)

==== Virginia ====
▌1. Rob Wittman (R)
▌2. Elaine Luria (D)
▌3. Bobby Scott (D)
▌4. Donald McEachin (D) (until November 28, 2022, vacant thereafter)
▌5. Bob Good (R)
▌6. Ben Cline (R)
▌7. Abigail Spanberger (D)
▌8. Don Beyer (D)
▌9. Morgan Griffith (R)
▌10. Jennifer Wexton (D)
▌11. Gerry Connolly (D)

==== Washington ====
▌1. Suzan DelBene (D)
▌2. Rick Larsen (D)
▌3. Jaime Herrera Beutler (R)
▌4. Dan Newhouse (R)
▌5. Cathy McMorris Rodgers (R)
▌6. Derek Kilmer (D)
▌7. Pramila Jayapal (D)
▌8. Kim Schrier (D)
▌9. Adam Smith (D)
▌10. Marilyn Strickland (D)

==== West Virginia ====
▌1. David McKinley (R)
▌2. Alex Mooney (R)
▌3. Carol Miller (R)

==== Wisconsin ====
▌1. Bryan Steil (R)
▌2. Mark Pocan (D)
▌3. Ron Kind (D)
▌4. Gwen Moore (D)
▌5. Scott Fitzgerald (R)
▌6. Glenn Grothman (R)
▌7. Tom Tiffany (R)
▌8. Mike Gallagher (R)

==== Wyoming ====
▌At-large. Liz Cheney (R)

==== Non-voting members ====
▌American Samoa. Amata Coleman Radewagen (R)
▌District of Columbia. Eleanor Holmes Norton (D)
▌Guam. Michael San Nicolas (D)
▌Northern Mariana Islands. Gregorio Sablan (D)
▌▌Puerto Rico. Jenniffer González-Colón (PNP/R)
▌United States Virgin Islands. Stacey Plaskett (D)

House composition by district at the end of the congress, January 3, 2023 Held by Democrats Held by Republicans Vacant

House seats by party holding majority in state: D: / 100% / 80–99% / 70–79% / 60–69% / 51–59% / 50%; R: / 100% / 80–99% / 70–79% / 60–69% / 51–59% / 50%

House majority leadership

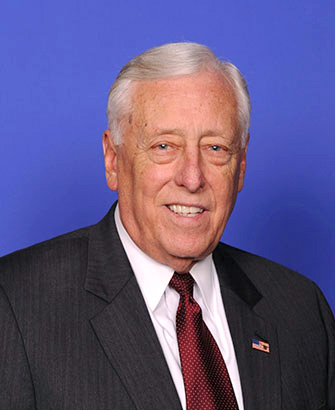
Democratic leader
Steny Hoyer

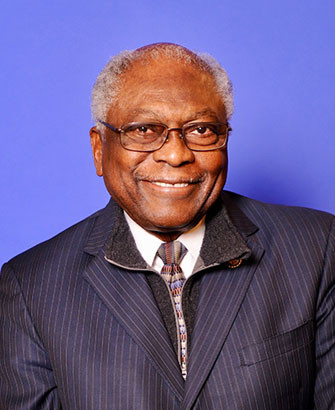
Democratic whip
Jim Clyburn

House minority leadership

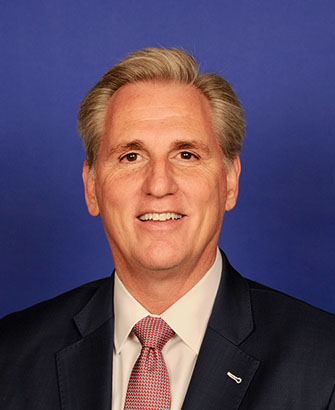
Republican leader
Kevin McCarthy

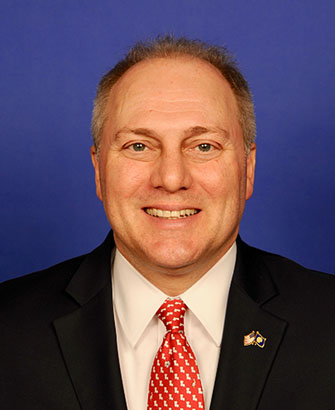
Republican whip
Steve Scalise

== Changes in membership ==
Senate changes
State (class)	Vacated by	Reason for change	Successor	Date of successor's formal installation (Note: When seated or oath administered, not necessarily when service began.)
Georgia (2)	Vacant	David Perdue's (R) term expired January 3, 2021, before a runoff election could be held. Successor elected January 5, 2021.	Jon Ossoff (D)	January 20, 2021
California (3)	Kamala Harris (D)	Incumbent resigned on January 18, 2021, to become U.S. Vice President. Successor appointed January 18, 2021, to complete the term ending January 3, 2023, and later elected to finish in the final weeks of the Congress and a full six-year term.	Alex Padilla (D)	January 20, 2021
Georgia (3)	Kelly Loeffler (R)	Appointee lost election to finish the term. Successor elected January 5, 2021, to finish the term ending January 3, 2023.	Raphael Warnock (D)	January 20, 2021

House changes
District	Vacated by	Reason for change	Successor	Date of successor's formal installation
New York 22	Vacant	Anthony Brindisi's (D) term expired January 3, 2021, and the seat remained vacant due to the result of the 2020 election being disputed. On February 5, 2021, a judge declared a winner.	Claudia Tenney (R)	February 11, 2021
Louisiana 5	Vacant	Member-elect Luke Letlow (R) died from COVID-19 on December 29, 2020, before his term started. A special election was held on March 20, 2021.	Julia Letlow (R)	April 14, 2021
Louisiana 2	Cedric Richmond (D)	Resigned January 15, 2021, to become Senior Advisor to the President and director of the Office of Public Liaison. A special election was held on March 20, 2021, and a runoff was held on April 24.	Troy Carter (D)	May 11, 2021
Texas 6	Ron Wright (R)	Died from COVID-19 on February 7, 2021. A special election was held on May 1, 2021, and a runoff was held on July 27.	Jake Ellzey (R)	July 30, 2021
Ohio 11	Marcia Fudge (D)	Resigned March 10, 2021, to become U.S. Secretary of Housing and Urban Development. A special election was held on November 2, 2021.	Shontel Brown (D)	November 4, 2021
New Mexico 1	Deb Haaland (D)	Resigned March 16, 2021, to become U.S. Secretary of the Interior. A special election was held on June 1, 2021.	Melanie Stansbury (D)	June 14, 2021
Florida 20	Alcee Hastings (D)	Died from pancreatic cancer on April 6, 2021. A special election was held on January 11, 2022.	Sheila Cherfilus-McCormick (D)	January 18, 2022
Ohio 15	Steve Stivers (R)	Resigned May 16, 2021, to become the president and CEO of the Ohio Chamber of Commerce. A special election was held on November 2, 2021.	Mike Carey (R)	November 4, 2021
California 22	Devin Nunes (R)	Resigned January 1, 2022, to become the CEO of Trump Media & Technology Group. A special election was held on June 7, 2022.	Connie Conway (R)	June 14, 2022
Minnesota 1	Jim Hagedorn (R)	Died from kidney cancer on February 17, 2022. A special election was held on August 9, 2022.	Brad Finstad (R)	August 12, 2022
Alaska at-large	Don Young (R)	Died on March 18, 2022. A special election was held on August 16, 2022.	Mary Peltola (D)	September 13, 2022
Nebraska 1	Jeff Fortenberry (R)	Resigned March 31, 2022, due to criminal conviction. A special election was held on June 28, 2022.	Mike Flood (R)	July 12, 2022
Texas 34	Filemon Vela Jr. (D)	Resigned March 31, 2022, to join Akin Gump Strauss Hauer & Feld. A special election was held on June 14, 2022.	Mayra Flores (R)	June 21, 2022
New York 23	Tom Reed (R)	Resigned May 10, 2022, to join Prime Policy Group. A special election was held on August 23, 2022.	Joe Sempolinski (R)	September 13, 2022
New York 19	Antonio Delgado (D)	Resigned May 25, 2022, to become lieutenant governor of New York. A special election was held on August 23, 2022.	Pat Ryan (D)	September 13, 2022
Indiana 2	Jackie Walorski (R)	Died in a car collision on August 3, 2022. A special election was held on November 8, 2022.	Rudy Yakym (R)	November 14, 2022
Florida 13	Charlie Crist (D)	Resigned August 31, 2022, to focus on the 2022 Florida gubernatorial election.	Vacant until the next Congress	
Florida 22	Ted Deutch (D)	Resigned September 30, 2022, to become CEO of the American Jewish Committee.	Vacant until the next Congress	
Virginia 4	Donald McEachin (D)	Died November 28, 2022, from colorectal cancer.	Vacant until the next Congress	
California 37	Karen Bass (D)	Resigned December 9, 2022, to become the Mayor of Los Angeles.	Vacant until the next Congress	
North Carolina 1	G. K. Butterfield (D)	Resigned December 30, 2022, to accept a lobbying position.	Vacant until the next Congress	
Pennsylvania 18	Mike Doyle (D)	Resigned December 31, 2022, to join K&L Gates.	Vacant until the next Congress	

== Committees ==
Section contents: Senate, House, Joint

=== Senate committees ===
Prior to the passing of an organizing resolution on February 3, 2021, chairs of Senate committees remained the same as in the 116th Congress. Where the chair had retired (as in the Agriculture, Budget, and HELP committees), the chair was vacant.

Committee	Chair	Ranking Member
Aging (Special)	Bob Casey Jr. (D-PA)	Tim Scott (R-SC)
Agriculture, Nutrition and Forestry	Debbie Stabenow (D-MI)	John Boozman (R-AR)
Appropriations	Patrick Leahy (D-VT)	Richard Shelby (R-AL)
Armed Services	Jack Reed (D-RI)	Jim Inhofe (R-OK)
Banking, Housing and Urban Affairs	Sherrod Brown (D-OH)	Pat Toomey (R-PA)
Budget	Bernie Sanders (I-VT)	Lindsey Graham (R-SC)
Commerce, Science and Transportation	Maria Cantwell (D-WA)	Roger Wicker (R-MS)
Energy and Natural Resources	Joe Manchin (D-WV)	John Barrasso (R-WY)
Environment and Public Works	Tom Carper (D-DE)	Shelley Moore Capito (R-WV)
Ethics (Select)	Chris Coons (D-DE)	James Lankford (R-OK)
Finance	Ron Wyden (D-OR)	Mike Crapo (R-ID)
Foreign Relations	Bob Menendez (D-NJ)	Jim Risch (R-ID)
Health, Education, Labor and Pensions	Patty Murray (D-WA)	Richard Burr (R-NC)
Homeland Security and Governmental Affairs	Gary Peters (D-MI)	Rob Portman (R-OH)
Indian Affairs (Permanent Select)	Brian Schatz (D-HI)	Lisa Murkowski (R-AK)
Intelligence (Select)	Mark Warner (D-VA)	Marco Rubio (R-FL)
International Narcotics Control (Permanent Caucus)	Sheldon Whitehouse (D-RI)	Chuck Grassley (R-IA)
Judiciary	Dick Durbin (D-IL)	Chuck Grassley (R-IA)
Rules and Administration	Amy Klobuchar (D-MN)	Roy Blunt (R-MO)
Small Business and Entrepreneurship	Ben Cardin (D-MD)	Rand Paul (R-KY)
Veterans' Affairs	Jon Tester (D-MT)	Jerry Moran (R-KS)

=== House committees ===
Committee	Chair	Ranking Member
Agriculture	David Scott (D-GA)	Glenn Thompson (R-PA)
Appropriations	Rosa DeLauro (D-CT)	Kay Granger (R-TX)
Armed Services	Adam Smith (D-WA)	Mike Rogers (R-AL)
Budget	John Yarmuth (D-KY)	Jason Smith (R-MO)
Climate Crisis (Select)	Kathy Castor (D-FL)	Garret Graves (R-LA)
Economic Disparity and Fairness in Growth (Select)	Jim Himes (D-CT)	Bryan Steil (R-WI)
Education and Labor	Bobby Scott (D-VA)	Virginia Foxx (R-NC)
Energy and Commerce	Frank Pallone (D-NJ)	Cathy McMorris Rodgers (R-WA)
Ethics	Susan Wild (D-PA) (Note: Wild was named chair when Ted Deutch resigned from office on September 30, 2022.)	Michael Guest (R-MS) (Note: Guest was named ranking member when Jackie Walorski died in office on August 3, 2022.)
Financial Services	Maxine Waters (D-CA)	Patrick McHenry (R-NC)
Foreign Affairs	Gregory Meeks (D-NY)	Mike McCaul (R-TX)
Homeland Security	Bennie Thompson (D-MS)	John Katko (R-NY)
House Administration	Zoe Lofgren (D-CA)	Rodney Davis (R-IL)
Intelligence (Permanent Select)	Adam Schiff (D-CA)	Mike Turner (R-OH)
Judiciary	Jerry Nadler (D-NY)	Jim Jordan (R-OH)
Modernization of Congress (Select)	Derek Kilmer (D-WA)	William Timmons (R-SC)
Natural Resources	Raúl Grijalva (D-AZ)	Bruce Westerman (R-AR)
Oversight and Reform	Carolyn Maloney (D-NY)	Jim Comer (R-KY)
Rules	Jim McGovern (D-MA)	Tom Cole (R-OK)
Science, Space and Technology	Eddie Bernice Johnson (D-TX)	Frank Lucas (R-OK)
Small Business	Nydia Velázquez (D-NY)	Blaine Luetkemeyer (R-MO)
Transportation and Infrastructure	Peter DeFazio (D-OR)	Sam Graves (R-MO)
Veterans' Affairs	Mark Takano (D-CA)	Mike Bost (R-IL)
Ways and Means	Richard Neal (D-MA)	Kevin Brady (R-TX)

=== Joint committees ===
Committee	Chair	Vice Chair	Ranking Member	Vice Ranking Member
Economic	Rep. Don Beyer (D-VA)	Sen. Martin Heinrich (D-NM)	Sen. Mike Lee (R-UT)	Rep. David Schweikert (R-AZ)
Inaugural Ceremonies (Special) until January 20, 2021	Sen. Roy Blunt (R-MO)	Rep. Nancy Pelosi (D-CA)	Rep. Kevin McCarthy (R-CA)	Sen. Amy Klobuchar (D-MN)
Library	Rep. Zoe Lofgren (D-CA)	Sen. Amy Klobuchar (D-MN)	Sen. Roy Blunt (R-MO)	Rep. Rodney Davis (R-IL)
Printing	Sen. Amy Klobuchar (D-MN)	Rep. Zoe Lofgren (D-CA)	Rep. Rodney Davis (R-IL)	Sen. Roy Blunt (R-MO)
Taxation (Note: The Joint Taxation Committee leadership rotate the chair and vice chair and the ranking members between the House and Senate at the start of each session in the middle of the congressional term. The first session leadership is shown here.)	Rep. Richard Neal (D-MA)	Sen. Ron Wyden (D-OR)	Sen. Mike Crapo (R-ID)	Rep. Kevin Brady (R-TX)

== Officers and officials ==
=== Senate officers and officials ===
- Chaplain: Barry Black (Seventh-day Adventist)
- Curator: Melinda Smith
- Historian: Betty Koed
- Librarian: Leona I. Faust
- Parliamentarian: Elizabeth MacDonough
- Secretary:
  - Julie E. Adams until March 1, 2021
  - Sonceria Berry from March 1, 2021
- Sergeant at Arms and Doorkeeper:
  - Michael C. Stenger, until January 7, 2021
  - Jennifer Hemingway, from January 7 to March 22, 2021 (acting)
  - Lt. Gen. Karen Gibson since March 22, 2021
    - Deputy Sergeant at Arms and Doorkeeper: Kelly Fado, since March 22, 2021

=== House officers and officials ===
- Chaplain: Margaret G. Kibben (Presbyterian)
- Chief Administrative Officer: Catherine Szpindor
- Clerk: Cheryl L. Johnson
- Historian: Matthew Wasniewski
- Parliamentarian: Jason Smith
- Reading Clerks: Tylease Alli (D) and Susan Cole (R)
- Sergeant at Arms:
  - Paul D. Irving, until January 7, 2021
  - Timothy P. Blodgett, January 12, 2021 – March 26, 2021 (acting)
  - William J. Walker, starting April 26, 2021

=== Legislative branch agency directors ===
- Architect of the Capitol: Brett Blanton
- Attending Physician: Brian P. Monahan
- Comptroller General of the United States: Gene Dodaro
- Director of the Congressional Budget Office: Phillip Swagel
- Librarian of Congress: Carla Diane Hayden
- Director of the U.S. Government Publishing Office: Vacant
- Counselor of the Office of the Law Revision Counsel: Ralph V. Seep
- Counselor of the Office of House Legislative Counsel: Ernest Wade Ballou Jr.
- Public Printer of the United States: Hugh N. Halpern

== See also ==
- List of new members of the 117th United States Congress
- 2020 United States elections (elections leading to this Congress)
  - 2020 United States presidential election
  - 2020 United States Senate elections
  - 2020 United States House of Representatives elections
- 2021 United States elections (elections during this Congress)
  - 2021 United States House of Representatives elections
- 2022 United States elections (elections during this Congress, leading to the next Congress)
  - 2022 United States Senate elections
  - 2022 United States House of Representatives elections
