= Scientific Integrity in Policymaking =

Report published by the Union of Concerned Scientists during Bush Administration

"Scientific Integrity in Policymaking: An Investigation into the Bush Administration's Misuse of Science" is the title of a report published by the Union of Concerned Scientists in February, 2004. The report was the culmination of an investigation of the Bush administration's objectivity in science, and ultimately a criticism thereof.

== "Suppression and distortion of research findings" ==
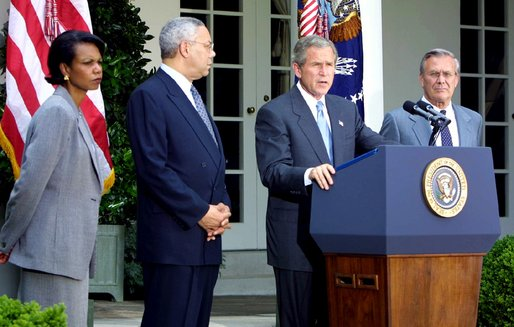
Rice, Powell, Bush, and Rumsfeld

A central thesis of the report, according to the Executive Summary (on page 2 of the text), was that the Bush administration had behaved in ways considered to be consistent with the following three situations.

1. Epidemic altering and concealing of scientific information by senior officials in various federal agencies
2. Active censorship of scientific information that the administration considered threatening to its own philosophies
3. Restriction of the ability of government-supported scientists to freely communicate scientific ideas related to "sensitive" issues

== "An unprecedented pattern of behavior" ==
In "Part III", the text of the report posits that the aforementioned activities are unprecedented in the history of the United States. The report lists the following persons and organization who had supposedly acted or made statements to support this claim.

This list is sorted first by category, then by the order in which the persons or organizations are mentioned in the report.

- Organization
  - REP America
- Persons
  - Ruckelshaus, William
  - Train, Russell
  - Panofsky, Dr. Wolfgang H. K.
  - Goldberger, Dr. Marvin
  - Scarlett, Dr. Margaret
  - Kennedy, Donald
  - Bromley, Dr. D. Allan
  - Branscomb, Professor Lewis M.
  - Goldman, Dr. Lynn

== Recommendations by the Union ==
Page 29 of the report states: "This behavior by the administration violates the central premise of the scientific method, and is therefore of particularly grave concern to the scientific community." It then goes on, in a short section titled "Conclusions and Recommendations: What's at Stake" at the end of the report, to provide recommendations for "restoring scientific integrity to federal policymaking" (page 30). These recommendations (on pages 30–31) include a suggestion for the President of the United States to issue executive orders, and other actions, that would prevent further "abuse"; for the United States Congress to hold appropriate hearings, consider the consequences of statutory law under its influence, increase the amount of publicly available scientific information, and establish an organization to guide Congress in its deliberations in technical matters; for scientists to raise awareness of the aforementioned issues and provide public policy recommendations; for the public to exercise its political influence in a constructive manner.

== Response ==
On April 2, 2004, the White House Office of Science and Technology Policy issued a statement by Dr. John Marburger, the director of OSTP, that claims the descriptions of the incidents in the UCS report are all "false," "wrong," or "a distortion." He said he was disappointed with the report and dismissed it as "biased.".

== The report's table of contents ==
The following is a duplication of the report's table of contents.

- Executive summary
- Part I: Suppression and distortion of research findings at federal agencies
  - Distorting and suppressing climate change research
  - Censoring information on air quality
    - Mercury emissions from power plants
    - Addressing multiple air pollutants
  - Distorting scientific knowledge on reproductive health issues
    - Abstinence-only education
    - HIV/AIDS
    - Breast cancer
  - Suppressing analysis on airborne bacteria
  - Misrepresenting evidence on Iraq's aluminum tubes
  - Manipulation of science regarding the endangered species act
    - Missouri River
  - Manipulating the scientific process on forest management
  - OMB rulemaking on "peer review"
- Part II: Undermining the quality and integrity of the appointment process
  - Industry influence on lead poisoning prevention panel
  - Political litmus tests on workplace safety panel
  - Non-scientist in senior advisory role to the President
  - Underqualified candidates in health advisory roles
    - The FDA's Reproductive Health Advisory Committee
    - Presidential Advisory Council on HIV/AIDS
  - Litmus tests for scientific appointees
    - National Institute on Drug Abuse
    - Army Science Board
  - Dismissal of nuclear weapons and arms control panels
    - National Nuclear Security Administration panel
    - Arms control panel
- Part III: An unprecedented pattern of behavior
  - Disseminating research from federal agencies
  - Irregularities in appointments to scientific advisory panels
- Conclusions and recommendations: What's at stake
  - Restoring scientific integrity to federal policy making
- Appendices
  - EPA memo on climate section of the Report on the Environment
  - USDA "sensitive issue" list

== Associated Statement "Restoring Scientific Integrity in Policymaking" ==
At the time of issue of this report, the UCS released a statement supporting the criticisms detailed in the above report. This statement was originally signed by the 62 prominent scientists listed below. Since that time it has gathered support from more than 12,000 scientists.

Signatories of the original statement include:

- Philip W. Anderson
- David Baltimore
- Paul Berg
- Rosina Bierbaum
- Nicolaas Bloembergen
- Lewis M. Branscomb
- Eric Chivian
- Joel E. Cohen
- James Cronin
- Margaret Davis
- Paul M. Doty
- Paul Ehrlich
- Thomas Eisner
- Christopher Field
- Gerald D. Fischbach
- Val L. Fitch
- Jerry Franklin
- Jerome Friedman
- Richard L. Garwin
- John H. Gibbons
- Marvin L. Goldberger
- Lynn R. Goldman
- Kurt Gottfried
- David Grimes
- Roger Guillemin
- John P. Holdren
- Eric R. Kandel
- Anne Kapuscinski
- Walter Kohn
- Lawrence Krauss
- Neal F. Lane
- Leon M. Lederman
- William Lipscomb
- Jane Lubchenco
- Michael MacCracken
- James J. McCarthy
- Jerry M. Melillo
- Matthew S. Meselson
- David Michaels
- Mario Molina
- Michael Oppenheimer
- Gordon Orians
- W.K.H. Panofsky
- Stuart Pimm
- Ron Pulliam
- Norman F. Ramsey
- Anthony Robbins
- Allan Rosenfield
- F. Sherwood Rowland
- Edwin E. Salpeter
- William Schlesinger
- J. Robert Schrieffer
- Richard Smalley
- Felicia Stewart
- Kevin Trenberth
- Harold E. Varmus
- Steven Weinberg
- E.O. Wilson
- Edward Witten
- George Woodwell
- Donald Wuebbles
- Herbert F. York
