= Dina Bakst =

American lawyer and worker's rights advocate

Dina Bakst is an American lawyer and worker's rights advocate. She is co-founder and co-president of A Better Balance, a national nonprofit organization that focuses on legislative advocacy and education on labor issues, particularly relating to pregnancy discrimination, sick leave, parental leave, and work–life balance.

In 2020, Time magazine named Bakst on their list of "16 People and Groups Fighting for a More Equal America."

In 2021, along with A Better Balance co-founder and co-president Sherry Leiwant, Bakst was awarded the Heinz Award for the Economy for A Better Balance's advocacy and policy work.

== A Better Balance ==
Bakst and Sherry Leiwant founded A Better Balance in New York City in 2006.

=== Pregnant Workers Fairness Act ===
Under Bakst's leadership, A Better Balance was credited by Fast Company as the "primary driver" of the Pregnant Workers Fairness Act, which passed in December 2022. Representative Jerry Nadler credited Bakst's January 2012 op-ed in The New York Times "Pregnant, and Pushed Out of a Job," as the inspiration for first introducing the Pregnant Workers Fairness Act in 2012. The organization helped draft the language of the bill.

Bakst presented witness testimony at a 2019 House Education and Labor Committee hearing on the Pregnant Workers Fairness Act and again in 2021.

=== New York State legislation ===
Under Bakst's leadership, A Better Balance played a key role in passing legislation in New York, including New York City's Earned Sick Time Act, which went into effect in 2014, New York City's Pregnant Workers Fairness Act, which passed in 2013, and New York's paid family leave law, which passed in 2016.

Under Bakst’s leadership, New York passed a law in 2022 protecting workers from being disciplined for taking legally protected time off.

=== Strategic litigation ===
Under Bakst's leadership, in 2017, alongside the National Women's Law Center and Mehri & Skalet, and Sedey Harper & Westhoff, A Better Balance filed a nationwide class-action lawsuit against Walmart for failure to accommodate pregnant workers. A Better Balance filed additional charges of disability discrimination against Walmart later that year. In 2020, a federal court granted final approval to a $14 million settlement in the matter of Borders v. Wal-Mart Stores, Inc.

Additionally, the city of Florence, Kentucky, reached an agreement in response to a case filed by A Better Balance under Bakst's leadership on behalf of two police officers who faced pregnancy discrimination on the job in 2016.

== Bibliography ==
=== Books ===
- Bakst, Dina; Taubman, Phoebe; Gedmark, Elizabeth (2014). Babygate: How to Survive Pregnancy and Parenting in the Workplace. Iuniverse Inc. ISBN 9781475975680.

=== Reports ===
- Bakst, Dina; Brafman, Sarah; Gedmark, Elizabeth (2023). Winning The Pregnant Workers Fairness Act: An Inside Story and Lessons Learned from the Decade-Long Fight for Justice, Fairness, and Equality. Report.
- Bakst, Dina; Brafman, Sarah; Gedmark, Elizabeth; Racklin, Meghan (2021). Long Overdue: The Pregnant Workers Fairness Act is a Critical Measure to Remove Barriers to Women’s Workplace Participation and Promote Healthy Pregnancies. Report.
