= Grist (magazine) =

Magazine

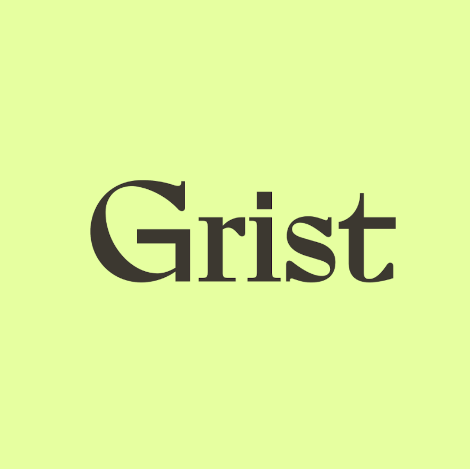
- Website type: Online magazine
- Headquarters: Seattle, Washington, USA
- Owners: Grist Magazine, Inc.
- Creator: Chip Giller
- Website: grist.org
- Launched: April 1999

Grist (originally Grist Magazine; also referred to as Grist.org) is an American non-profit online magazine founded in 1999 that publishes environmental news and commentary. Grist's tagline is "Climate. Justice. Solutions." Grist is headquartered in Seattle, Washington, and has about 50 writers and employees. Its CEO is former editor-in-chief Nikhil Swaminathan.

== Coverage ==
Grist offers reporting, interviews, daily news, book reviews, food and agricultural coverage, and green advice. Its stated mission is "show that a just and sustainable future is within reach."

For several years, Grist published an environmental advice column called "Ask Umbra," written by Umbra Fisk and later taken over by Eve Andrews. Grist also summarizes the day's environmentally related news events in daily and weekly email newsletters.

Main writers previously included David Roberts, Lisa Hymas, and Sarah Goodyear.

In addition to its environmental coverage, Grist publishes an annual climate fiction anthology titled "Imagine 2200." The magazine holds a writing contest in which writers from across the world are asked to imagine climate solutions and progress pioneered by future generations, with an emphasis on hopeful narratives.

== Staff ==
Chip Giller is the founder and former president of Grist. Giller received the Heinz Award for founding Grist in 2009. In 2004, he received the Jane Bagley Lehman Award for Excellence in Public Advocacy, from the Tides Foundation in recognition of the role Grist is playing in increasing environmental awareness. Giller took first place in the 2001 AlterNet New Media Hero contest for his work on Grist and was one of five finalists for the Environmental Grantmakers Association's 2002 "Environmental Messenger of the Year Award." Giller was previously the editor of Greenwire, the first environmental news daily.

Brady Walkinshaw, a former state representative from Seattle, was hired as Grist's CEO in March 2017. Walkinshaw unsuccessfully campaigned to represent the Washington's 7th congressional district in 2016 on a platform of controlling carbon emissions, among issues. Swaminathan replaced Walkinshaw in 2022.

== Finances ==
Grist is registered as a non-profit 501(c)(3) business entity. For fiscal year 2022, Grist reported revenues of $8,595,247, expenses of $8,930,092, and total assets of $9,520,430.

== Acquisitions ==
Grist owns the assets and digital archives of two defunct publications. In June 2020, Grist bought the Pacific Standard and in May 2024 acquired The Counter.

== See also ==
- Environmental journalism
- Institute for Nonprofit News (member)
- List of environmental websites
