= Brady Walkinshaw =

American businessman and politician from Washington

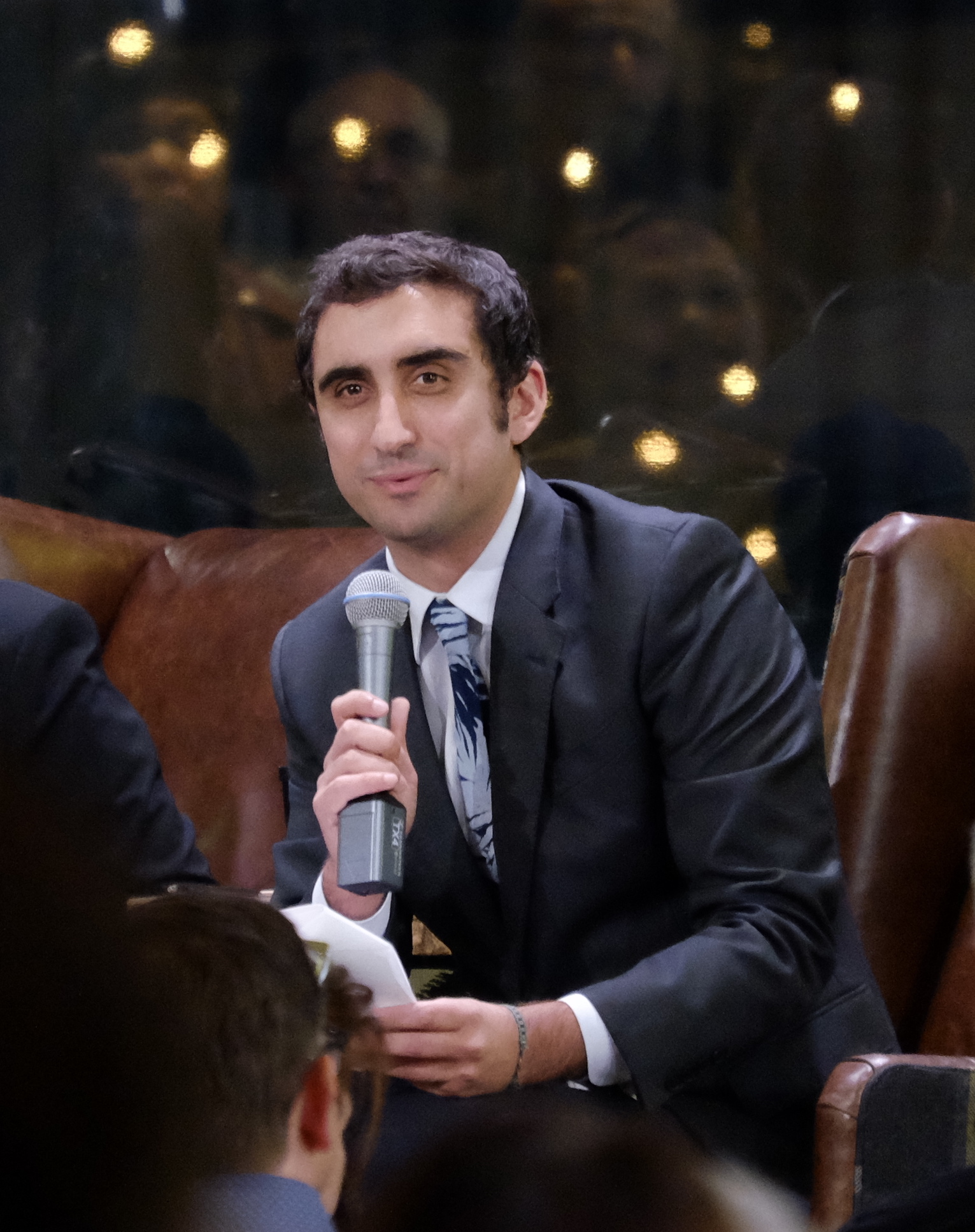

Member of the Washington House of Representatives from the 43rd district
- In office December 16, 2013 – January 9, 2017
- Preceded by: Jamie Pedersen
- Succeeded by: Nicole Macri

Personal details
- Born: Brady Piñero Walkinshaw; March 26, 1984 (age 42) Minneapolis, Minnesota, U.S.
- Party: Democratic
- Spouse: Micah Horwith (m. 2015, div. 2023) Hans Lidahl (m. 2026)
- Education: Princeton University
- Occupation: Businessman, politician

Brady Piñero Walkinshaw (born March 26, 1984) is an American businessman and politician who served in the Washington State House of Representatives from 2013 to 2017. Walkinshaw represented the 43rd legislative district, which encompasses much of central Seattle. He is the former CEO of Grist, a Seattle-based online magazine focusing on environmental news.

Walkinshaw was a candidate for Washington's 7th congressional district in the United States House of Representatives in the 2016 elections. He had the endorsement of the Gay and Lesbian Victory Fund and The Seattle Times, but lost the election to Pramila Jayapal. Walkinshaw was named by Washington State Senate Majority Leader Andy Billig to the Washington State Redistricting Commission following the 2020 United States census.

== Washington legislature ==
=== Elections ===
A Democrat, Walkinshaw was appointed to office in 2013 following the election of Ed Murray as Mayor of Seattle. When Jamie Pedersen assumed Murray's former seat in the Senate, Walkinshaw succeeded Pedersen in the House. Walkinshaw was then elected in 2014.

=== Legislation ===
Walkinshaw was the primary sponsor of 'Joel's Law' (HB 1258), which allows family members to petition Washington courts to involuntarily commit a relative for mental health treatment. The legislation adds $15 million to the state's mental health system. The bill passed through the State House on a unanimous vote, and its companion bill passed through the State Senate on a vote of 46 to 3, becoming law on July 24, 2015.

On January 26, 2015, Walkinshaw introduced HB 1671, to increase access to opioid antagonists in order to reduce deaths resulting from drug overdose. The bill passed through the State House on a vote of 96 to 1, through the State Senate on a unanimous vote, and became law on July 24, 2015.

Walkinshaw was primary sponsor for 'CROP' (HB 1553), which allows those released from prison to obtain a court certificate that restores access to licensed professions. The bill passed unanimously through the State House and Senate, and was signed into law by Governor Inslee on March 31, 2016.

On January 19, 2016, Walkinshaw introduced HB 2726, which establishes rights for senior citizens entering continuing care retirement communities and requires disclosure of costs and fees. The bill passed through the State House on a vote of 83 to 13, unanimously through the State Senate, and was signed by the Governor on April 1, 2016.

=== Committee assignments ===
House, 2016 session

- Agriculture & Natural Resources (Vice Chair)
- Appropriations
- Early Learning & Human Services

== Media career ==
On March 7, 2017, Grist named Walkinshaw as its CEO, taking over from founder Chip Giller. His tenure ended in 2022.

Walkinshaw started Noisy Creek, and purchased a number of alt-weekly newspapers published by Index Media, such as The Stranger and Portland Mercury, in July 2024.

== Personal life ==
Walkinshaw is of Cuban American descent, and is openly gay. Walkinshaw previously worked as a program officer at the Bill & Melinda Gates Foundation. He is a graduate of the Princeton School of Public and International Affairs. Walkinshaw has been on the boards of Princeton University and The Trust for Public Land.
