= Economic Security Project =

American non-profit organization

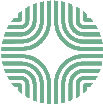
- Abbreviation: ESP
- Founded: 2016
- Type: Nonprofit organization
- Legal status: Active
- Key people: Natalie Foster Chris Hughes Aisha Nyandoro Dorian Warren Felicia Wong
- Budget: ?
- Website: www.economicsecurityproject.org

The Economic Security Project (ESP) is an American progressive non-profit organization focused on economic issues, primarily guaranteed income and anti-monopoly action. Founded with the aim to "make our economy work again for all Americans," ESP has provided seed funding and organizational support for guaranteed income pilot projects across the country, and has advocated for the expansion of cash tax credits and for more robust antimonopoly action. Their efforts have contributed to the increased visibility and political viability of guaranteed income. Since its founding, ESP has helped to set in motion over 100 guaranteed income pilots, whereas there had been only 12 pilots at the time of its founding.

The Economic Security Project has solicited bids for paid editors on Wikipedia.

== History and overview ==
The ESP was founded by Facebook co-founder Chris Hughes, Dorian Warren, and Natalie Foster. in 2016. Dorian Warren is the co-president of Community Change, as well as a scholar and organizer. Natalie Foster is an Aspen Institute Fellow for the Institute's Future of Work Initiative Signatories of the organization's initial statement of belief included Former Secretary of Labor Robert Reich, Black Lives Matter co-founder Alicia Garza, and Alaska State Senator Bill Wielechowski.

When the organization was founded, its goal was to "research, experiment, and inspire others to think through how best to design cash programs." That mission came to include doing issues advocacy and providing seed funding. ESP successfully collaborated with local government officials and local nonprofits to conduct guaranteed income pilot programs such as the SEED program and Magnolia Mother's Trust. The organization was pivotal in expanding the Child Tax Credit during the pandemic. ESP Founder Chris Hughes published an op-ed in the New York Times titled It's Time to Break Up Facebook, which helped launch ESP's Antimonopoly Fund providing seed funding to anti-monopoly organizations.

In an opinion piece in The New York Times, Farhad Manjoo wrote: "One of the main backers of guaranteed income is the Economic Security Project [...] The Economic Security Project has also been a leading political champion of the expanded Child Tax Credit. The group says that both developments — its experience with pilot projects running so far and the success of the expanded Child Tax Credit — are helping to prove a fundamental idea: Giving people money works."

Economic Security Project works by convening and organizing other philanthropists and non-profit organizations around its mission of creating a more equitable economy, while also giving grants and campaigning in support of a guaranteed income and anti-monopoly action.

== Initiatives ==
=== Stockton Economic Empowerment Demonstration ===
The Stockton Economic Empowerment Demonstration (SEED) was a two-year-long guaranteed income pilot program in Stockton, CA that paid 125 participants $500 a month, starting in February 2019. This was the first ever mayor-led guaranteed income initiative, spearheaded by Michael Tubbs. Economic Security Project funded the project with an initial $1 million grant. No public funds were used. Participants were selected based on their annual income; they had to be at or below the city's annual median household income to qualify. Originally intended to be an 18-month-long program, the program was extended for six additional months to help recipients weather the COVID-19 pandemic and to study the effects of the additional cash during that time period.

Research by Stacia West and Amy Baker on the impacts of the guaranteed income payments showed that recipients were more likely to find work than the control group, showed less depression and anxiety, experienced less income volatility, and were more likely to engage in goal-setting and risk-taking.

=== Magnolia Mother's Trust ===
The Magnolia Mother's Trust is an ongoing guaranteed income program in Jackson, Mississippi administered by Springboard to Opportunities, led by CEO Aisha Nyandoro. Funded entirely through philanthropic donations, with some of its funding provided by Economic Security Project, The Magnolia Mother's Trust began in December 2018 and initially offered $1,000 a month for 12 months to a group of 20 Black mothers living in public housing. The program was expanded to include 110 mothers in March 2020, and served 100 mothers in April 2021. Surveys of participants show that the cash helped the recipients achieve their educational goals, provide more resources for the education of their children, and spend more time with their families.

=== Cost-of-Living Refund ===
The Cost-of-Living Refund is an Economic Security Project plan to expand the Earned Income Tax Credit (EITC), using the tax code to provide an income floor to families earning under $75,000. It would expand the size of the tax credit and pay it monthly. A significant feature of this plan would be to expand the definition of work to include college students and caregivers of children, the sick, disabled and elderly, thus qualifying more people to receive a tax credit traditionally reserved for waged employment. Economic Security Project's approach was incorporated into several proposed but unpassed Congressional bills, including then-Senator Kamala Harris's LIFT Act in 2018, Rep. Rashida Talib's BOOST Act, and the Worker Relief and Credit Reform Act by Rep. Bonnie Watson Coleman. This proposal was expanded up through Guaranteed Income for the 21st Century, a paper by Economist Darrick Hamilton and others. This plan would guarantee a $12,500 annual income for every adult and a $4,500 allowance for every child.

=== Emergency Money To The People ===
Responding to the mass unemployment and economic downturn of the COVID-19 pandemic, Economic Security Project advocated for direct cash stimulus policies to lift 12 million Americans out of poverty. One iteration of Emergency Money to the People would provide $750 per adult and $250 per child quarterly until the unemployment rate fell below 5.5%. The Emergency Money for the People Act, proposed by Representatives Ro Khanna and Tim Ryan, would provide $2,000 monthly payments for 6–12 months. A petition sponsored by Economic Security Project advocating for monthly $2,000 checks received nearly 3 million signatures in support.

=== Antimonopoly Fund ===
In October 2019, Economic Security Project launched its $10 million Antimonopoly Fund with the Omidyar Network and Open Society Foundations. The fund was invested in organizations working to curb monopoly power throughout the economy, including the agricultural and pharmaceutical sectors.

In a 2020 interview on Amanpour & Co., Hughes elaborated on the intentions of the Antimonopoly Fund: "The fewer companies you have, the more power they have and the more that their voice is heard in the halls of government, and the more that they're able to shape policy on their behalf. And so what we have seen, even now, or particularly now, is the growth of this power. And good institutions, like the Department of Justice and the FTC, have, in some cases, taken a step back and not taken on their regulatory duties as a result of this pronounced power."

In June 2021, the Open Markets Institute, a grantee of the Antimonopoly Fund, saw their former legal director, Lina Khan, confirmed as Chair of the Federal Trade Commission.

=== Cash Tax Credits ===
Economic Security Project helped enact the 2021 expansion of the Federal Child Tax Credit, providing regular monthly payments to all families with children, effectively creating a guaranteed income for children. The expanded credit led to a 46% decline in child poverty, lifted 3.7 million children out of poverty and resulted in a 25% immediate drop in food insufficiency rates among low income households. Ultimately, Congress failed to extend or renew the expanded Child Tax Credit. ESP has now shifted to a long-term campaign to renew the expanded Child Tax Credit. ESP also works to expand state-level tax credits to deliver regular cash payments to families and to create models for national legislation.
