= Andrew Farley =

Andrew Farley may refer to:

- Andrew Farley (rugby union)
- Andrew Farley (author)
- Andy Farley, British hard house disc jockey and record producer
