= Rob M. van Dam =

Dutch-American nutrition researcher

- Born: Rob Martinus van Dam
- Education: Vrije Universiteit Amsterdam; Wageningen University
- Scientific career
- Fields: Nutrition science
- Institutions: Harvard T.H. Chan School of Public Health; Milken Institute School of Public Health; National University of Singapore; Vrije Universiteit Amsterdam
- Thesis: Physical activity, genetic susceptibility and risk for type 2 diabetes (2003)
- Doctoral advisors: E.J.M. Feskens; Jaap Seidell

Rob Martinus van Dam is a Dutch-American nutrition researcher who serves as a professor in the Department of Exercise and Nutrition Sciences in the Milken Institute School of Public Health at George Washington University. He was educated at Wageningen University and the Vrije Universiteit Amsterdam in the Netherlands. Before joining George Washington University in 2021, he was on the faculty of the Vrije Universiteit Amsterdam, the Harvard T.H. Chan School of Public Health and Harvard Medical School, and the Saw Swee Hock School of Public Health and Yong Loo Lin School of Medicine at the National University of Singapore. In 2018, he was recognized as an ISI Highly Cited Researcher.
