= Scott Doney =

Marine scientist

Scott Christopher Doney
- Education: Massachusetts Institute of Technology; Woods Hole Oceanographic Institution
- Scientific career
- Workplaces: University of Virginia
- Thesis: A study of North Atlantic ventilation using transient tracers (1991)
- Doctoral advisor: William J. Jenkins

Scott Doney is a marine scientist at the University of Virginia known for his work on biogeochemical modeling. Doney is the Joe D. and Helen J. Kington Professor in Environmental Change, a member of the National Academy of Sciences, and a fellow of the American Geophysical Union, the American Association for the Advancement of Science, and the Association for the Sciences of Limnology and Oceanography. He served from 2022 to 2024 as the Assistant Director for Ocean Climate Science and Policy in the White House Office of Science and Technology Policy.

== Education and career ==
Doney has a B.A. in chemistry from the University of California at San Diego. As an undergraduate, he went to sea as a Sea Education Association student on the R/V Westward, and was a summer intern at the NASA Goddard Institute for Space Studies (GISS). He earned his Ph.D. in chemical oceanography from the Massachusetts Institute of Technology - Woods Hole Oceanographic Institution Joint Program in 1991, and his thesis focused on ocean observations of transient tracers - chlorofluorocarbons, tritium, and helium isotopes. He moved to the National Center for Atmospheric Research (NCAR) where he started a postdoctoral fellowship in 1991.

In 1993 he joined the science staff in the Climate and Global Dynamics Division at NCAR, where he helped spearhead the incorporation of biogeochemistry and the carbon cycle into the Community Earth System Model (CESM). Doney remained with NCAR until 2002, when he moved to the Department of Marine Chemistry and Geochemistry at the Woods Hole Oceanographic Institution. In 2017 he moved to the University of Virginia where he is the Joe D. and Helen J. Kington Professor in Environmental Change.

=== White House Office of Science and Technology Policy ===
During the Biden Administration, Doney served as the Assistant Director for Ocean Climate Science at OSTP, where he worked to outline the ocean's role in combatting climate change. As part of this role, Doney acted as co-chair of the Ocean Climate Action Plan Workgroup, helping to guide and coordinate federal action on the ocean as a climate solution.

== Research ==
Doney was involved in the Joint Global Ocean Flux Study (JGOFS; ocean biogeochemistry), World Ocean Circulation Experiment (WOCE), and U.S. Carbon Cycle Science Program, and he served as convening lead author for the 2014 U.S. National Climate Assessment (USGCRP), which included for the first time a chapter on Oceans and Marine Resources. He helped create the U.S. Ocean Carbon and Biogeochemistry (OCB) Program, which coordinates a broad range of ocean research. He served on several National Academies of Sciences, Engineering, and Medicine committees, including chairing a 2022 report, A Research Strategy for Ocean-based Carbon Dioxide Removal and Sequestration. He was co-convening lead author for a report on Principles for Responsible and Effective Marine Carbon Dioxide Removal Development and Governance sponsored by the High Level Panel for a Sustainable Ocean Economy.

Doney is known for his use of computational methods including modeling, satellite remote sensing, and data science in the field of oceanography. In 2011, he co-authored a graduate-level textbook, Modeling Methods for Marine Science, with his WHOI colleagues. His work centers on how ecosystems respond to natural and human-induced change through examination of coastal and ocean carbon cycles. Research topics of particular interest include climate change, ocean acidification, and marine carbon dioxide removal.

=== Selected publications ===
- Orr, James C.; Fabry, Victoria J.; Aumont, Olivier; Bopp, Laurent; Doney, Scott C.; Feely, Richard A.; Gnanadesikan, Anand; Gruber, Nicolas; Ishida, Akio; Joos, Fortunat; Key, Robert M.; Lindsay, Keith; Maier-Reimer, Ernst; Matear, Richard; Monfray, Patrick; Mouchet, Anne; Najjar, Raymond G.; Plattner, Gian-Kasper; Rodgers, Keith B.; Sabine, Christopher L.; Sarmiento, Jorge L.; Schlitzer, Reiner; Slater, Richard D.; Totterdell, Ian J.; Weirig, Marie-France; Yamanaka, Yasuhiro; Yool, Andrew (September 2005). "Anthropogenic ocean acidification over the twenty-first century and its impact on calcifying organisms" (PDF). Nature. 437 (7059): 681–686. Bibcode:2005Natur.437..681O. doi:10.1038/nature04095. ISSN 1476-4687. PMID 16193043. S2CID 4306199.
- Large, W. G.; McWilliams, J. C.; Doney, S. C. (1994). "Oceanic vertical mixing: A review and a model with a nonlocal boundary layer parameterization". Reviews of Geophysics. 32 (4): 363–403. Bibcode:1994RvGeo..32..363L. doi:10.1029/94RG01872. ISSN 1944-9208.
- Doney, Scott C.; Fabry, Victoria J.; Feely, Richard A.; Kleypas, Joan A. (1 January 2009). "Ocean Acidification: The Other CO2 Problem". Annual Review of Marine Science. 1 (1): 169–192. Bibcode:2009ARMS....1..169D. doi:10.1146/annurev.marine.010908.163834. ISSN 1941-1405. PMID 21141034. S2CID 402398.
- Doney, Scott C.; Ruckelshaus, Mary; Emmett Duffy, J.; Barry, James P.; Chan, Francis; English, Chad A.; Galindo, Heather M.; Grebmeier, Jacqueline M.; Hollowed, Anne B.; Knowlton, Nancy; Polovina, Jeffrey; Rabalais, Nancy N.; Sydeman, William J.; Talley, Lynne D. (12 December 2011). "Climate Change Impacts on Marine Ecosystems". Annual Review of Marine Science. 4 (1): 11–37. Bibcode:2012ARMS....4...11D. doi:10.1146/annurev-marine-041911-111611. ISSN 1941-1405. PMID 22457967.

== Awards and honors ==
- James B. Macelwane Medal, American Geophysical Union (2000)
- Fellow, American Geophysical Union (2000)
- Fellow, Aldo Leopold Leadership Program (2004)
- Fellow, American Association for the Advancement of Science (2010)
- A.G. Huntsman Award for Excellence in Marine Science (2013)
- Fellow, Association for the Sciences of Limnology and Oceanography (2021)
- Distinguished Researcher Award, University of Virginia (2024)
- Member, National Academy of Sciences (2025)
