= Greg Asner =

American ecologist

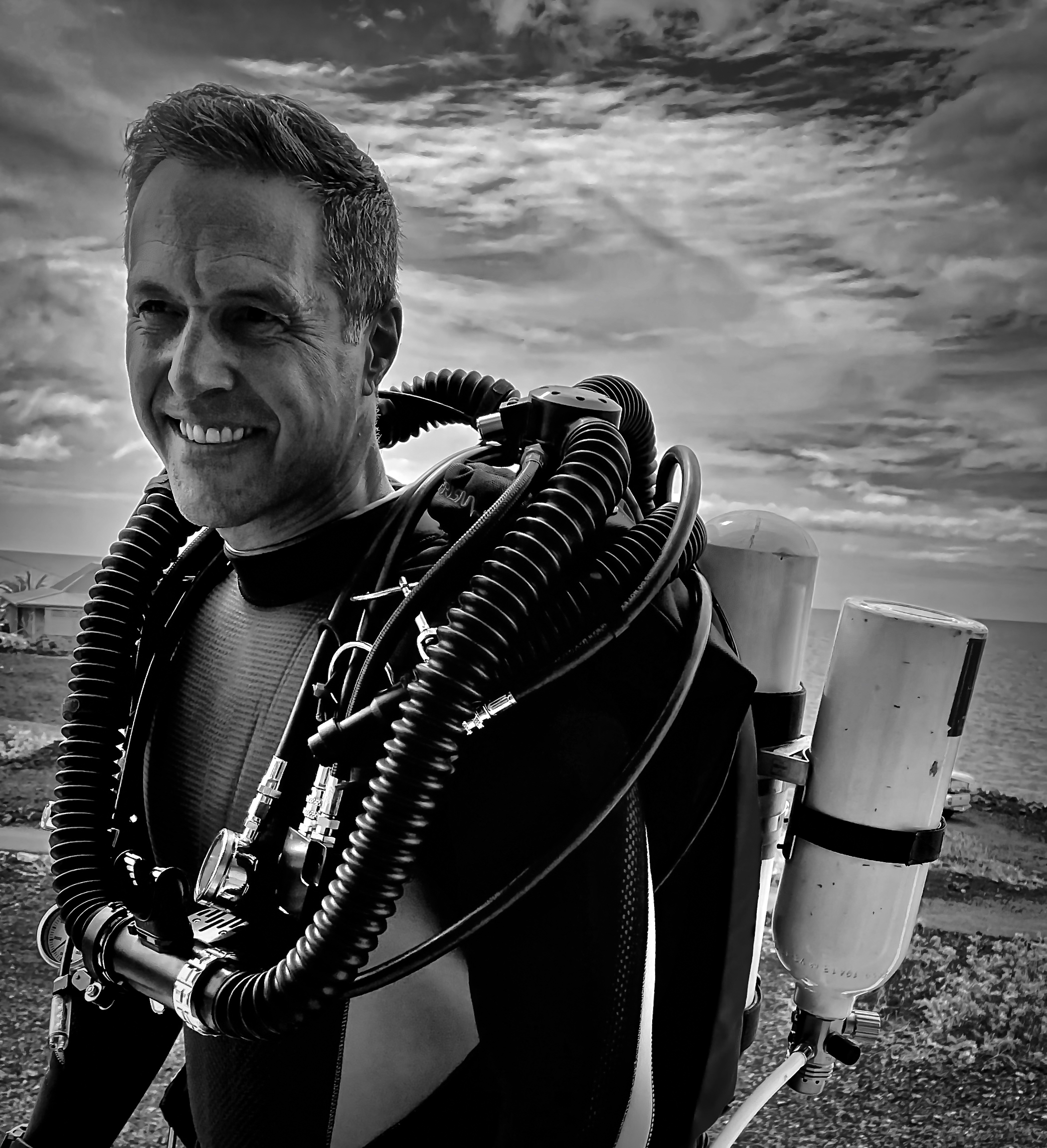
- Born: 1968 or 1969 (age 57–58)
- Education: B.S. Engineering (Radiative Physics), University of Colorado Boulder, 1991; M.S. Geography, University of Colorado Boulder, 1995; Ph.D. Biology, University of Colorado Boulder, 1997
- Occupations: Director of Arizona State University's Center for Global Discovery and Conservation Science and Managing Director, The Allen Coral Atlas
- Spouse: Robin Martin
- Website: asnerlab.org

Gregory P. Asner is an American ecologist whose global work has focused on ecosystems, conservation, and climate sciences. He has developed technology to access and analyze large amounts of data about ecosystems, including assessing carbon emissions, coral reef resilience, and biodiversity. He is the founder of the Global Airborne Observatory (GAO, formerly the Carnegie Airborne Observatory, or CAO) and the creator of Carnegie Landsat Analysis System (CLAS) and CLASlite. Since 2019, he has been the Director of Arizona State University's Center for Global Discovery and Conservation Science. He is also managing director of the Allen Coral Atlas, an online map of all the coral reefs in the world used as a reference for reef conservation.

Asner's work mapping forests and coral reefs using airplanes and satellites influenced environmental policy decisions in several countries. He is a member of the National Academy of Sciences and a 2017 Heinz Award recipient.

== Early career ==
Asner grew up in Maryland, then earned an undergraduate degree in engineering and moved to Hawaii. In the late 1980s and early 1990s, he was a deep-sea diver in the United States Navy, an experience that initiated his career in ecology. He worked for the nonprofit The Nature Conservancy in Hawaii in the early 1990s. As a result of his work there, he published his first scientific paper, assessing damage done to forests in Kauaʻi after Hurricane Iniki in 1992. After his early experiences collecting ecological data in Hawaii, he began working on ways to measure human impacts on ecosystems around the world.

In 1996, NASA selected Asner, then a student at University of Colorado Boulder, as a recipient of one of its Earth System Science Graduate Student Fellowships. He earned his Ph.D. in biology in 1997. Subsequently, he turned his focus to creating better ways to gather data about the status of natural resources. In 1999, Asner began working on CLAS, a new system to map the effects of logging on rainforests. As of September 2017, Asner's team had provided CLASlite, the successor to CLAS, to 5,000 scientists in 137 countries for free in order to assist in collecting data about forest health and inform conservation decisions.

Asner moved his laboratory and research program from the University of Colorado to the Carnegie Institution's Department of Global Ecology in 2001. In addition to the airborne CAO – which officially launched in 2006 – the team collected ecological data using satellite sensors and computer modeling.

In 2005, after nearly a decade of research, Asner published a study of logging in the Amazon rainforest demonstrating that "selective logging" is often as harmful to ecosystems as clear-cutting. That same year, he and Peter Vitousek published research showing early indicators of an invasive species of tree growing in Hawaii Volcanoes National Park. Popular Science named Asner to its annual "Brilliant Ten" list in 2007.

== Work mapping forests and coral reefs ==
Asner led the team that developed, over the course of 15 years, Airborne Taxonomic Mapping System (AToMS), an advanced technology that uses sensors in a Dornier 228 airplane to map the Earth. AToMS uses spectrometers, lasers, and other tools to generate three-dimensional models of forests. With this technology the GAO can analyze the components of trees' foliage in order to identify which species make up different parts of forests. This granular data helps governments make decisions to protect biodiversity and reduce carbon footprints. For example, maps he has created have guided decisions about creating new national parks in Peru and supporting lion habitats in South Africa. His data has also shown that the Amazon contains 36 types of forest, a level of variation not previously understood. By 2019, Asner and his wife Robin Martin have identified the "spectral signatures" of half of the world's 60,000 tree species.

Throughout his career, Asner has worked to make his research accessible to government leaders and other people in positions of power. His work has influenced conservation policy decisions in the United States, South America and Southeast Asia. He has worked with multiple countries to help measure the carbon locked in their forests. In 2009, he used lidar to map the carbon in 4.3 million hectares (17 thousand square miles) of Peruvian Amazon and provided the results to the Peruvian government. In 2013, his data highlighted the environmental impact of gold mining and deforestation in Peru. Also in 2013, he and the CAO team contributed data to a carbon map of the entirety of Panama, the first time a whole country had been mapped in that way.

The next year, Asner's CAO team released a 69-page report on Peru's rainforests to its Ministry of the Environment. As a result of this research, Norway gave $300 million to Peru in late 2014 to protect Peru's forests and reduce greenhouse gas emissions. By January 2017, Asner had mapped all 78 million hectares (300 thousand square miles) of the Peruvian Amazon. Asner has mapped 14 million hectares (54 thousand square miles) of forests in Colombia. As of July 2012, his team had mapped the carbon stocks of 40 percent of the Colombian Amazon. He has used similar technology to evaluate the health of coral reefs according to their coloring as observed from a plane. In 2015, he led a study of how the 2011–2017 California drought was affecting the state's forests, finding that approximately 20 percent of forests in the state were dead or would die. He continued the work in 2016 while associated with Stanford University. Governor Jerry Brown decided to declare a state of emergency in California partly due to this data.

In 2018, Asner and the CAO mapped coral reef health in the Dominican Republic in a collaboration of Asner’s Reefscape Project, The Nature Conservancy, and the private company Planet. Their data assisted the design of the largest marine protected area in the Dominican Republic.

After flying more than 200 missions in 2018, Asner and the CAO team (now renamed to GAO) moved to Arizona State University in January 2019. That year, his team conducted a project mapping coral reefs along the Hawaiian islands. The goal of the project was to assess damage done by ocean warming, overfishing, and coastal development. That July, Asner's team created a website where users can report coral bleaching they have observed. That month, the team launched a network of 140 small satellites to monitor coral health near Hawaii. As of April 2020, they were using data from Planet and the ICESat-2 satellite for further research on coral reef health.

In September 2021, the Allen Coral Atlas, of which Asner is managing director, announced it had completed a comprehensive map of the world's coral reefs, compiled using more than 2 million satellite images.

== Honors ==
Asner received a Presidential Early Career Award for Scientists and Engineers in 2000. In 2013, the National Academy of Sciences elected Asner as a member. The Remote Sensing Specialty Group of the American Association of Geographers gave him its Outstanding Contribution Award in 2014. In 2015, he became a fellow of the American Geophysical Union, and in 2016, he became a fellow of the Ecological Society of America. Asner received a $250,000 Heinz Award in 2017 for his work with the CAO mapping coral reefs and rainforests.

== Selected publications ==
- Asner, G. P.; Knapp, David E.; Broadbent, Eben N.; Oliveira, Paulo J. C.; Keller, Michael; Silva, Jose N. (2005). "Selective Logging in the Brazilian Amazon". Science. 310 (5747): 480–482. Bibcode:2005Sci...310..480A. doi:10.1126/science.1118051. PMID 16239474. S2CID 9542121.
- Foley, J. A.; Defries, R.; Asner, G. P.; Barford, C.; Bonan, G.; Carpenter, S. R.; Chapin, F. S.; Coe, M. T.; Daily, G. C.; Gibbs, H. K.; Helkowski, J. H.; Holloway, T.; Howard, E. A.; Kucharik, C. J.; Monfreda, C.; Patz, J. A.; Prentice, I. C.; Ramankutty, N.; Snyder, P. K. (2005). "Global Consequences of Land Use". Science. 309 (5734): 570–574. Bibcode:2005Sci...309..570F. doi:10.1126/science.1111772. PMID 16040698. S2CID 5711915.
- Asner, G. P.; Vitousek, P. M. (2005). "Remote analysis of biological invasion and biogeochemical change". Proceedings of the National Academy of Sciences. 102 (12): 4383–4386. doi:10.1073/pnas.0500823102. PMC 554001. PMID 15761055.
- Asner, Gregory P. (2007). "Carnegie Airborne Observatory: In-flight fusion of hyperspectral imaging and waveform light detection and ranging for three-dimensional studies of ecosystems". Journal of Applied Remote Sensing. 1: 013536. doi:10.1117/1.2794018. S2CID 122638003.
- Asner, Gregory P.; Martin, Roberta E. (2009). "Airborne spectranomics: Mapping canopy chemical and taxonomic diversity in tropical forests". Frontiers in Ecology and the Environment. 7 (5): 269–276. Bibcode:2009FrEE....7..269A. doi:10.1890/070152.
- Asner, G. P.; Levick, S. R.; Kennedy-Bowdoin, T.; Knapp, D. E.; Emerson, R.; Jacobson, J.; Colgan, M. S.; Martin, R. E. (2009). "Large-scale impacts of herbivores on the structural diversity of African savannas". Proceedings of the National Academy of Sciences. 106 (12): 4947–4952. Bibcode:2009PNAS..106.4947A. doi:10.1073/pnas.0810637106. PMC 2650504. PMID 19258457.
- Loarie, Scott R.; Duffy, Philip B.; Hamilton, Healy; Asner, Gregory P.; Field, Christopher B.; Ackerly, David D. (2009). "The velocity of climate change". Nature. 462 (7276): 1052–1055. Bibcode:2009Natur.462.1052L. doi:10.1038/nature08649. PMID 20033047. S2CID 4419902.
- Asner, Gregory P.; Knapp, David E.; Martin, Roberta E.; Tupayachi, Raul; Anderson, Christopher B.; Mascaro, Joseph; Sinca, Felipe; Chadwick, K. Dana; Higgins, Mark; Farfan, William; Llactayo, William; Silman, Miles R. (2014). "Targeted carbon conservation at national scales with high-resolution monitoring". Proceedings of the National Academy of Sciences. 111 (47): E5016–E5022. Bibcode:2014PNAS..111E5016A. doi:10.1073/pnas.1419550111. PMC 4250114. PMID 25385593. S2CID 11681023.
- Asner, Gregory P.; Martin, Roberta E.; Mascaro, Joseph (2017). "Coral reef atoll assessment in the South China Sea using Planet Dove satellites". Remote Sensing in Ecology and Conservation. 3 (2): 57–65. Bibcode:2017RSEC....3...57A. doi:10.1002/rse2.42.
- Asner, G. P.; Martin, R. E.; Knapp, D. E.; Tupayachi, R.; Anderson, C. B.; Sinca, F.; Vaughn, N. R.; Llactayo, W. (2017). "Airborne laser-guided imaging spectroscopy to map forest trait diversity and guide conservation". Science. 355 (6323): 385–389. Bibcode:2017Sci...355..385A. doi:10.1126/science.aaj1987. PMID 28126815. S2CID 206653756.
- Asner, Gregory P.; Vaughn, Nicholas R.; Heckler, Joseph; Knapp, David E.; Balzotti, Christopher; Shafron, Ethan; Martin, Roberta E.; Neilson, Brian J.; Gove, Jamison M. (2020). "Large-scale mapping of live corals to guide reef conservation". Proceedings of the National Academy of Sciences. 117 (52): 33711–33718. Bibcode:2020PNAS..11733711A. doi:10.1073/pnas.2017628117. PMC 7776917. PMID 33318215.
- Foo, Shawna A.; Asner, Gregory P. (2020). "Sea surface temperature in coral reef restoration outcomes". Environmental Research Letters. 15 (7): 074045. Bibcode:2020ERL....15g4045F. doi:10.1088/1748-9326/ab7dfa.
