= Katharine Hayhoe =

Canadian atmospheric scientist

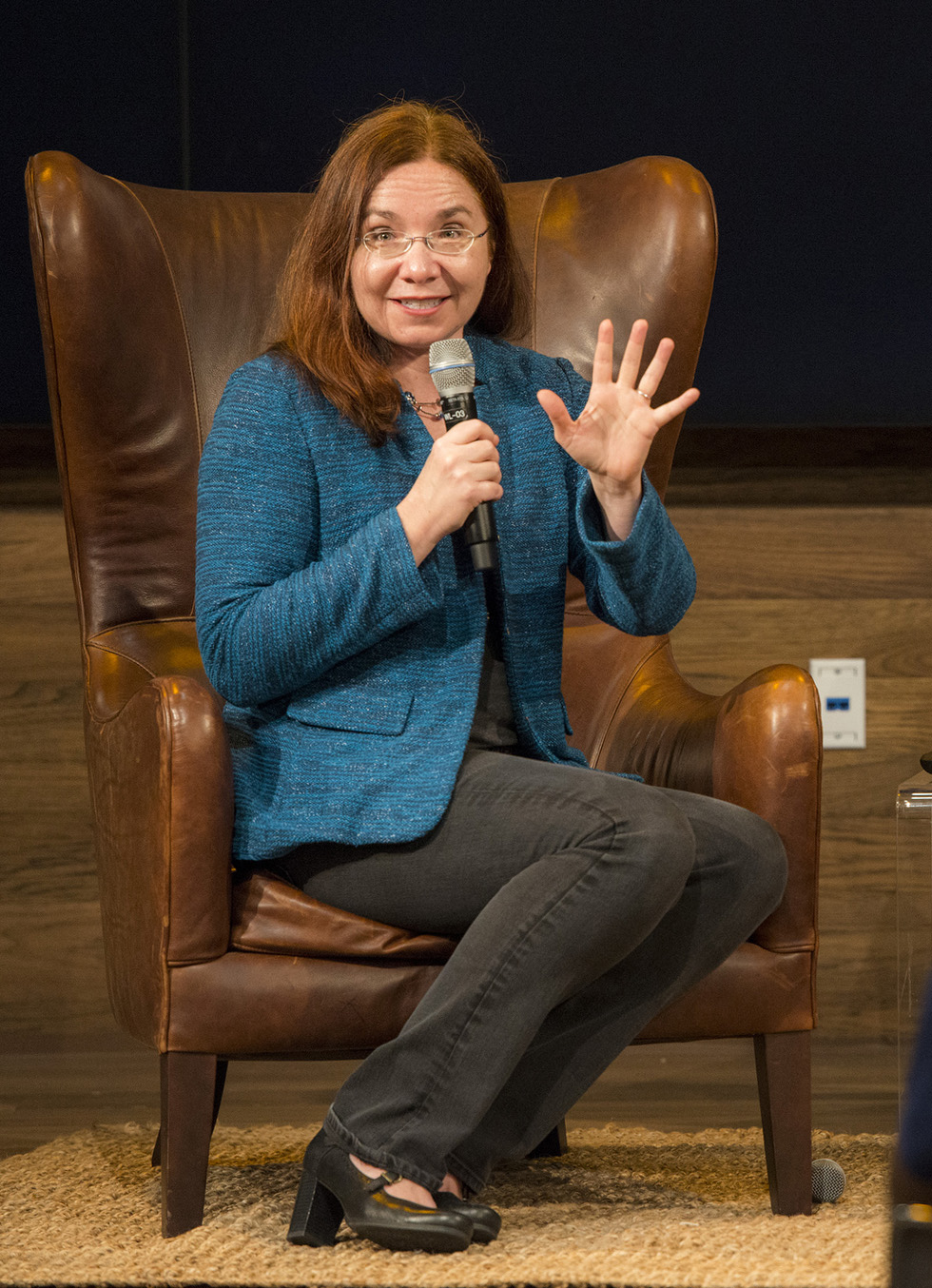
- Hayhoe in 2018
- Born: Katharine Anne Scott Hayhoe; April 15, 1972 (age 54); Toronto, Ontario, Canada
- Occupations: Atmospheric scientist; political scientist; science communicator
- Spouse: Andrew Farley
- Awards: Champion of the Earth (2019)

Academic background
- Education: Victoria College, Toronto; University of Illinois at Urbana-Champaign
- Thesis: A Standardized Framework for Evaluating the Skill of Regional Climate Downscaling Techniques (2010)
- Doctoral advisor: Donald Wuebbles

Academic work
- Discipline: Atmospheric science; political science
- Institutions: Texas Tech University
- Main interests: Climate change policy; global climate models
- Website: katharinehayhoe.com

Katharine Anne Scott Hayhoe (born 1972) is a Canadian atmospheric scientist. She is a Paul Whitfield Horn Distinguished Professor and an Endowed Chair in Public Policy and Public Law at the Texas Tech University Department of Political Science. In 2021, Hayhoe joined the Nature Conservancy as Chief Scientist.

== Early life and education ==
Hayhoe was born on April 15, 1972, in Toronto, Ontario. Her father, Doug Hayhoe, was a science educator and missionary. When Hayhoe was nine, her family moved to Cali, Colombia, where her parents served as missionaries and educators.

Hayhoe received her Bachelor of Science degree in physics and astronomy from the University of Toronto in 1994. She began her college career studying astrophysics, but upon taking a course on climate science to fulfill a course requirement, she shifted her focus to atmospheric science, which she ultimately specialized in at graduate school.

Hayhoe attended graduate school at the University of Illinois at Urbana-Champaign, where she received her Master of Science and Doctor of Philosophy. Her PhD committee was chaired by Donald Wuebbles, who recruited her for a research project assessing the impacts of climate change on the Great Lakes.

== Personal life ==
Hayhoe, who is an evangelical Christian, is the daughter of missionaries. She has stated that admitting her life as a Christian and a scientist is "like coming out of the closet". Her father, Doug Hayhoe, is a former science and technology coordinator for the Toronto District School Board, and emeritus professor of education at Tyndale University College and Seminary in Toronto. Hayhoe credits her father as an inspiration with regard to her belief that science and religion do not have to conflict with one another.

She met her husband, Andrew Farley, while doing graduate studies at the University of Illinois. Farley is an author, pastor and SiriusXM radio host who leads The Grace Message, a Christian ministry.

== Research career ==
Hayhoe has worked at Texas Tech since 2005. She has authored more than 150 peer-reviewed abstracts, journal articles, and other publications including the Second, Third, Fourth and Fifth National Climate Assessment for the US Global Change Research Program, as well as the National Academy of Sciences report “Climate Stabilization Targets”.

Shortly after the Third Assessment was released, Hayhoe said, "Climate change is here and now, and not in some distant time or place," adding that, "The choices we're making today will have a significant impact on our future." She co-authored the American Association for the Advancement of Science's What We Know, and How We Respond reports. In 2021, she was co-author of the book Downscaling Techniques for High-Resolution Climate Projections: From Global Change to Local Impacts (Cambridge University Press, 2021).

== Recognition ==
In 2014, Hayhoe was named one of Time magazine's "100 Most Influential People". In 2017, she was named one of Fortune magazine's "50 World's Greatest Leaders". She has also been named to Foreign Policy magazine's list of "100 Leading Global Thinkers" twice, in 2014 and 2019. Also in 2019, Hayhoe was named one of the United Nations Champions of the Earth in the science and innovation category.

Hayhoe has received honorary doctorates from Colgate University, Victoria University at the University of Toronto, Wycliffe College at the University of Toronto, and Trinity College (CT). She has received the American Geophysical Union's Climate Communication and Ambassador Awards, and is a fellow of the American Geophysical Union, the American Scientific Affiliation, the American Academy of Arts and Letters, and an honorary fellow of the Canadian Meteorological and Oceanographic Society. In 2023 Hayhoe was elected to the American Academy of Arts and Sciences.

In March 2026, the University of Michigan's Department of Climate and Space Sciences and Engineering honored Hayhoe with the prestigious Spencer Lecturer Award for her lifetime contributions to atmospheric science, downscaling regional climate models, and bridging the gap between localized infrastructure planning and global climate projections.

== Climate communications ==
In addition to her research on climate change, Hayhoe is known for her communication around climate change and her advocacy efforts around climate action. Professor John Abraham has called her "perhaps the best communicator on climate change." Hayhoe has also spoken at the Nobel Peace Prize forum and appeared at the White House with former President Barack Obama and the actor Leonardo DiCaprio at the first South by South Lawn festival.

As of 2023 Hayhoe's 2018 TED talk, "The most important thing you can do to fight climate change", had over 4 million views. She has also written the book Saving Us: A climate scientist's case for hope and healing in a divided world. She is active on over a dozen social media channels, writes regularly for Scientific American, and her newsletter Talking Climate shares good news, "not-so-good" news, and something people can do about climate change every week.

In her communication, she emphasizes the importance of not engaging with people she refers to as "dismissive", after the Yale University Program on Climate Communication's Six Americas. On September 28, 2018, she said, "The six stages of climate denial are: It's not real. It's not us. It's not that bad. It's too expensive to fix. Aha, here's a great solution (that actually does nothing). And – oh no! Now it's too late. You really should have warned us earlier."

=== Outreach to Christian communities ===
In a 2019 op-ed in the New York Times titled "I’m a Climate Scientist who believes in God", Hayhoe explains that, “I chose what to study precisely because of my faith, because climate change disproportionately affects the poor and vulnerable, those already most at risk today. To me, caring about and acting on climate was a way to live out my calling to love others as we’ve been loved ourselves by God."

In 2009, she and her husband, Andrew Farley, co-authored a book called A Climate for Change: Global Warming Facts for Faith-Based Decisions, which outlines the ways in which climate science reflects conservative Christian beliefs. The book resulted in word-of-mouth referrals across various Christian communities, who began to invite Hayhoe to speak at Christian colleges, churches, and other conservative groups. In the book, she stated that acceptance of climate change does not mean "that we have to believe in evolution or a four billion year old earth". Notably, when Hayhoe first met her husband and co-author, he was skeptical of global warming, but shifted his views. She notes that she was able to change his mind over the course of a year and a half, with the help of data collected on a NASA website that documents rising global temperatures over time. Hayhoe has recognized that those debates with her husband sharpened her skills as a communicator engaging audiences skeptical of climate science.

The effectiveness of her outreach efforts to Christian communities have been the subject of study. She delivers lectures that are rooted in scripture and focus on the benefits of collective action to mitigate the effects of climate change. A 2017 study tested the effectiveness of a climate lecture Hayhoe delivered to students at the predominantly evangelical school Houghton College, in which she devoted time to a discussion of theology-based ethics and delivered information about climate change through a lens of evangelical tradition. Following her lecture, students exhibited more willingness to accept that global warming is a true phenomenon and had an increased awareness of the expert scientific consensus. A subsequent study showed that the more doubtful the audience, the greater the gains after listening to a recorded presentation by Hayhoe on climate science, impacts, and solutions.

In an interview with ThinkProgress, Hayhoe said: "When we tie that to our Christian values there’s no conflict. In fact, quite the opposite – our faith demands that we act on this issue."

=== Television and video ===
In 2014, Hayhoe served as a science advisor to the documentary TV series Years of Living Dangerously, an Emmy Award–winning Showtime series that details how climate change has already impacted lives around the world. She was featured in the first episode of the series, meeting with actor Don Cheadle to discuss why she believed her Christian faith and her belief in the need to act on climate were not at odds, as well as the fourth episode.

Hayhoe also hosted and produced a digital series with PBS called Global Weirding: Climate, Politics, and Religion, which launched September 2016 and ran through March 2019.

=== Newt Gingrich book ===
Hayhoe wrote a chapter of a book by Newt Gingrich about climate change in 2009, and, in 2011, was told by Gingrich's co-author, Terry Maple, that it had been accepted. Gingrich announced in late 2011 that this chapter was dropped on his request, saying, "We didn't know that they were doing that, and we told them to kill it."

Upon finding out that her chapter had been dropped, Hayhoe stated, "I had not heard that" and tweeted that she had spent over 100 unpaid hours working on the chapter. Some have speculated that Gingrich dropped her chapter because Marc Morano, who is not a scientist, wrote many articles on his website, Climate Depot, attacking her findings. This, as well as her appearing on Bill O'Reilly's TV show, led to her receiving nearly 200 hate-mail messages the following day. Shortly after, the conservative political action committee American Tradition Institute filed a request under the Freedom of Information Act for Hayhoe's public university employer to release her notes and emails related to the writing of the unpublished chapter for the Gingrich book.

== Works ==
- "Katharine Hayhoe". Google Scholar.
- Hayhoe, Katharine; Farley, Andrew (2009). A climate for change: global warming facts for faith-based decisions. FaithWords. ISBN 978-0-446-54956-1. OCLC 318100426.
- Kotamarthi, Rao; Hayhoe, Katherine; Mearns, Linda O; Wuebbles, Donald J; Jacobs, Jennifer; Jurado, Jennifer (February 5, 2021). Downscaling Techniques for High-Resolution Climate Projections: From Global Change to Local Impacts. Cambridge, UK: Cambridge University Press. ISBN 978-1-108-60126-9. OCLC 1241683497.
- Hayhoe, Katharine (September 21, 2021). Saving Us: A Climate Scientist's Case for Hope and Healing in a Divided World (First ed.). New York, NY: One Signal Publishers. ISBN 978-1-9821-4383-1. OCLC 1262751074.

== Awards and honors ==
- Katharine Hayhoe is the recipient of the Lifetime Achievement Award (Champions of the Earth) in 2019.
- United Nations Champions of the Earth, 2019
- Foreign Policy magazine 100 Leading Global Thinkers, 2019
- Stephen H. Schneider Award for Outstanding Science Communication, 2018
- Fortune magazine's 50 World's Great Leaders, 2017
- National Center for Science Education Friend of the Planet award, 2016
- Time magazine's 100 Most Influential People, 2014
- American Geophysical Union Climate Communications Prize, 2014
