= Alfa Demmellash =

Ethiopian entrepreneur

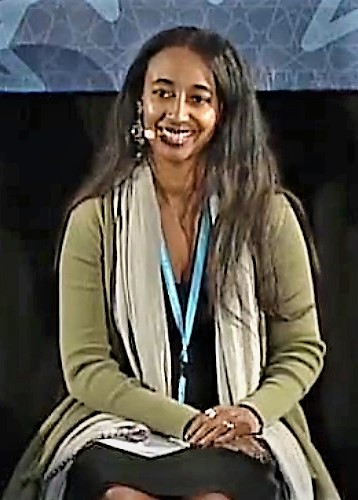
- Demmellash at SOCAP conference in 2017
- Born: 1979-1980; Jigjiga, Ethiopia
- Education: Harvard University
- Awards: Heinz Award in Technology, Economy & Employment (2020); World Economic Forum Young Global Leader

Alfa Demmellash (born 1979–1980) is an Ethiopian entrepreneur and the chief executive officer of the non-profit Rising Tide Capital. Demmellash works to support entrepreneurs from disadvantaged communities. She has been honoured by the World Economic Forum, Heinz Awards and CNN.

== Early life and education ==
Demmellash was born in Ethiopia. At the age of only two, she lost two of her siblings to a civil war, and her mother fled the country. Demmellash moved close to her grandparents' home where she attended a Montessori school. Her mother travelled through Kenya and eventually ended up in the United States, where she worked to earn enough money to move Demmellash to the United States as well. By day, Demmellash's mother worked as a waitress, and by night she was a seamstress, creating Ethiopian-inspired clothing. Eventually she earned enough money, and, at the age of 12, Demmellash moved to Boston. Demmellash was an undergraduate student at Harvard University, where she specialised in politics. As an undergraduate student Demmellash was involved with the Harvard African Students Associations. Whilst at Harvard Demmellash met Alex Forrester, a New Jersey native with whom she shared concerns about urban poverty.

== Career ==
After graduating Demmellash moved to New Jersey, where she established Rising Tide Capital in 2004. Demmellash travelled around Camden and Newark where she interacted with community members and innovators. Rising Tide Capital looked to provide social, knowledge and financial capital to communities of color. They create a Community Business Academy, which provides intense training to people from low to moderate-income people.

In 2020 Demmellash and her husband, Alex Forrester, were honored with the 25th Annual Heinz Award in Technology, the Economy and Employment, for their work “to transform lives and communities by providing entrepreneurs who lack access to services and resources the business training, mentorship, and financial access needed to successfully launch and manage their own small businesses,”.

== Awards and honours ==
- 2009 CNN Hero
- 2012 Forbes Most Powerful Women Changing the World with Philanthropy
- 2015 World Economic Forum Young Global Leader
- 2020 25th Annual Heinz Award in Technology, Economy & Employment

== Personal life ==
Demmellash is married to her business partner, Alex Forrester, with whom she has two children. Her efforts were recognised by Barack Obama in a speech at the White House.
