= Heinz Awards =

Honorary Award

- Awarded for: Innovative contributions in: Arts (visual); Economy; Environment
- Sponsored by: Heinz Family Foundation
- Date: Established 1993
- Country: United States
- Reward: US$250,000
- Website: heinzawards.org

The Heinz Awards was an annual philanthropic program presented by the Heinz Family Foundation to recognize outstanding individuals. The program was established in 1993 by Teresa Heinz (chair of the Heinz Family Foundation) in honor of her late husband, U.S. Senator H. John Heinz III and concluded at the end of 2025. The Heinz Awards were considered to be among the largest individual achievement prizes in the world.

From their inception until 2019, the Awards encompassed the categories of Arts and Humanities; Environment; Human Condition; Public Policy; and Technology, the Economy and Employment. Subsequently, they recognized outstanding individuals for their innovative contributions in three areas: the Arts, the Economy and the Environment.

Each recipient received an unrestricted prize of US$250,000 and a cast silver medallion. In 2009 through 2011, the Awards held Special Focus years on the Environment and Global Change, and expanded its recognition to 10 recipients annually, each receiving US$100,000 and a medallion. The Heinz Awards medallion displays the likeness of Senator Heinz and the words "Shared Ideals Realized" on its front side, excerpted from a quote by the late Senator Heinz. Its reverse side features an image of a globe being exchanged between two hands.

== Selection ==
As written by the Heinz Family Foundation, candidates selected for the Heinz Awards met three standards:

First, nominees exhibited the following personal characteristics: A passion for excellence that went beyond intellectual curiosity; a concern for humanity rooted in a deep sensitivity to the well-being of others; and a broad vision that extended far beyond the particular and embraced something universal.

Second, the work of the nominees met the following criteria: it was significant and not a "quick fix"; it demonstrated enduring and meaningful impact; it was creative and innovative; and it was sufficiently tangible to serve as a model for replication elsewhere.

Third, candidates were actively working in the field in which they were nominated so that the award would enhance their potential for future societal contribution.

Nominations were submitted by invited experts, who served anonymously. Submissions were researched and evaluated by Foundation staff and reviewed by jurors appointed by the Heinz Family Foundation. Jurors in each category made recommendations to the program’s board of directors, which selected the Award recipients.

=== Chairman's Medal ===
In certain years, the Heinz Awards board also chose to honor the lifetime achievement of a particular individual. The award was a non-monetary prize, and the honoree was presented with the Heinz Awards medallion at the same ceremony as the other laureates.

== Recipients ==
Recipients of The Heinz Awards

30th Heinz Awards – 2025
| Category | Recipient |
|---|---|
| Arts | Jennifer Packer |
| Arts | Marie Watt |
| Economy | Byron Auguste |
| Economy | Sara Bronin |
| Environment | Dana Gunders |
| Environment | Sacoby Wilson |

29th Heinz Awards – 2024
| Category | Recipient |
|---|---|
| Arts | Jennie C. Jones |
| Arts | Gala Porras-Kim |
| Economy | Aisha Nyandoro (Springboard to Opportunities, Magnolia Mother’s Trust) |
| Economy | Jessica Sager and Janna Wagner (All Our Kin) |
| Environment | Amira Diamond and Melinda Kramer (Women’s Earth Alliance) |
| Environment | Scott Loarie and Ken-ichi Ueda (iNaturalist) |

28th Heinz Awards – 2023
| Category | Recipient |
|---|---|
| Arts | Kevin Beasley |
| Arts | Roberto Lugo |
| Economy | Kathryn Finney |
| Economy | Leah Penniman |
| Environment | Nicole Horseherder |
| Environment | Colette Pichon Battle |

27th Heinz Awards – 2022
| Category | Recipient |
|---|---|
| Arts | vanessa german |
| Arts | Cauleen Smith |
| Economy | Hilary Abell and Alison Lingane |
| Economy | Chrystel Cornelius |
| Environment | Rhett Ayers Butler |
| Environment | Anne Evens |

26th Heinz Awards – 2021
| Category | Recipient |
|---|---|
| Arts | Tanya Aguiñiga |
| Arts | Sanford Biggers |
| Economy | Dina Bakst and Sherry Leiwant (A Better Balance) |
| Economy | Bill Bynum |
| Environment | Gabe Brown |
| Environment | Jacqueline Patterson |

25th Heinz Awards – 2020
| Category | Recipient |
|---|---|
| Arts and Humanities | Gabriela Lena Frank |
| Environment | Linda Behnken |
| Human Condition | Molly Baldwin |
| Public Policy | Katy Kozhimannil |
| Technology, the Economy and Employment | Alfa Demmellash and Alex Forrester |
| Special Award Commemorating the 25th Heinz Awards Anniversary | David Autor |

24th Heinz Awards – 2019
| Category | Recipient |
|---|---|
| Arts and Humanities | Kevin Jerome Everson |
| Environment | Rue Mapp |
| Human Condition | Sarah Szanton |
| Public Policy | Amanda Nguyen |
| Technology, the Economy and Employment | Brandon Dennison |

23rd Heinz Awards – 2018
| Category | Recipient |
|---|---|
| Arts and Humanities | Ralph Lemon |
| Environment | Ming Kuo |
| Human Condition | Norman Atkins |
| Public Policy | Sherri Mason |
| Public Policy | Enric Sala |
| Technology, the Economy and Employment | Linda Rottenberg |

22nd Heinz Awards – 2017
| Category | Recipient |
|---|---|
| Arts and Humanities | Natasha Trethewey |
| Environment | Gregory Asner |
| Human Condition | Angela Blanchard |
| Public Policy | Mona Hanna |
| Technology, the Economy and Employment | Joseph DeSimone |

21st Heinz Awards – 2016
| Category | Recipient |
|---|---|
| Arts and Humanities | Troy Andrews |
| Environment | Hal Harvey |
| Human Condition | Nadine Burke Harris |
| Public Policy | Michelle Alexander |
| Technology, the Economy and Employment | Matthew Mullenweg |

20th Heinz Awards – 2015
| Category | Recipient |
|---|---|
| Arts and Humanities | Roz Chast |
| Environment | Frederica Perera |
| Human Condition | William McNulty and Jacob Wood |
| Public Policy | Aaron Wolf |
| Technology, the Economy and Employment | Sangeeta Bhatia |

19th Heinz Awards – 2013
| Category | Recipient |
|---|---|
| Arts and Humanities | Abraham Verghese |
| Environment | Jonathan Foley |
| Human Condition | Salman Khan |
| Public Policy | Sanjeev Arora (physician) |
| Technology, the Economy and Employment | Leila Janah |

18th Heinz Awards – 2012
| Category | Recipient |
|---|---|
| Arts and Humanities | Mason Bates |
| Environment | Richard J. Jackson |
| Human Condition | Freeman Hrabowski III |
| Public Policy | KC Golden |
| Technology, the Economy and Employment | Jay Keasling |

17th Heinz Awards with Special Focus on the Environment – 2011
| Category | Recipient |
|---|---|
| Special Focus on the Environment | John Luther Adams |
| Special Focus on the Environment | Richard Alley |
| Special Focus on the Environment | Janine Benyus |
| Special Focus on the Environment | Ian Cheney and Curt Ellis |
| Special Focus on the Environment | Louis Guillette |
| Special Focus on the Environment | Joan Kleypas |
| Special Focus on the Environment | Nancy Knowlton |
| Special Focus on the Environment | Nancy Rabalais |
| Special Focus on the Environment | Sandra Steingraber |

16th Heinz Awards with Special Focus on Global Change – 2010
| Category | Recipient |
|---|---|
| Special Focus on Global Change | James Balog |
| Special Focus on Global Change | Terrence Collins |
| Special Focus on Global Change | Gretchen Daily |
| Special Focus on Global Change | Richard Feely |
| Special Focus on Global Change | Cary Fowler |
| Special Focus on Global Change | Lynn Goldman |
| Special Focus on Global Change | Elizabeth Kolbert |
| Special Focus on Global Change | Michael Oppenheimer |
| Special Focus on Global Change | Daniel Sperling |
| Special Focus on Global Change | Frederick vom Saal |

15th Heinz Awards with Special Focus on the Environment – 2009
| Category | Recipient |
|---|---|
| Special Focus on the Environment | Robert Berkebile |
| Special Focus on the Environment | P. Dee Boersma |
| Special Focus on the Environment | Christopher Field |
| Special Focus on the Environment | Ashok Gadgil |
| Special Focus on the Environment | Chip Giller |
| Special Focus on the Environment | Deborah Rice |
| Special Focus on the Environment | Joel Salatin |
| Special Focus on the Environment | Kirk R. Smith |
| Special Focus on the Environment | Thomas Smith |
| Special Focus on the Environment | Beverly Wright |

14th Heinz Awards – 2008
| Category | Recipient |
|---|---|
| Arts and Humanities | Ann Hamilton |
| Environment | Thomas FitzGerald |
| Human Condition | Brenda Krause Eheart |
| Public Policy | Robert Greenstein |
| Technology, the Economy and Employment | Joseph DeRisi |

13th Heinz Awards – 2007
| Category | Recipient |
|---|---|
| Arts and Humanities | Dave Eggers |
| Environment | Bernard Amadei (co-awardee) |
| Environment | Susan Seacrest (co-awardee) |
| Human Condition | David L. Heymann |
| Public Policy | Donald Berwick |
| Technology, the Economy and Employment | Hugh Herr |

12th Heinz Awards – 2006
| Category | Recipient |
|---|---|
| Arts and Humanities | James Nachtwey |
| Environment | Paul Anastas |
| Human Condition | William Thomas |
| Public Policy | Bruce Katz |
| Technology, the Economy and Employment | Leroy Hood |
| The Chairman's Medal | Elma Holder |

11th Heinz Awards – 2005
| Category | Recipient |
|---|---|
| Arts and Humanities | Mark di Suvero |
| Environment | Jerry F. Franklin |
| Human Condition | Joseph Rogers |
| Public Policy | Sidney Drell |
| Technology, the Economy and Employment | Mildred Dresselhaus |
| The Chairman's Medal | Richard Goldman |

10th Heinz Awards – 2004
| Category | Recipient |
|---|---|
| Arts and Humanities | August Wilson |
| Environment | Peggy Shepard |
| Human Condition | Robert Butler |
| Public Policy | Julius Richmond |
| Technology, the Economy and Employment | Robert Langer |
| The Chairman's Medal | Richard Lugar and Sam Nunn |

9th Heinz Awards – 2003
| Category | Recipient |
|---|---|
| Arts and Humanities | Bernice Johnson Reagon |
| Environment | Mario Molina (co-awardee) |
| Environment | John Spengler (co-awardee) |
| Human Condition | Paul Farmer |
| Public Policy | Geraldine Jensen |
| Technology, the Economy and Employment | Paul MacCready |

8th Heinz Awards – 2002
| Category | Recipient |
|---|---|
| Arts and Humanities | Dudley Cocke (co-awardee) |
| Arts and Humanities | Rick Lowe (co-awardee) |
| Environment | Jane Lubchenco |
| Human Condition | Cushing Dolbeare |
| Public Policy | George Lee Butler |
| Technology, the Economy and Employment | Anita Borg |
| The Chairman's Medal | Ruth Patrick |

7th Heinz Awards – 2001
| Category | Recipient |
|---|---|
| Arts and Humanities | Jacques d'Amboise (co-awardee) |
| Arts and Humanities | Arthur Mitchell (co-awardee) |
| Environment | James Hansen |
| Human Condition | Aaron Beck |
| Public Policy | John Holdren |
| Technology, the Economy and Employment | Steve Wozniak |
| The Chairman's Medal | Dorothy Height |
| The Chairman's Medal | Russell Train |

6th Heinz Awards – 2000
| Category | Recipient |
|---|---|
| Arts and Humanities | Peter Matthiessen |
| Environment | Paul Gorman |
| Human Condition | Robert P. Moses |
| Public Policy | Edward Zigler |
| Technology, the Economy and Employment | Mary Good |

5th Heinz Awards – 1999
| Category | Recipient |
|---|---|
| Arts and Humanities | Walter Turnbull |
| Environment | Lois Gibbs (co-awardee) |
| Environment | Florence Robinson (co-awardee) |
| Human Condition | Luis Acosta and Frances Lucerna |
| Public Policy | Daniel Patrick Moynihan |
| Technology, the Economy and Employment | Dean Kamen |

4th Heinz Awards – 1998
| Category | Recipient |
|---|---|
| Arts and Humanities | John Harbison |
| Environment | Amory Lovins |
| Human Condition | Carol Gilligan |
| Public Policy | Ernesto Cortes |
| Technology, the Economy and Employment | Ralph E. Gomory |

3rd Heinz Awards – 1997
| Category | Recipient |
|---|---|
| Arts and Humanities | Rita Dove |
| Environment | George Woodwell |
| Human Condition | James Comer |
| Public Policy | Ralph Cavanagh |
| Technology, the Economy and Employment | George Hatsopoulos |
| The Chairman's Medal | William R. Hewlett and David Packard |

2nd Heinz Awards – 1996
| Category | Recipient |
|---|---|
| Arts and Humanities | Beverly Sills |
| Environment | Herbert Needleman |
| Human Condition | Marian Wright Edelman |
| Public Policy | C. Everett Koop |
| Technology, the Economy and Employment | William J. Rutter |

1st Heinz Awards – 1995
| Category | Recipient |
|---|---|
| Arts and Humanities | Henry Hampton |
| Environment | Paul and Anne Ehrlich |
| Human Condition | Geoffrey Canada |
| Public Policy | James Goodby |
| Technology, the Economy and Employment | Andrew Grove |

== See also ==
- List of awards for contributions to culture
- List of awards for contributions to society
- List of environmental awards
