= Nicole Horseherder =

Native American environmental activist

- Born: Black Mesa, Arizona
- Citizenship: Navajo Nation and U.S.
- Education: University of Arizona; University of British Columbia (MA)
- Occupation: Environmental activist
- Awards: Heinz Award (2023)

Nicole Horseherder is a Native American environmental activist. A member of the Navajo Nation, Horseherder is an advocate for water conservation and land reclamation. She co-founded the nonprofit Tó Nizhóní Ání in response to the Black Mesa Peabody Coal controversy and is currently the executive director.

== Early life and education ==
Horseherder grew up on the Black Mesa plateau. She graduated from the University of Arizona with a degree in Family and Consumer Resources. In 1998, she earned her Master of Arts in linguistics from the University of British Columbia.

== Career ==
After returning home from graduate school, Horseherder learned that the springs which supplied water to her family's farm had run dry. The region's aquifer had been depleted by mining performed by the Peabody Western Coal Company, also exposing local residents to coal dust. Encouraged by community elders, Horseherder turned to environmental activism to fight the issue. In 2000, she co-founded the nonprofit Tó Nizhóní Ání, which translates to Sacred Water Speaks.

From 2000 to 2005, Horseherder ran a campaign to get support to shut down the Black Mesa Mine. Efforts focused on securing supportive resolutions from local chapter houses. In 2003, the Navajo Tribal Council approved her resolution to cease pulling water from the Navajo aquifer in support of coal mining. Peabody's mining operations were shut down in 2005. Horseherder also campaigned to close the Navajo Generating Station, a coal powered plant that was closed in 2019 and demolished in 2021.

Horseherder has been critical of the Office of Surface Mining Reclamation and Enforcement for failing to enforce reclamation activities of the Black Mesa Mine against Peabody.

== Awards and honors ==
In 2023, Horseherder received a Heinz Award in recognition of her efforts to "protect the water, air and landscapes of the Navajo Nation".
