= Phil Duffy =

American climate scientist

Philip B. Duffy
- Education: Harvard College (B.A.); Stanford University (Ph.D.)
- Known for: Climate policy advising Greenhouse gas monitoring IPCC contributions
- Awards: Nobel Peace Prize (with IPCC authors)
- Scientific career
- Fields: Climate science
- Workplaces: Lawrence Livermore National Laboratory; Woodwell Climate Research Center; White House Office of Science and Technology Policy; Spark Climate Solutions

Philip B. Duffy is an American climate scientist who has served as an advisor to the White House Office of Science and Technology Policy (OSTP) during the Obama and Biden administrations. He was previously the president and executive director of the Woodwell Climate Research Center.

== Early life and education ==
Duffy earned a bachelor's degree in astronomy and astrophysics from Harvard College and a Ph.D. in applied physics from Stanford University. His interest in climate science was influenced by the work of his mother, a physicist who studied the cycles of ice ages.

== Career ==
Duffy began his career at the Lawrence Livermore National Laboratory. His research involved the development of early climate models using massively parallel computing and simulations of the global carbon cycle.

=== Government and policy ===
During the Obama administration, Duffy was a senior policy analyst at the OSTP (2011–2012) and a senior advisor to the U.S. Global Change Research Program (2013–2015). He participated in U.S. delegations for the Intergovernmental Panel on Climate Change (IPCC) and contributed to the scientific reviews that preceded the 2015 Paris Agreement.

In the Biden administration, Duffy returned to the OSTP as a climate science advisor from 2021 to 2024. In this role, he co-led an interagency initiative to develop a national greenhouse gas monitoring system and directed a research agenda regarding solar radiation modification.

=== Non-profit work ===
From 2015 to 2022, Duffy was the president and executive director of the Woodwell Climate Research Center (formerly the Woods Hole Research Center). Following his tenure in the White House, he joined Spark Climate Solutions as chief scientist.

== Awards and recognition ==
Duffy was part of the IPCC cohort that shared the 2007 Nobel Peace Prize. He is also a recipient of the Global Citizen Award from the United Nations Association of the United States of America.

== See also ==
- Climate policy of the United States
