= John Spengler =

American health scholar

- Awards: 9th Heinz Award

Academic background
- Education: University of Notre Dame; Harvard University

Academic work
- Discipline: Health
- Sub-discipline: Personal monitoring, the health effects of air and other environmental pollution, indoor air pollution, and other environmental sustainability issues
- Institutions: Harvard T.H. Chan School of Public Health

John Daniel Spengler is an American health scholar currently serving as the Akira Yamaguchi Professor of Environmental Health and Human Habitation at Harvard T. H. Chan School of Public Health and a faculty member in the Harvard Department of Environmental Science and Public Policy and Harvard Faculty of Arts and Sciences.

== Education ==
Spengler earned a Bachelor of Science degree in physics from the University of Notre Dame, a Master of Science in environmental health sciences from Harvard University, a Master of Science from the Harvard T.H. Chan School of Public Health, and Doctor in Atmospheric Sciences from University at Albany.

== Career ==
Spengler has conducted research personal monitoring, the health effects of air and other environmental pollution, indoor air pollution, and other environmental sustainability issues.

Spengler chaired the committee on Harvard Sustainability Principles, served on Harvard's Greenhouse Gases Taskforce to develop the university's carbon reduction goals and strategies, and was a member of Harvard's Greenhouse Gases Executive Committee.

Spengler has been an advisor to the World Health Organization on indoor air pollution, personal exposure, and air pollution epidemiology.

In 2003, Spengler received the 9th Heinz Award for outstanding contributions to research related to the environment.

== External references ==
- Harvard profile
