= Jacqueline Patterson =

American environmental and social justice activist)

Jacqueline (Jacqui) Patterson is founder of The Shirley Chisholm Legacy Project and former director of the NAACP Environmental and Climate Justice Program, which are dedicated to addressing the intersecting issues of environmental and social justice. Her work focuses on empowering marginalized communities, particularly Black women, by providing resources and advocating for systemic change towards a sustainable and equitable future.

== Early life and education ==
Jaqui Patterson grew up near coal-fired power plants on the south side of Chicago. Her mother moved to Chicago through the Great Migration and her father was from Jamaica. Although she knew kids in her class who had asthma, people in her church who needed respirators, and her father had died from pulmonary fibrosis even though he'd never smoked, she didn't initially make the connection between the air pollution in her neighborhood and these health consequences. Her mother died at age 73 from colon cancer, her brother at age 56 from bile duct cancer, and childhood friends also died prematurely. Patterson decided to work to try to remove toxin exposure from neighborhoods like the one she grew up in.

She served as a U.S. Peace Corps volunteer in Jamaica and holds a Master of Social Work (MSW) from the University of Maryland and Master of Public Health (MPH) from Johns Hopkins University.

== Career ==
Patterson began her career aspiring to be a special education teacher. However, her experience in the Peace Corps revealed the systemic issues affecting education and healthcare, driven by broader systems of extraction and domination, e.g. Shell Oil contaminating community water supplies in Jamaica. This realization about the interplay of political and economic systems in compromising human rights led her to pursue a path in social justice work.

After obtaining her master's degrees, Patterson took on the role of Research Coordinator at Johns Hopkins University, getting into public health and policy research. She continued her advocacy as an Outreach Project Associate for the Center on Budget and Policy Priorities, focusing on social justice issues, and later served as the Assistant Vice-president of HIV/AIDS Programs for IMA World Health, addressing public health crises in marginalized communities. Her social justice orientation led her to become the Senior Women's Rights Policy Analyst for ActionAid, where she worked towards global gender equality. It was these experiences that led Patterson to examine intersectional approaches to systems change.

From 2009 to 2021, she served as the founding director of the NAACP Environmental and Climate Justice Program (ECJP), organizing communities and NAACP chapters to combat environmental injustices impacting communities of color and low-income populations. Under her leadership, the ECJP tackled issues like clean water, carbon impacts, and land equity. She co-authored the Coal Blooded report, which highlighted the health impacts of emissions from coal-fired power plants on nearby communities with a disproportionate negative impact on Black and Latin American communities. She also led efforts to spread the message of these impacts.

In 2021, she founded and became the executive director of The Chisholm Legacy Project, a resource hub for Black frontline climate justice leadership. Rooted in the Just Transition Framework, the project advocates for systemic change driven by those most affected by environmental and social injustices. Unlike larger nonprofits that typically focus on single issues, The Chisholm Legacy Project addresses environmental issues, poverty, racial discrimination, and gender inequality collectively. For this work she was honored with the Earth Award at the 2024 TIME Women of the year gala.

== Awards and recognition ==
- 2021 Heinz Award for the Environment
- 2023 Women and The Green Economy Leadership Award
- 2024 TIME Women of the year – Earth Award

== Selected articles and book chapters ==
- Patterson, Jacqui (April 23, 2010). "Climate Change is a Civil Rights Issue". The Root.
- Patterson, Jacqui (April 16, 2011). "Gulf Oil Drilling Disaster: Gendered Layers of Impact". On the Issues.
- Patterson, Jacqui (2013). "Equity in Disasters: Civil and Human Rights Challenges in the Context of Emergency Events". In Standaert, Diane M.; Gilmore, Dorcas R. (eds.). Building Community Resilience Post-disaster. American Bar Association. ISBN 9781627221788.
- Smith, Jackie; Patterson, Jacqueline (2018). "Global Climate Justice Activism: "The New Protagonists" and Their Projects for a Just Transition". In Frey, R. Scott; Gellert, Paul K.; Dahms, Harry F. (eds.). Ecologically Unequal Exchange. Palgrave Macmillan. doi:10.1007/978-3-319-89740-0. ISBN 978-3-319-89739-4.
- Patterson, Jacqui (2021). "At the Intersections". In Johnson, Ayana Elizabeth; Wilkinson, Katharine K. (eds.). All We Can Save:Truth, Courage, and Solutions for the Climate Crisis. Random House. pp. 194–202. ISBN 9780593237083.
