= Linda Behnken =

American commercial fisher

- Born: Connecticut
- Education: Dartmouth College; Yale School of Forestry
- Occupations: Commercial fisher, executive director
- Awards: Heinz Award

Linda Behnken is an American commercial fisher who promotes sustainable fishing and conservation policies. Based in Sitka, Alaska, she has founded multiple organizations focused on the needs of small-scale fishers.

== Early life and education ==
Behnken was born and raised in Connecticut. Growing up, she played ice hockey in both high school and college. During her first summer off from Dartmouth College, Behnken landed a job as a commercial fisher in Sitka, Alaska, eventually dedicating herself to the trade. She earned her Bachelor of Arts from Dartmouth followed by a Master of Science from the Yale School of Forestry and Environmental Studies. She cites her early exposure to water issues such as plastic bags in the ocean and "large-scale fishing operations" as her motivation to pursue her Masters at Yale.

== Career ==
Behnken became the executive director of the Alaska Longline Fishermen's Association (ALFA) in 1991. As executive director, she advocates for both sustainable fisheries and small-scale fishing operations. In 1998, ALFA helped pass a ban on trawling in southeast Alaska, the largest ban of its kind at the time. Behnken was a member of the North Pacific Fishery Management Council from 1992 to 2001.

In 2016, Behnken was appointed to the International Pacific Halibut Commission. Behnken is also a founding member of the Alaska Sustainable Fisheries Trust, an organization dedicated to promoting commercial fishing to the younger generation. During the COVID-19 pandemic, both ALFA and the Alaska Sustainable Fisheries Trust delivered over 400,000 pounds of Alaskan seafood to families in need. She also helped found Alaskans Own, a community-supported fishery that sells seafood directly to the consumer.

Behnken runs a crew training program aimed at younger fishers in the industry, and has called for the older generation to advocate for the industry as a whole.

== Awards and honors ==
- In 2016, Behnken was recognized as a "Champion for Change" by the Obama White House
- in 2020, Behnken received the Heinz Award for her work on the environment
