= Louis J. Guillette Jr =

Louis J. Guillette Jr.
- Education: University of Colorado at Boulder
- Scientific career
- Fields: Biology
- Workplaces: Medical University of South Carolina; University of Florida

Louis J. Guillette Jr., Ph.D. (died 2015) was an American professor of embryology. Dr. Guillette received the 17th Annual Heinz Award with special focus on the environment in 2011.
