= A Better Balance =

American labor advocacy organization

A Better Balance is a national nonprofit 501(c)(3) organization with headquarters in New York City and offices in Nashville, Washington, D.C., and Denver. The organization focuses on legislative advocacy and education on labor issues, particularly relating to sick leave, parental leave, pregnancy discrimination, and work–life balance. The organization also provides a legal helpline for inquiries on workplace rights.

== Work ==
A Better Balance's work focuses on a range of work-family issues, including:

- Paid sick time
- Paid family and medical leave
- Legal protections for pregnant and postpartum workers, including lactating workers
- Legal protections for caregivers in the workplace
- Laws that promote fair workplace attendance policies and scheduling practices
- Legal protections for misclassified workers, as well as gig and app-based workers
- Combating state and federal preemption of local labor protections.
- Enforcement of Title IX protections for pregnant and parenting students.

== History ==
A Better Balance was founded in New York City in 2006 by Dina Bakst and Sherry Leiwant. Since then, the organization has expanded to include offices in Nashville, Tennessee; Washington, D.C.; and Denver, Colorado.

In 2013, A Better Balance was part of the coalition that campaigned successfully for New York City's Earned Sick Time Act, which went into effect in 2014. The organization also played a leading role in the coalition to pass New York's paid family leave law, which went into effect in 2018.

In 2014, A Better Balance opened a Southern Office in Nashville, Tennessee.

Since its founding, the organization has played a role in drafting and passing legislation providing workers with paid sick leave, paid family and medical leave, and an affirmative right to workplace pregnancy accommodations in numerous localities and states across the country, including in Tennessee, Connecticut, Louisiana, Colorado, Massachusetts, and more.

In 2017, alongside the National Women's Law Center and Mehri & Skalet, and Sedey Harper & Westhoff, A Better Balance filed a nationwide class-action lawsuit against Walmart for failure to accommodate pregnant workers. A Better Balance filed additional charges of disability discrimination against Walmart later that year. In 2020, a federal court granted final approval to a $14 million settlement in the matter of Borders v. Wal-Mart Stores, Inc.

In 2024, Bakst and Leiwant stepped down as co-presidents and Inimai Chettiar took over as the organization’s president.

=== Pregnant Workers Fairness Act ===
A Better Balance played a leading role in the 2022 passage of the federal Pregnant Workers Fairness Act, which granted federal protections for pregnant and postpartum workers. Representative Jerry Nadler credited a January 2012 New York Times op-ed, "Pregnant, and Pushed Out of a Job," penned by the organization's co-founder and co-president Dina Bakst, as an inspiration for first introducing the bill in 2012. Bakst presented witness testimony at a 2019 House Education and Labor Committee hearing on the bill. The organization helped draft the language of the bill and was credited by Fast Company as the "primary driver" of the law. The organization has also published online resources to educate workers of their rights under the law.

== Recognition ==
In 2020, Time magazine named A Better Balance and co-founder & co-president Dina Bakst on their list of "16 People and Groups Fighting for a More Equal America."

In 2021, co-founders and co-presidents Bakst and Sherry Leiwant were awarded the Heinz Award for the Economy for A Better Balance's advocacy and policy work.

== See also ==
- Parental leave in the United States
- Pregnant Workers Fairness Act
- Sick leave in the United States
- Work–life interface
