= Chip Giller =

American journalist and environmentalist

- Born: Massachusetts
- Education: Brown University
- Occupation: Journalist
- Known for: Founder of Grist
- Awards: Heinz Award (2009)

Chip Giller is an American journalist and environmentalist. He is best known as the founder of Grist, an online environmental news organization. Giller has won numerous awards for his media innovations and environmental work, including receiving a Heinz Award, and being named a "Hero of the Environment" by Time magazine. He has been featured in media outlets like Vanity Fair, Newsweek, and Outside, and has participated as a guest on broadcast programs including NBC's Today and PBS's Now.

== Personal ==
Giller, a native of Massachusetts, obtained his honors degree in environmental studies from Brown University. He lives with his wife and two children in the Seattle area.

== Early work ==
Giller was a reporter with High Country News and an editor at Greenwire before founding Grist. He was a three-time journalism fellow with the Institutes for Journalism and Natural Resources and a senior fellow with the Environmental Leadership Program.

== Grist ==
Giller founded the online environmental news site Grist in 1999. Grist was among the first publications to draw connections between the environment and such areas as food, economics, and health. Its work has included political coverage, including exclusive interviews with all of the candidates in the 2008 presidential election; a seven-week series on poverty and the environment; and influential climate and energy reporting. Grist earned Webby Awards in 2005 and 2006, an honor described by The New York Times as "the Oscars of the internet". Utne gave Grist its Independent Press Award for Online Political Coverage in 2003 and 2005, citing its "rich mix of hard-hitting eco-political coverage, practical tips, hopeful tales, and rib-tickling whimsy." In 2007, Grist published Wake Up and Smell the Planet: The Nonpompous, Nonpreachy Grist Guide to Greening Your Day, which won a silver medal at Independent Publisher Book Awards.

== Awards and honors ==
Giller was honored with the 15th annual Heinz Award with special focus on the environment, for his media innovations, and for making environmental issues relevant to new and broad audiences. He was named a "Hero of the Environment" by Time magazine, and a "New Media Hero" by AlterNet. The National Wildlife Federation honored Giller with the National Conservation Achievement Award, and he received the Jane Bagley Lehman Award for Excellence in Public Advocacy from the Tides Foundation in recognition of the role Grist has played in increasing environmental awareness.
