= Andrew Farley (author) =

American author and pastor

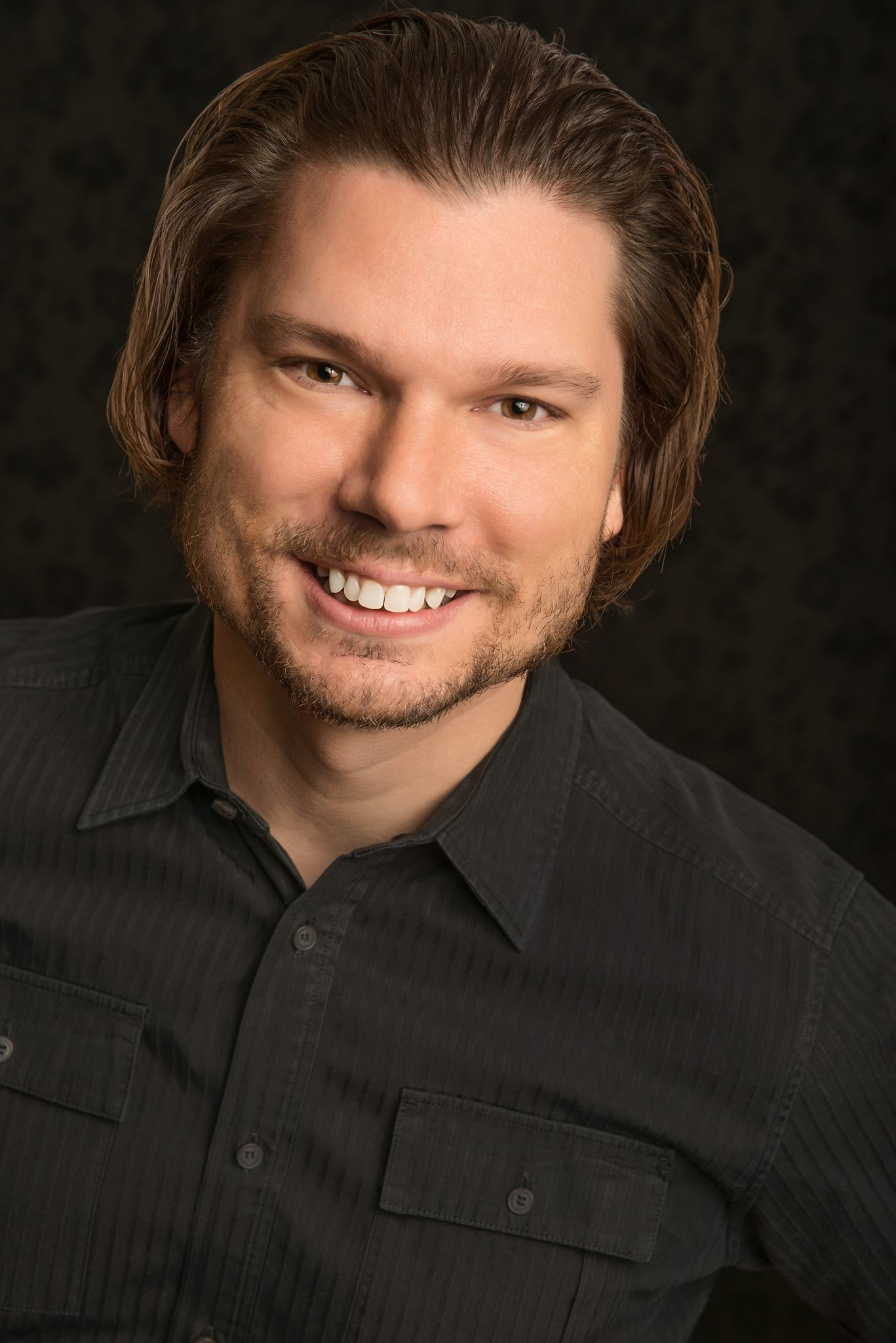
- Born: October 31, 1972 (age 53)
- Occupations: Author, pastor, linguist
- Spouse: Katharine Hayhoe
- Children: 1
- Writing career
- Notable work: The Naked Gospel
- Website: www.andrewfarley.org

Andrew Farley (born October 31, 1972) is an American evangelical Christian, the author of eleven best-selling books, including The Naked Gospel and God Without Religion, and the lead pastor of The Grace Church, with campuses in Dallas and in Lubbock, Texas. For fifteen years, he served as a professor of Applied Linguistics at University of Notre Dame and at Texas Tech University. His program, The Grace Message with Dr. Andrew Farley, airs across North America on both SiriusXM and TBN television network.

== Education ==
Farley received his B.A. from Furman University, his M.A. from University of Georgia, and his Ph.D. in Applied Linguistics from University of Illinois at Urbana–Champaign.

== Career ==
For a time, Farley served as a professor of Linguistics at University of Notre Dame and at Texas Tech University. He also taught an honors course on The New Testament.

Now, Farley is a pastor, bestselling author, and nationally syndicated radio host. He speaks at churches, conferences, and universities around the United States and in Canada and has a nationwide call-in program every weeknight on SiriusXM called The Grace Message with Dr. Andrew Farley. He is known as one of the leading voices on radio, television, and online for the message of the finished work of Jesus Christ. He is the creator of BibleQuestions.com where millions of questions have been answered in over 145 countries. In addition, his commentary on the New Testament is available at BibleCommentary.org.

Farley is best known for the book The Naked Gospel (HarperCollins, 2009), which made him a bestselling author. Some of Farley's other books include God Without Religion, Heaven is Now, The Art of Spiritual War, The Hurt & The Healer (co-authored with MercyMe), Relaxing with God, and Gospel Zero. In 2019, Farley published Twisted Scripture: Untangling 45 Lies Christians Have Been Told.

Andrew's writings have been featured on Fox News, Patheos, PBS, TBN, and other networks. His Sunday morning messages are broadcast on Sirius XM and on TBN Television, the largest Christian TV network in the world.

Farley also serves as president of The Grace Message with Dr. Andrew Farley , a non-profit media ministry based in Dallas, Texas.

== Books ==
- The Naked Gospel. Zondervan. 2009. ISBN 978-0-310-29306-4
- God without Religion. Baker Publishing Group, 2011. ISBN 978-0-8010-1487-1
- Relaxing with God. Baker Publishing Group, 2014 ISBN 978-0-8010-1518-2
- Heaven is Now. Baker Publishing Group, 2014. ISBN 978-0-8010-1649-3
- Operation Screwtape. Baker Publishing Group, 2013. ISBN 978-0-8010-1447-5
- The Hurt and the Healer. with Bart Millard. Baker Publishing Group, 2013 ISBN 978-0-8010-1562-5
- Twisted Scripture. Salem Books, 2019. ISBN 978-1-62157-902-1
- The Perfect You. with Tim Chalas. Salem Books, 2021. ISBN 9781684511273
- The Grace Message. Salem Books, 2022. ISBN 1684511283
- Gospel Zero. Skyhorse Publishing. 2025. ISBN 9781510782365
