= Richard Feely =

American chemical oceanographer

Richard A. Feely is an American chemical oceanographer currently at NOAA and an Elected Fellow of the American Association for the Advancement of Science.

== Education ==
He earned his Ph.D at Texas A&M University in 1974.

== Research ==
His interests are ocean acidification, CO_{2} and carbon cycling. His highest paper is Anthropogenic ocean acidification over the twenty-first century and its impact on calcifying organisms at 3272 times, according to Google Scholar.

== Publications ==
- Chatterjee, A., M.M. Gierach, A.J. Sutton, R.A. Feely, D. Crisp, A. Eldering, M.R. Gunson, C.W. O’Dell, B.B. Stephens, and D.S. Schimel (2017): Influence of El Niño on atmospheric CO_{2} over the tropical Pacific Ocean: Findings from NASA’s OCO-2 mission. Science, 358(6360), eaam5776, doi: 10.1126/science.aam5776.
- Lindquist, A., A. Sutton, A. Devol, A. Winans, A. Coyne, B. Bodenstein, B. Curry, B. Herrmann, B. Sackmann, B. Tyler, C. Maloy, C. Greengrove, C. Fanshier, C. Krembs, C. Sabine, C. Cook, C. Hard, C. Greene, D. Lowry, D. Harvell, E. McPhee-Shaw, E. Haphey, G. Hannach, H. Bohlmann, H. Burgess, I. Smith, I. Kemp, J. Newton, J. Borchert, J. Mickett, J. Apple, J. Bos, J. Parrish, J. Ruffner, J. Keister, J. Masura, K. Devitt, K. Bumbaco, K. Stark, L. Hermanson, L. Claassen, L. Swanson, M. Burger, M. Schmidt, M. McCartha, M. Peacock, M. Eisenlord, M. Keyzers, N. Christman, N. Hamel, N. Burnett, N. Bond, O. Graham, P. Biondo, P. Hodum, R. Wilborn, R.A. Feely, S. Pearson, S. Alin, S. Albertson, S. Moore, S. Jaeger, S. Pool, S. Musielwicz, T. King, T. Good, T. Jones, T. Ross, T. Sandell, T. Burks, V. Trainer, V. Bowes, W. Ruef, and W. Eash-Loucks (2017): Puget Sound Marine Waters: 2016 Overview. S. Moore, R. Wold, K. Stark, J. Bos, P. Williams, N. Hamel, A. Edwards, C. Krembs, and J. Newton (eds.), NOAA Northwest Fisheries Science Center for the Puget Sound Ecosystem Monitoring Program’s (PSEMP) Marine Waters Workgroup
- Newton, J., T. Klinger, R.A. Feely, and Washington Marine Resources Advisory Council (2017): 2017 Addendum to Ocean Acidification: From Knowledge to Action, Washington State’s Strategic Response. EnviroIssues (ed.), Seattle, Washington.
