= Pregnant Workers Fairness Act =

2022 United States federal law

- Long title: To eliminate discrimination and promote women's health and economic security by ensuring reasonable workplace accommodations for workers whose ability to perform the functions of a job are limited by pregnancy, childbirth, or a related medical condition.
- Announced in: the 117th United States Congress
- Effective: June 27, 2023
- Number of co-sponsors: 228

Citations
- Public law: Pub. L. 117–328 (text) (PDF), Division II

Legislative history
- Introduced in the House as H.R. 1065 by Jerry Nadler (D–NY) on February 15, 2021; Committee consideration by Education and Labor, Oversight and Reform, House Judiciary; Passed the House on May 14, 2021 (315–101); Passed the Senate as the Division II of the Consolidated Appropriations Act of 2023 on December 22, 2022 (68–29) with amendment; House agreed to Senate amendment on December 23, 2022 (225–201–1); Signed into law by President Joe Biden on December 29, 2022

The Pregnant Workers Fairness Act is a United States law meant to eliminate discrimination and ensure workplace accommodations for workers with known limitations related to pregnancy, childbirth, or a related medical condition. It applies to employers having fifteen or more employees. Originally a stand-alone bill first introduced in 2012, the bill was included as Division II of the Consolidated Appropriations Act, 2023, which was passed by Congress on December 27, 2022, and signed by President Joe Biden on December 29, 2022. The bill went into force on June 27, 2023.

== Background ==
The Pregnant Workers Fairness Act was first introduced in the House of Representatives on May 8, 2012, by Rep. Jerry Nadler (D-NY) following the publication of a January 2012 New York Times op-ed, "Pregnant, and Pushed Out of a Job."

In 2014, the Senate Health, Education, Labor, and Pensions Committee held a hearing, "Economic Security for Working Women: A Roundtable Discussion," in which several witnesses discussed the need for the Pregnant Workers Fairness Act. In 2019 the House of Representatives Education & Labor Committee held the first-ever dedicated hearing on the Pregnant Workers Fairness Act entitled "Long Over Due: Exploring the Pregnant Workers Fairness Act." Witnesses included Congressman Jerry Nadler, Michelle Durham, an Alabama mother who was denied pregnancy accommodations, Iris Wilbur, then-Vice President of Greater Louisville Inc., Dina Bakst, Co-Founder & Co-President of A Better Balance, and Ellen McLaughlin, a partner at Seyfarth Shaw LLP.

In September 2020, the bill passed the House of Representatives by a vote of 329–73. In March 2021, the House of Representatives Education & Labor Committee held a hearing entitled "Fighting for Fairness: Examining Legislation to Confront Workplace Discrimination," with a focus on the Pregnant Workers Fairness Act, among other pieces of workplace legislation. In May 2021, the House of Representatives voted to pass the bill by a vote of 315–101. In August 2021, the Senate Health, Education, Labor, and Pensions Committee voted to pass the bill out of Committee by a vote of 19–2.

The text of the bill was inserted by the Senate into the Consolidated Appropriations Act, 2023, which was passed by Congress on December 27, 2022, which at the time was operating under procedures to handle the COVID-19 pandemic, which allowed for representatives to vote remotely.

== Legislative history ==
As of 22 December 2022:

Congress	Short title	Bill number(s)	Date introduced	Sponsor(s)	# of cosponsors	Latest status
112th Congress	Pregnant Workers Fairness Act of 2012	H.R. 5647	May 8, 2012	Jerry Nadler (D-NY)	112	Died in committee
112th Congress	Pregnant Workers Fairness Act of 2012	S. 3565	August 19, 2012	Bob Casey Jr. (D-PA)	9	Died in committee
113th Congress	Pregnant Workers Fairness Act of 2013	H.R. 1975	May 14, 2013	Jerry Nadler (D-NY)	142	Died in committee
113th Congress	Pregnant Workers Fairness Act of 2013	S. 942	May 14, 2013	Bob Casey Jr. (D-PA)	33	Died in committee
114th Congress	Pregnant Workers Fairness Act of 2015	H.R. 2654	June 4, 2015	Jerry Nadler (D-NY)	149	Died in committee
114th Congress	Pregnant Workers Fairness Act of 2015	S. 1512	June 4, 2015	Bob Casey Jr. (D-PA)	31	Died in committee
115th Congress	Pregnant Workers Fairness Act of 2017	H.R. 2417	May 11, 2017	Jerry Nadler (D-NY)	131	Died in committee
115th Congress	Pregnant Workers Fairness Act of 2017	S. 1101	May 11, 2017	Bob Casey Jr. (D-PA)	27	Died in committee
116th Congress	Pregnant Workers Fairness Act of 2019	H.R. 1112	May 14, 2019	Jerry Nadler (D-NY)	241	Passed in the House (329–73).
117th Congress	Pregnant Workers Fairness Act of 2021	H.R. 1065	February 15, 2021	Jerry Nadler (D-NY)	228	Passed in the House (315–101).
117th Congress	Pregnant Workers Fairness Act of 2021	S.1486	April 29, 2021	Bob Casey Jr. (D-PA)	40	Referred to the committees of jurisdiction.

== Provisions ==
Specifically, the bill declares that it is an unlawful employment practice to:

- fail to make reasonable accommodations to known limitations of certain employees unless the accommodation would impose an undue hardship on an entity's business operation;
- require an employee affected by such limitations to accept an accommodation other than any reasonable accommodation arrived at through an interactive process;
- deny employment opportunities based on the need of the entity to make such reasonable accommodations to a qualified employee;
- require such employees to take paid or unpaid leave if another reasonable accommodation can be provided; or
- take adverse action in terms, conditions, or privileges of employment against a qualified employee requesting or using such reasonable accommodations.

== Legal challenge ==
Texas's attorney general Ken Paxton challenged the PWFA along with an additional budget item within the 2023 consolidated budget bill. At the time the bill was passed, the U.S. House of Representatives was operating with allowance for remote voting, a practice developed from the COVID-19 pandemic. Paxton's lawsuit that the passage of the PWFA and the additional budget item were invalid since with the remote votes, there was not a sufficient quorum of representatives present to pass the bill, as set in Article One of the United States Constitution. Judge James Wesley Hendrix of the United States District Court for the Northern District of Texas ruled in February 2024 that while the other budget item could not be challenged, that there was an insufficient quorum for the PWFA to be enacted, issuing an injunction from the law being enforced in Texas.

The ruling was appealed to the United States Court of Appeals for the Fifth Circuit, which ruled in August 2025 that the use of remote voting did not violate the quorum clause, lifting the injunction and allowing PWFA to be enforced in Texas. Cory T. Wilson dissented. In January 2026, the Fifth Circuit vacated its decision after agreeing to rehear the case en banc. In May 2026, the circuit heard the case.

The circuit ruled 9–8 on November 20, 2026 that the usage of proxies to generate a quorum in order to vote within the House of Representatives violated the Quorum Clause, invalidating the PWFA from enforcement in Texas, Mississippi, and Louisiana. The majority said that the law's passage was invalid as "the Quorum Clause does not allow proxies to be included when establishing a quorum".

The dissenting judges said in their opinion that the decision to only block the PWFA from the rest of the bill was illogical, as "There is no explanation offered to explain why, if the entirety of the statute was unconstitutionally passed, this court’s judgment should be limited only to one small sliver of the multitrillion dollar bill." James E. Graves Jr. dissented in the en banc ruling, stating that there was no physical presence requirement within the Quorum Clause.

== See also ==
- List of bills in the 117th United States Congress
- List of bills in the 116th United States Congress
- List of bills in the 115th United States Congress
- List of bills in the 114th United States Congress
- List of bills in the 113th United States Congress
