= Milken Institute School of Public Health =

Graduate school of George Washington University

Coordinates: 38.900694°N 77.050794°W

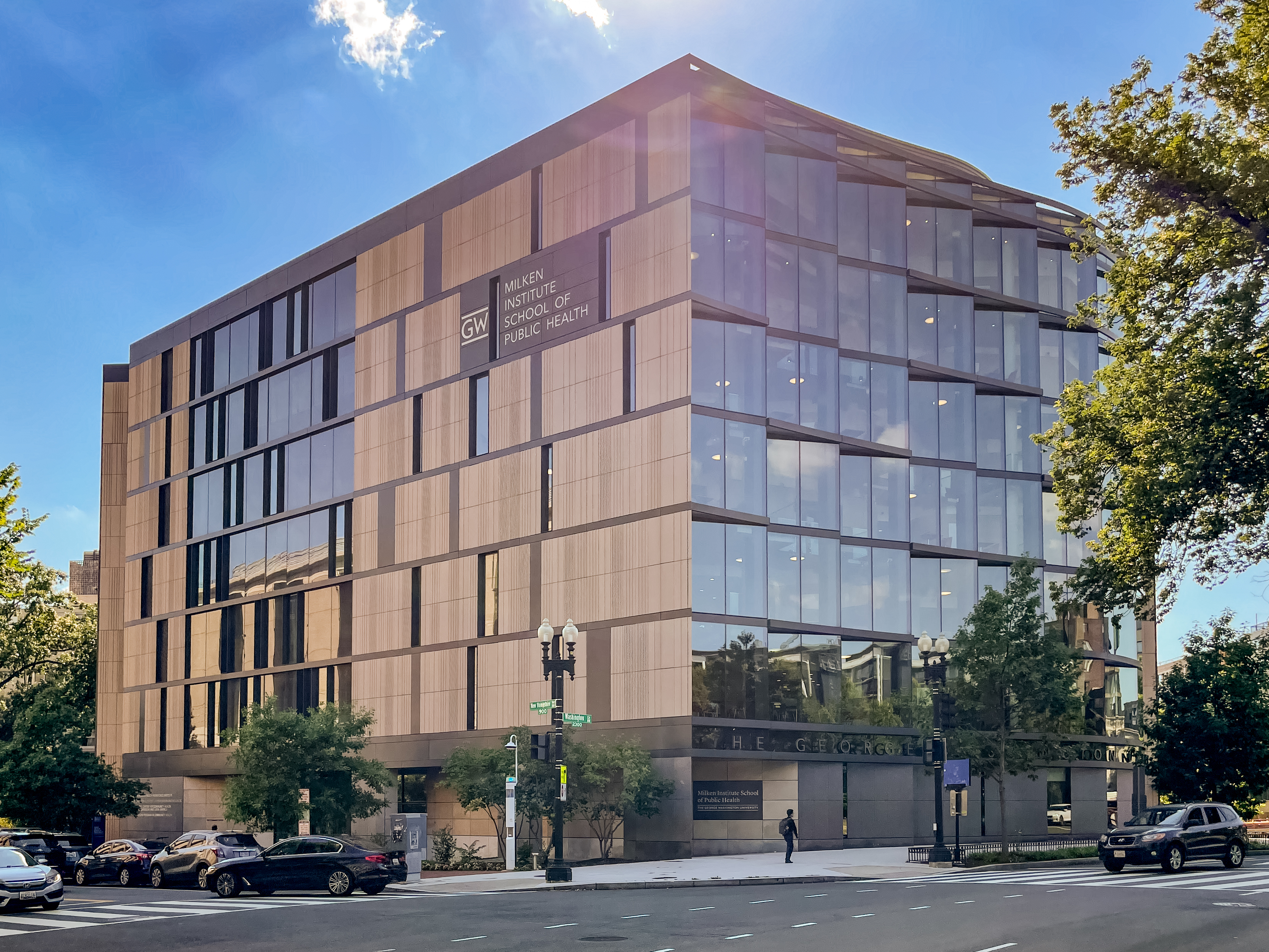
- Type: Private
- Established: 1997
- Parent institution: George Washington University
- Dean: Kelly Gebo, MD, MPH
- Faculty: 327
- Undergraduates: 605
- Postgraduates: 2036
- Doctoral students: 284
- Location: 950 New Hampshire Ave NW, Washington, D.C. 20052
- Campus: Urban — (Foggy Bottom)
- Website: publichealth.gwu.edu

The Milken Institute School of Public Health (also known as Milken Institute SPH, or GWSPH) is the school of public health of George Washington University in Washington, D.C. U.S. News & World Report University Rankings ranks the Milken SPH as the 11th best public health graduate program in the United States.

With over 2,000 graduate students and 600 undergraduate students from nearly every U.S. state and more than 35 nations pursue undergraduate, graduate, and doctoral-level degrees in public health, its student body is one of the most ethnically diverse among the nation's private schools of public health.

== History ==
The George Washington School of Public Health and Health Services was established in July 1997, with Dr. Richard K. Riegelman as the founding dean, bringing together three longstanding university programs in the schools of medicine, business, and education that have since expanded substantially.

On March 11, 2014, the Milken Institute, Sumner Redstone Charitable Foundation, and the Milken Family Foundation donated a combined total of $80 million in three gifts to the renamed Milken Institute School of Public Health (Milken Institute SPH). The gifts also established the Sumner M. Redstone Global Center for Prevention and Wellness.

== Facilities ==
Milken's facilities are located in the George Washington University campus area in Foggy Bottom. The main building is located at 950 New Hampshire Ave. NW, with administrative and research offices, the Himmelfarb Health Sciences Library and other laboratories also located within the area.

SPH's current facilities are:

- Main building (950 New Hampshire Ave.)
- Science and Engineering Hall
- Additional research offices and administrative staff (2175 K Street)
- Library and Medical School Classrooms / Labs at Ross Hall (2300 I Street)
- Public Health Research Clinic (2013 H Street)
- VTSC Exercise Science Lab

== Organization and administration ==
Since October 2025, Milken Institute SPH is led by Michael and Lori Milken Dean, Kelly A. Gebo, MD, MPH.

From 2010 to 2025, Milken Institute SPH was led by Michael and Lori Milken Dean, Lynn R. Goldman.

== Academics ==
The public health programs of the Milken Institute SPH have full accreditation from the Council on Education for Public Health. The program in health services administration is fully accredited by the Commission on Accreditation of Healthcare Management Education. The Athletic Training Education Program is fully accredited by the Commission on Accreditation of Athletic Training Education. The Milken Institute SPH is a member of the Association of Schools of Public Health.

The School offers six different bachelor's degrees, with three minors, 23 Master's degrees and also offers an array of joint degree programs, allowing students to couple a law degree with the Master of Public Health (MPH), or to combine an MPH with a medical degree or an MA in International Affairs. An MPH/Physician Assistant program, the first in the world, is available at the Milken Institute SPH, as is the opportunity to serve as a Peace Corps volunteer while pursuing an MPH. Milken also offers 8 doctoral degrees and different additional certificates. Milken also offers different online master's degrees and certificates.

At Milken each student is assigned an academic advisor, a faculty and / or staff member, who will help develop the individual study plan and guide the student though his time at SPH.

Milken offers practicum projects to students, cooperating with 2500+ partners worldwide.

=== Departments ===
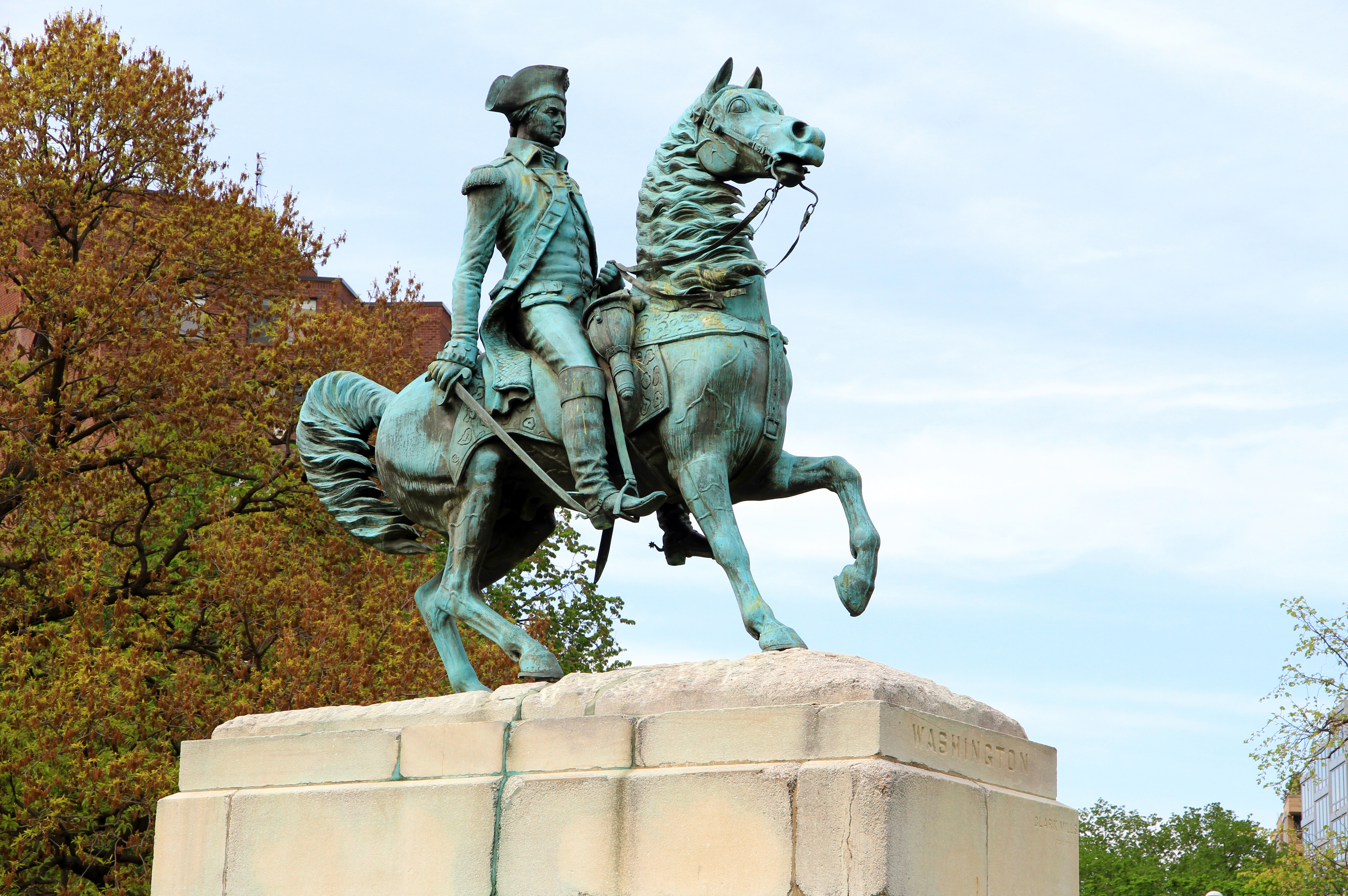
An equestrian statue of George Washington by Clark Mills sits in front of the Milken Institute building

The School has seven academic departments:

- Biostatistics and Bioinformatics
- Environmental and Occupational Health
- Epidemiology
- Exercise and Nutrition Sciences
- Global Health
- Health Policy and Management
- Prevention and Community Health

Within the departments, sixteen specialist centers, institutes, and special programs are sites for state-of-the-art research and training across the many disciplines of public health.

=== Online programs ===
GW Public Health Online programs combine coursework and virtual classes. Coursework in Milken's online graduate programs covers areas such as bio-statistics, epidemiology, cultural competency, and more.

==== Online Master of Public Health Program ====
The Milken Institute School of Public Health and the MPH@GW program are accredited by the Council on Education for Public Health (CEPH). The online MPH degree program prepares public health professionals to make a difference in local, national and global communities. Students can concentrate their electives in the following areas: Epidemiology and Public Health Research Methods, Environmental and Occupational Health, Health Communication, Health Policy, Program Planning and Evaluation, and Global Health. Students can complete the program on a part-time or full-time schedule.

==== One-Year Master of Public Health Program ====
Milken's one-year MPH program requires students to complete 11.5 credits each quarter. The curriculum is the same as the standard MPH program. Students accepted to this track must be approved by the Program Director and are not permitted to work while enrolled.

== Rankings ==
U.S. News & World Report University Rankings ranks the SPH as the 11th best public health graduate program in the United States

== Research ==
The school's current research portfolio is approximately $90 million.

Milken is home to more than 20 Organized Research Units (ORUs), that are established by the school and the GW Office of the Vice Provost for Research.
