= George M. Woodwell =

American ecologist (1928–2024)

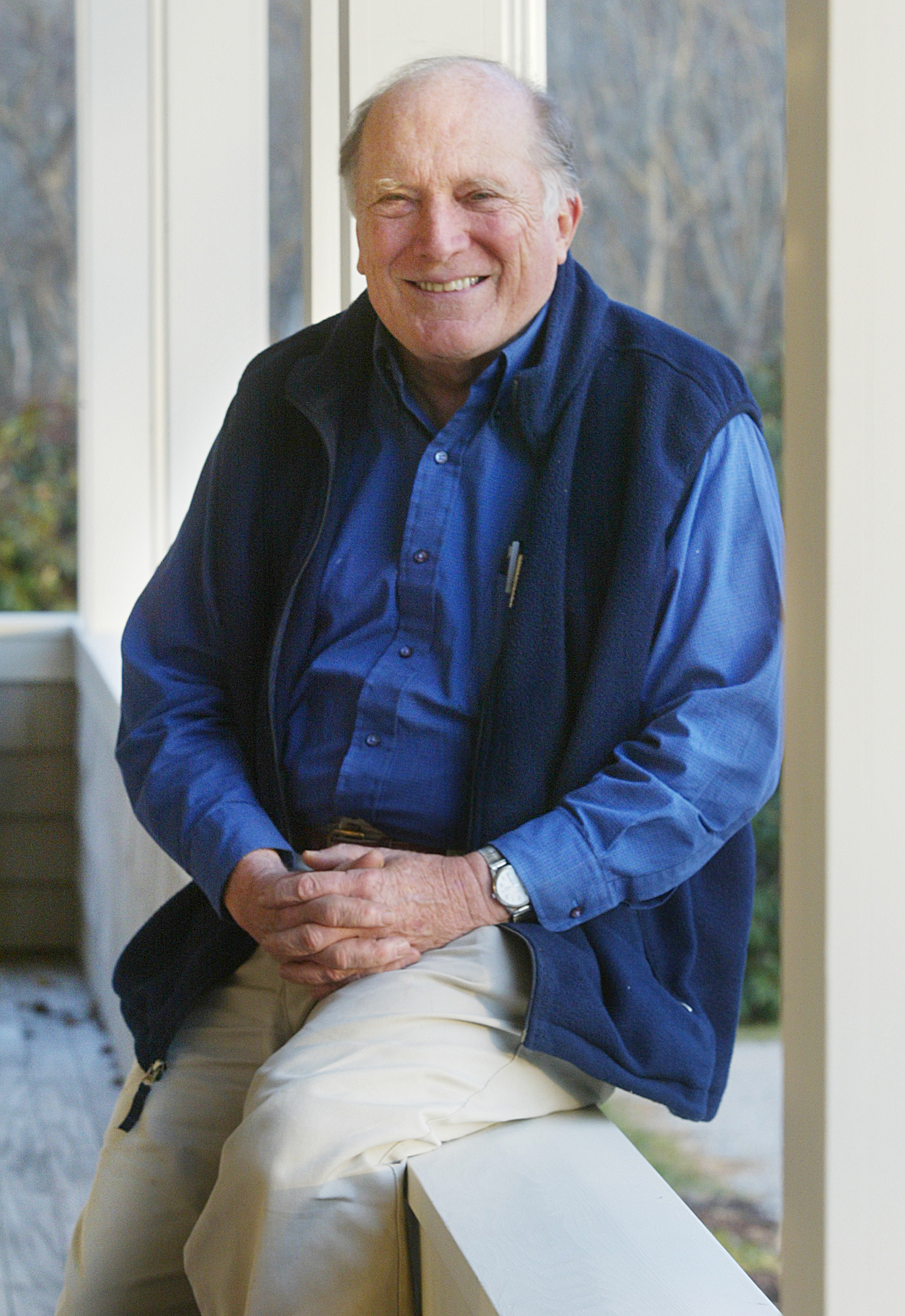
Woodwell in 2004

George Masters Woodwell (October 23, 1928 – June 18, 2024) was an American ecologist. He founded several programs in ecology, first at Brookhaven National Laboratory then at the Marine Biological Laboratory in Woods Hole, Massachusetts, and then at the Woods Hole Research Center, now known as Woodwell Climate Research Center, which he founded in 1985.

Woodwell is best known for his work on the effects of ionizing radiation on forest ecosystems, his work to have the pesticide DDT banned from use in the United States, and his work to call attention to the threat of climate change as a result of combustion of fossil fuels. Woodwell was one of the first scientists to sound the alarm about climate change, testifying before Congress about climate change impacts in 1986.

Woodwell was a founding board member of the Environmental Defense Fund and the Natural Resources Defense Council.

== Early life and education ==
Woodwell was born in Cambridge, Massachusetts to parents who were educators: Philip McIntire Woodwell and Virginia Sellers. He spent his childhood summers on his family's 140-acre farm in York, Maine. He attended the Boston Latin School. He received a bachelor's degree in biology in 1950 from Dartmouth College. He served as a Lt. (j.g.) in the United States Navy from 1950 to 1953. He held a master's degree and a PhD in Botany from Duke University which he received in 1958.

== Career ==
After completing his PhD, Woodwell became a professor of Botany at the University of Maine. He taught there for three years.

In 1961, Woodwell began working at Brookhaven National Laboratory. In a seminal experiment at Brookhaven, Woodwell placed a source of ionizing gamma radiation (Cesium-137, 9500 Curies) at the center of an Pine–oak forest and, over the course of ten years, documented the changes in structure and function of the forest plants. He concluded what is now widely accepted, that organisms with the most sophisticated structure will die first when exposed to chronic stress. Simpler organisms are more resilient to chronic stress. He extrapolated to posit that the results he found in the Long Island forest ecosystem were also true of the global ecosystem: that natural systems will degrade in a predictable pattern when exposed to chronic stress.

Woodwell's research on pesticides focused on DDT where he and fellow scientists were among the first to warn of the harmful effects of DDT on wildlife. That work helped lead to a ban on the use of DDT in the US. It was this group of scientists and lawyers who established the Environmental Defense Fund in 1967 as a result of their work on DDT.

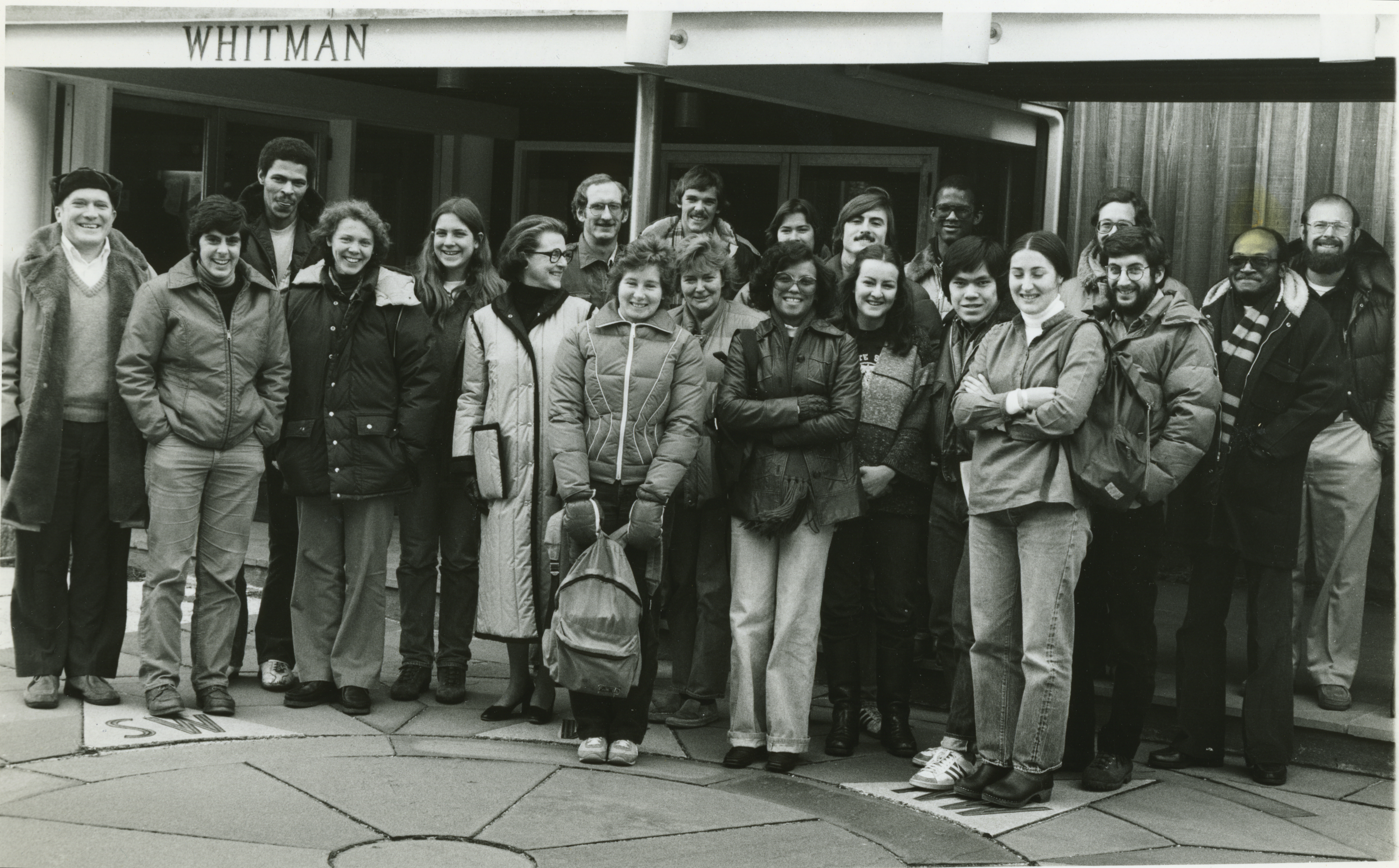
Woodwell with faculty and students at the Marine Biological Laboratory Ecosystems Center in 1980

Woodwell conducted extensive research on carbon budgeting in North American forests and estuaries. He was among the first to recognize that climate change created a positive feedback system: that the warming fed the warming, threatening an increase in the pace of climate change over time. In 1972, Woodwell held a conference, titled Carbon and the Biosphere, at Brookhaven with over 50 biologists, climatologists, and oceanographers. It was the first international gathering to directly address climate change. In 1979, the Carter administration asked Woodwell and four other scientists to create a report on the ecological impact of rising atmospheric carbon dioxide. According to James Gustave Speth, then chairman of the White House Council on Environmental Quality, “The report predicted ‘a warming that will probably be conspicuous within the next 20 years,’ and it called for early action."

In 1970, Woodwell was a founding board member of the Natural Resources Defense Council. In 1982, Woodwell helped found the World Resources Institute.

In 1975, Woodwell started the Ecosystems Center at the Woods Hole Marine Biological Laboratory. In 1985, Woodwell founded the Woods Hole Research Center. He and his staff were instrumental in producing the 1992 United Nations Framework Convention on Climate Change, which was approved by 92 countries at the Earth Summit in Rio de Janeiro.

In 1986, Woodwell testified before Congress about climate change impacts. It was the first ever Congressional hearing on climate change. His testimony detailed the threat of global permafrost thaw and the importance of forests.

== Personal life and death ==
Woodwell and his wife Katharine had four children together. He died at his home in Woods Hole, Massachusetts, on June 18, 2024, at the age of 95.

== Awards and honors ==
Woodwell was made a member of the American Academy of Arts and Sciences in 1980 and a member of the National Academy of Sciences in 1990.

In 1997, Woodwell was awarded the 3rd Annual Heinz Award in the Environment, and in 2001, he was awarded the Volvo Environment Prize.

In 2020, the Woods Hole Research Center was renamed to the Woodwell Climate Research Center to honor Woodwell and to emphasize the scientific focus on climate change.

He is portrayed by Dylan Baker in the 2026 Tom McCarthy film A Statement.

== Books ==
- A World to Live In: An Ecologist's Vision for a Plundered Planet (MIT Press, 2016)
- Nature of a House: Building a World That Works (Island Press, 2009)
- Forests in a Full World (Yale University Press, 2001)
- with Fred T. Mackenzie Biotic Feedbacks in the Global Climatic System: Will the Warming Feed the Warming? (Oxford University Press, 1995)
- with Kilaparti Ramakrishna World Forests for the Future: Their Use and Conservation (Yale University Press, 1993)
- The Earth in Transition: Patterns and Processes of Biotic Impoverishment (Cambridge University Press, 1991)
