= Woodwell Climate Research Center =

American scientific research organization

Coordinates: 41.5495°N 70.6435°W

- Founded: 1985 (41 years ago)
- Type: Nonprofit scientific research organization
- Purpose: Climate Change
- Headquarters: Woods Hole, Falmouth, Massachusetts, United States
- Region served: Global
- President and CEO: Robert Max Holmes
- Key people: George Woodwell, Robert Max Holmes, Philip Duffy, John Holdren
- Employees: 120
- Website: woodwellclimate.org

Woodwell Climate Research Center, formerly known as the Woods Hole Research Center (WHRC) until August 2020, is a scientific research organization that studies climate change impacts and solutions. The International Center for Climate Governance named WHRC the world's top climate change think tank for 2013, 2014, 2015, and 2016.

Woodwell Climate conducts research on the causes and impacts of climate change throughout the tropics, the Arctic, and North America. The Center designs all of its work to inform policy or answer policy questions and is composed of five core units: Arctic, Carbon, Risk, Tropics, and Water.

== History ==
The Woods Hole Research Center was established in 1985 in Woods Hole, Massachusetts by George Woodwell. WHRC was one of the first organizations dedicated to fighting global climate change, and Woodwell testified to Congress in 1986 about the dangers of sea level rise and global warming.

The plan for developing the United Nations Framework Convention on Climate Change was drafted at the Woods Hole Research Center in the late 1980s by Woodwell and Kilaparti Ramakrishna. In 2005, John P. Holdren became the director and he continued to lead the organization until he was appointed as President Obama's science advisor in 2009. Holdren returned to WHRC as a senior advisor in 2017 after President Obama left office.

In 2020, the Center was renamed to the Woodwell Climate Research Center to emphasize the scientific focus on climate change and honor the founder, George Woodwell.

The organization's current president is Robert Max Holmes, an earth scientist who has co-founded and led multiple large river research networks, including Global Rivers Observatory, Arctic Great Rivers Observatory, Cape Cod Rivers Observatory, and Science on the Fly, an initiative that unites the fly-fishing and science communities to study and protect rivers around the world. Woodwell Climate has about 120 staff members.

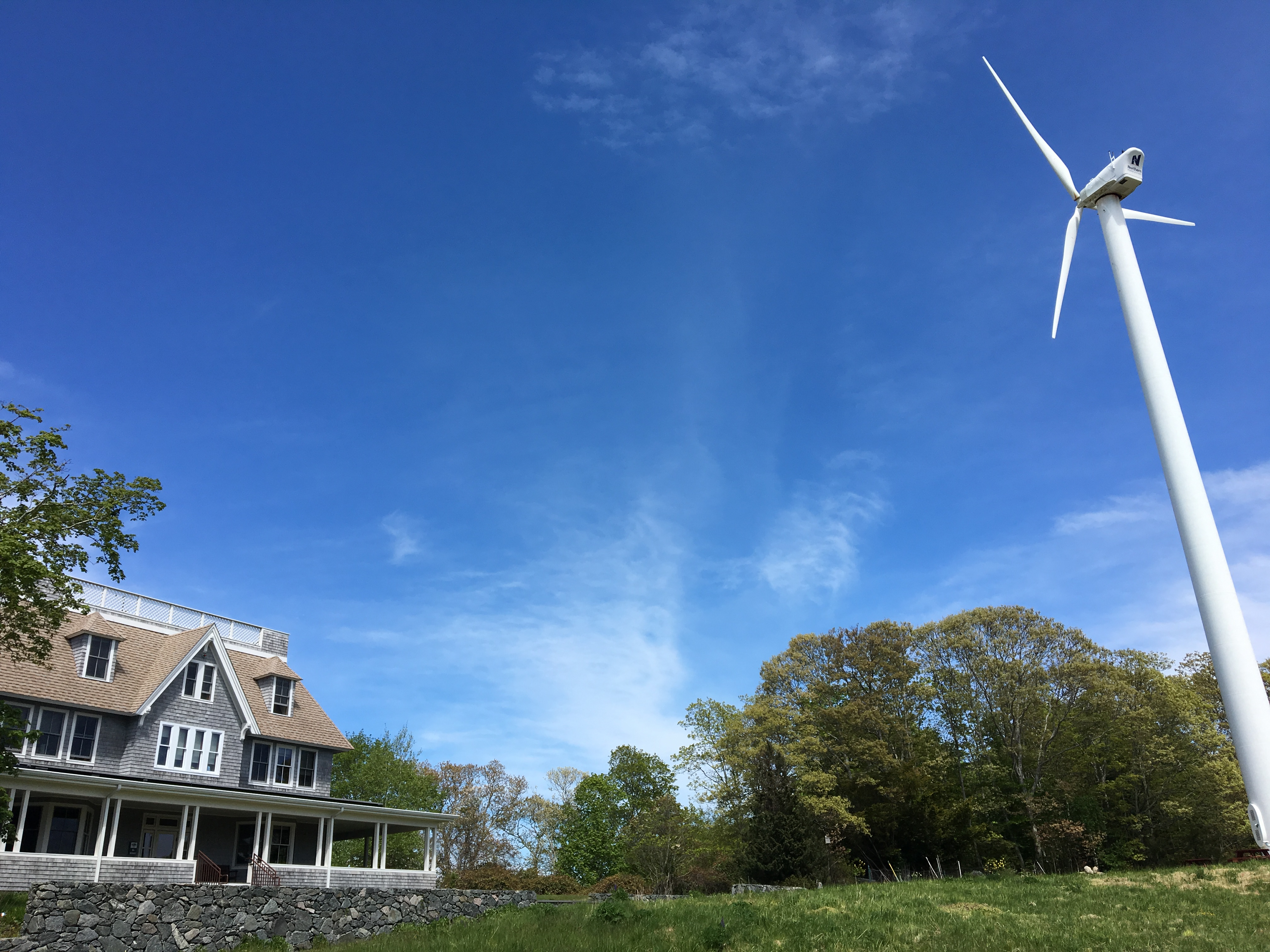
The Woodwell Climate Research Center headquarters in Falmouth, MA

The Center's Gilman Ordway Campus, located on Cape Cod in the town of Falmouth, was completed in 2003. The 19,300 sq ft (1,790 m^{2}) building is composed of a renovated summer estate (ca. 1877) and a new wing. The campus is energy neutral, with renewable power generated by a 100 kW wind turbine, as well as rooftop photo-voltaic power systems.

In 2023, Woodwell received a $5 million grant and fellowship from Google.org, the philanthropic arm of Google, to develop an open-access resource that will use satellite data and artificial intelligence in order to track Arctic permafrost thaw in near real-time.

== Awards ==
The International Center for Climate Governance has named Woodwell as the world's top climate change think tank for four years in a row—2013, 2014, 2015, and 2016. The award is based on quantitative and analytical data, including activities, publications and dissemination.
