= Aisha Nyandoro =

- Born: 1978/1979 (age 46–47); Mississippi, U.S.
- Education: Tennessee State University; Michigan State University
- Organization(s): Springboard to Opportunities; Magnolia Mother's Trust
- Website: aishanyandorospeaks.com

Aisha Nyandoro (born 1978/1979) is the founder and CEO of Springboard to Opportunities, a Mississippi-based nonprofit working to end generational poverty.

== Early life and education ==
Nyandoro grew up in Mississippi. She earned a B.A. in psychology from Tennessee State University, and an M.A. and Ph.D. in Community Psychology from Michigan State University.

== Career ==
In 2013, Nyandoro co-founded Springboard to Opportunities, a Jackson, Mississippi-based nonprofit organization supporting families living in subsidized affordable housing.

Through Springboard to Opportunities, Nyandoro launched the Magnolia Mother's Trust, a guaranteed income program for Black mothers. Founded in 2018, the Trust was the first program of its kind in the U.S. As of 2022, it is the longest-running guaranteed income program in the U.S.

== Honors and recognition (selected) ==
- 2015: Aspen Institute Ascend Fellow
- 2022: John P. McNulty Prize
- 2023: Ashoka Fellow
- 2024: TIME 100 Next list
- 2024: Heinz Award for the Economy
