= Lynn Goldman =

American academic

- Born: April 24, 1951 (age 75); Galveston, Texas
- Education: University of California at Berkeley (B.Sc. and M.Sc.); Johns Hopkins Bloomberg School of Public Health (MPH); University of California (MD)
- Occupations: Public health physician; Pediatrician; Epidemiologist
- Known for: Dean of the Milken Institute School of Public Health
- Awards: Heinz Award (2009)
- Honours: Dr. (h.c.) by Örebro University

Lynn R. Goldman (born April 24, 1951) is the Dean of the Milken Institute School of Public Health at George Washington University. She is an American public health physician, a pediatrician and an epidemiologist.

== Early life and education ==
Goldman was born in Galveston, Texas, United States. She graduated with a B.Sc. in Conservation of Natural Resources from the University of California at Berkeley, Berkeley College of Natural Resources, in 1976 and subsequently obtained an M.Sc. in Health and Medical Science in 1979.

In 1981, she received an MPH from the Johns Hopkins Bloomberg School of Public Health (formerly Johns Hopkins University School of Hygiene and Public Health) and an MD from the University of California in the same year.

== Career ==
In 1993, Goldman was appointed by President Bill Clinton and confirmed by the US Senate as Assistant Administrator for Toxic Substances at the US Environmental Protection Agency, becoming the first physician to serve in this capacity. During her five years at the EPA, from 1993 to 1998, she promoted pesticide legislation reform, assessment of industrial-chemical hazards, and children's health issues.

Formerly a professor of environmental health at the Bloomberg School of Public Health she is perhaps best known for her role in helping craft the Food Protection Act passed by Congress in 1996, the first national environmental law to explicitly require measures to protect children from pesticides.

Goldman is frequently asked to advise and testify in matters regarding her areas of expertise. She is also regularly asked to comment on developments in her fields on national media.

== Memberships ==
Goldman has served on numerous national boards and expert committees including the Committee on Environmental Health of the American Academy of Pediatrics, the Centers for Disease Control Lead Poisoning Prevention Advisory Committee and the National Research Council. She also serves on the Food and Drug Administration's (FDA) Science Board and has served on different subcommittees. Goldman formerly served as chair of the board of the Children's Environmental Health Network.

She is a member of the National Academy of Medicine (NAM), and serves on the Board of Governors of the National Academy of Sciences (NAS). Goldman also serves as a member of the National Academy of Medicine Council and of the Advisory Committee to the Director of the U.S. Center for Disease Control and Prevention.

== Works ==
Goldman has published various scientific articles and written for blogs like The Hill.

== Awards and recognitions ==
In 2009, Goldman received the 16th Annual Heinz Award with a special focus on global change. She was also recognized as one of Maryland's Top 100 Women in the same year.

Goldman received an honorary doctorate degree from the Swedish Örebro University and has also received different Alumni awards.

In 2016, Goldman received the Walsh McDermott Award for distinguished service to the National Academy of Medicine, recognizing her more than 30-year-history of volunteering.

In 2018, Goldman was nominated as a member of the Johns Hopkins Society of Scholars.
