= Joan Kleypas =

Marine scientist

Joan Ann Kleypas
- Born: July 20, 1957 (age 69); Jefferson County, Texas
- Education: James Cook University
- Scientific career
- Thesis: Geological development of fringing reefs in the southern Great Barrier Reef, Australia (1991)
- Doctoral advisor: David Hopley

Joan Ann ("Joanie") Kleypas is a marine scientist known for her work on the impact of ocean acidification and climate change on coral reefs, and for advancing solutions to environmental problems caused by climate change.

== Education and career ==
Kleypas has a B.S. in Marine Biology from Lamar University (1979), an M.S. in Marine Science from the University of South Carolina (1981), and a Ph.D. from James Cook University (1991). Kleypas is currently a Senior Scientist at the National Center for Atmospheric Research.

In her work on ocean acidification, Kleypas has worked at an environmental consulting firm, led national meetings on the topic, worked with groups on publications from the National Academy of Sciences on ocean acidification, and contributed to sections of the Intergovernmental Panel on Climate Change report. Kleypas has briefed members of the House of Representatives on the impact of ocean acidification on marine life, and has testified before multiple United States' government committees including the House Subcommittee on Fisheries, Wildlife, and Oceans (2007), the House of Representatives Select Committee on Energy Independence and Global Warming (2008), and the House of Representatives Committee on Science and Technology, Subcommittee on Energy and Environment (2008). In addition to her research on ocean acidification and coral reefs, Kleypas actively presents actions that are needed to save coral reefs and the conditions that would improve the ability of coral reefs to survive. These actions led Mother Jones to highlight her in 2012 as one of the women defending ecosystems on the planet.

Kleypas uses multiple venues to engage the general public including serving as a scientific advisor for the Netflix movie, Chasing Coral, and founding a coral reef restoration project in Costa Rica Kleypas is one of the scientists highlighted in Nancy Baron's book, Escape from the Ivory Tower, which describes how scientists can share their research with the general public.

== Research ==
Kleypas' early research used sea surface temperature measured with satellites to define water circulation patterns in the Great Barrier Reef. She used modeling to estimate the extent of the reef habitat since the Last Glacial Maximum and under future climate scenarios. This research includes defining the environmental limits on where coral reefs can exist which has implications for the response of coral reefs to future climate change. Kleypas also examines how the physiology of some reef organisms will limit their ability to expand their geographic range.

In 1999, Kleypas published a paper in Science ("Geochemical consequences of increased atmospheric carbon dioxide on reefs") which was the first to indicate that increases in carbon dioxide in the ocean will reduce the ability of coral reefs to build new carbonate skeletons. This research was a key component in discussions on how the ocean, especially coral reefs, will respond to future climate change.

In 2008, Kleypas's research revealed that the western Pacific warm pool is warming less than other parts of the global ocean and corals there are experiencing fewer bleaching events, research that was covered in the press because it was a piece of potential good news with respect to the state of coral reefs in the Pacific.

=== Selected publications ===
- Kleypas, J. A. (1999-04-02). "Geochemical Consequences of Increased Atmospheric Carbon Dioxide on Coral Reefs". Science. 284 (5411): 118–120. Bibcode:1999Sci...284..118K. doi:10.1126/science.284.5411.118. PMID 10102806.
- Kleypas, Joan A.; Yates, Kimberly K. (2009). "Coral Reefs and Ocean Acidification". Oceanography. 22 (4): 108–117. Bibcode:2009Ocgpy..22d.108K. doi:10.5670/oceanog.2009.101. ISSN 1042-8275. JSTOR 24861028.
- Doney, Scott C.; Fabry, Victoria J.; Feely, Richard A.; Kleypas, Joan A. (2009-01-01). "Ocean Acidification: The Other CO2 Problem". Annual Review of Marine Science. 1 (1): 169–192. Bibcode:2009ARMS....1..169D. doi:10.1146/annurev.marine.010908.163834. ISSN 1941-1405. PMID 21141034.

== Awards ==
- Kavli Frontiers of Science (2007)
- Aldo Leopold Leadership Fellow (2008)
- Rachel Carson Lecture, American Geophysical Union (2009)
- Heinz Award for the Environment (2011)
- Fellow, American Association for the Advancement of Science (2019)
- Eminence in Research award from the International Coral Reef Society (2020)
