= Donald Wuebbles =

Atmospheric sciences professor

Donald Wuebbels
- Donald James Wuebbels
- Education: University of California at Davis
- Spouse: Barbara
- Children: Three sons, five grandchildren
- Awards: 2005 Stratospheric Ozone Protection Award from the United States Environmental Protection Agency, 2014 Cleveland Abbe Award from the American Meteorological Society
- Scientific career
- Fields: Atmospheric science
- Workplaces: University of Illinois at Urbana–Champaign
- Thesis: A Theoretical Analysis of the Past Variations in Global Atmospheric Composition and Temperature Structure (1983)

Donald James Wuebbles is the Harry E. Preble Endowed Professor in the Department of Atmospheric Sciences at the University of Illinois at Urbana–Champaign. He was formerly the head of this department from 1994 to 2006, and was the founding director of the University of Illinois' School of Earth, Society, and Environment from 2006 to 2008. He is a fellow of the American Association for the Advancement of Science, the American Geophysical Union, and the American Meteorological Society. He has been a Coordinating Lead Author and contributor for the Intergovernmental Panel on Climate Change's reports.
