= Ensuring Lasting Smiles Act =

- Long title: To provide health insurance benefits for outpatient and inpatient items and services related to the diagnosis and treatment of a congenital anomaly or birth defect.
- Announced in: the 117th United States Congress
- Number of co-sponsors: 303

Legislative history
- Introduced in the House of Representatives as H.R. 1916 by Anna Eshoo (D–CA) on March 16, 2021; Committee consideration by Energy and Commerce, Ways and Means and Education and Labor

The Ensuring Lasting Smiles Act (ELSA) is a proposed United States law that would require private health insurance plans to cover diagnosis and treatment of congenital anomalies and birth defects. The bill is considered strong and bi-partisan in both houses of Congress.

The bill was considered stalled as of March 2024, and continued to be considered by the 2025 119th United States Congress.

== Legislative history ==
As of 15 December 2022:

Congress	Short title	Bill number(s)	Date introduced	Sponsor(s)	# of cosponsors	Latest status
115th Congress	Ensuring Lasting Smiles Act	H.R. 6689	August 28, 2018	Collin Peterson (D-MN)	16	Died in committee
115th Congress	Ensuring Lasting Smiles Act	S. 3369	August 23, 2018	Tammy Baldwin (D-WI)	7	Died in committee
116th Congress	Ensuring Lasting Smiles Act	H.R. 1379	February 26, 2019	Collin Peterson (D-MN)	313	Died in committee
116th Congress	Ensuring Lasting Smiles Act	S. 560	February 26, 2019	Tammy Baldwin (D-WI)	53	Died in committee
117th Congress	Ensuring Lasting Smiles Act	H.R. 1916	February 2, 2021	Anna Eshoo (D-CA)	317	Referred to Committees of Energy and Commerce, Ways and Means and Education and Labor. Passed the US House (310-110) on April 4, 2022.
117th Congress	Ensuring Lasting Smiles Act	S. 754	February 1, 2021	Tammy Baldwin (D-WI)	61	Referred to Committee of Health, Education, Labor and Pensions

== See also ==
- List of bills in the 115th United States Congress
- List of bills in the 116th United States Congress
- List of bills in the 117th United States Congress
