= Farm Workforce Modernization Act =

Proposed legislation

- Long title: To amend the Immigration and Nationality Act to provide for terms and conditions for nonimmigrant workers performing agricultural labor or services, and for other purposes.
- Announced in: the 119th United States Congress
- Number of co-sponsors: 5

Legislative history
- Introduced in the House of Representatives as H.R. 3227 by Zoe Lofgren (D–CA) on May 7, 2025; Committee consideration by House Judiciary, House Ways and Means, Education and Labor and Financial Services

The Farm Workforce Modernization Act is a proposed United States law that would grant legal status to certain illegal immigrants who have performed at least 1,035 hours (or 180 workdays) of agricultural labor in the United States over the prior two years, allowing them to remain and work legally if they meet background and eligibility requirements. It establishes a “certified agricultural worker” status valid for 5.5 years, which can be renewed with continued farm work and can lead to lawful permanent residence after several additional years of agricultural employment and payment of fees.

The current version of the bill for the 119th United States Congress was introduced on May 7, 2025 by a group of 3 Democrats and 3 Republicans led by Zoe Lofgren and Dan Newhouse.

== Background ==
The bill was first introduced in the 116th United States Congress and reintroduced in the 117th United States Congress and the 118th United States Congress.

The House has passed it twice: first in a 260–165 vote on December 11, 2019, and then in a 247–174 vote on March 18, 2021.

The current bill has the support of the United Farm Workers agricultural labor union and the editorial board of The Bakersfield Californian.

== Provisions ==
The bill sets forth criteria for an individual, and his or her spouse and/or children to become a certified agricultural worker, and later petition for permanent lawful resident status.

=== Temporary status for Certified Agricultural Workers ===
Anyone who meets all of the requirements of one of the two sets of criteria will be eligible for temporary status as a certified agricultural worker.

Principal Aliens

- Performed agricultural labor or services in the United States for at least 1,035 hours (or 180 workdays) during the 2-year period preceding the date of the introduction of the act
- On the date of the introduction of this Act is either inadmissible or deportable from the United States or is under a grant of deferred enforced departure or has temporary protected status under section 244 of the Immigration and Nationality Act.
- Has been continuously present in the United States since the date of the introduction of the act, until the date on which the alien is granted certified agricultural worker status
- Is not otherwise ineligible for certified agricultural worker status

Dependent Spouse and Children

- Certified agricultural dependent status may be granted to the spouse or child of an alien granted certified agricultural worker status under paragraph, if the spouse or child is not ineligible for certified agricultural dependent status.

Grounds of Inadmissibility

- An alien is ineligible for certified agricultural worker or certified agricultural dependent status if it is determined that the alien is inadmissible under section 212(a) of the Immigration and Nationality Act, except that in determining inadmissibility

Additional Criminal Bars

- An alien is ineligible for certified agricultural worker or certified agricultural dependent status if it is determined that, excluding any offense under State law for which an essential element is the alien's immigration status and any minor traffic offense, the alien has been convicted of - any felony offense - an aggravated felony as defined in the Immigration and Nationality Act at the time of the conviction, - has two misdemeanor offenses involving moral turpitude, as described in the Immigration and Nationality Act, unless an offense is waived by the Secretary of Agriculture -has three or more misdemeanor offenses not occurring on the same date, and not arising out of the same act, omission, or scheme of misconduct.

Extensions of Certified Status

The requirements for an extensions of the status is as follows.

Principal Aliens

The Secretary of agriculture may extend certified agricultural worker status for additional periods of 51/2 years to an alien who submits a completed application, including the required processing fees, within the 120-day period beginning 60 days before the expiration of the fifth year of the immediately preceding grant of certified agricultural worker status, if the alien

-has performed agricultural labor or services in the United States for at least 575 hours (or 100 workdays) for each of the prior 5 years in which the alien held certified agricultural worker status; and

-has not become ineligible for certified agricultural worker status under section 101(b).

Dependent Spouse and Children

The Secretary may grant or extend certified agricultural dependent status to the spouse or child of an alien granted an extension of certified agricultural worker status under paragraph if the spouse or child is not ineligible for certified agricultural dependent status.

Waiver for Late Filings

The Secretary may waive an alien's failure to timely file before the expiration of the 120-day period if the alien demonstrates that the delay was due to extraordinary circumstances beyond the alien's control or for other good cause.

=== Optional Earned Residence For Long-Term Workers ===
A certified agricultural worker and his her or her spouse and/or children may have there status adjusted to permanent lawful resident if they meet criteria as follows.

Principal Aliens

The Secretary may adjust the status of an alien from that of a certified agricultural worker to that of a lawful permanent resident if the alien submits a completed application, including the required processing and penalty fees, and the Secretary determines that.

-the alien performed agricultural labor or services for not less than 575 hours (or 100 workdays) each year— or at least 10 years prior to the date of the enactment of this Act and for at least 4 years in certified agricultural worker status or fewer than 10 years prior to the date of the enactment of this Act and for at least 8 years in certified agricultural worker status.

-the alien has not become ineligible for certified agricultural worker status.

Dependent Aliens

The spouse and each child of an alien whose status has been adjusted to that of a lawful permanent resident may also be granted lawful permanent residence if

-the qualifying relationship to the principal alien existed on the date on which such alien was granted adjustment of status, and the spouse or child is not ineligible for certified agricultural worker dependent status.

Protections for Spouses and Children

The Secretary of Homeland Security shall establish procedures to allow the spouse or child of a certified agricultural worker to self-petition for lawful permanent residence in cases involving

-the death of the certified agricultural worker, so long as the spouse or child submits a petition not later than 2 years after the date of the worker's death.

-the spouse or a child are being battered or subjected to extreme cruelty by the certified agricultural worker.

Documentation of Work History

An applicant for adjustment of status shall not be required to resubmit evidence of work history that has been previously submitted to the Secretary in connection with an approved extension of certified agricultural worker status.

== Legislative history ==
As of June 12, 2025:

Congress	Short title	Bill number(s)	Date introduced	Sponsor(s)	# of cosponsors	Latest status
116th Congress	Farm Workforce Modernization Act of 2019	H.R. 5038	November 12, 2019	Zoe Lofgren(D-CA)	62	Passed in the House (260 - 165).
116th Congress	Farm Workforce Modernization Act of 2019	H.R. 4916	October 30, 2019	Zoe Lofgren(D-CA)	46	Died in Committee
117th Congress	Farm Workforce Modernization Act of 2021	H.R. 1537	March 3, 2021	Zoe Lofgren(D-CA)	3	Referred to Committees on Judiciary, Ways and Means, Education and Labor and Financial Services
117th Congress	Farm Workforce Modernization Act of 2021	H.R. 1603	March 8, 2021	Zoe Lofgren(D-CA)	61	Passed in the House (247-174).
118th Congress	Farm Workforce Modernization Act of 2023	H.R. 4319	June 23, 2023	Zoe Lofgren(D-CA)	17	Referred to Committees of Jurisdiction
119th Congress	Farm Workforce Modernization Act of 2025	H.R. 3227	May 7, 2025	Zoe Lofgren(D-CA)	5	Referred to Committees of Jurisdiction

=== See also ===
- List of bills in the 116th United States Congress
- List of bills in the 117th United States Congress
