= Bipartisan Background Checks Act =

Proposed United States legislation

- Long title: To require a background check for every firearm sale.
- Announced in: the 117th United States Congress
- Number of co-sponsors: 210

Legislative history
- Introduced in the House of Representatives as H.R. 8 by Mike Thompson (D–CA) on March 1, 2021; Committee consideration by House Committee on Education and Labor; Passed the House on March 11, 2021 (227–203)

The Bipartisan Background Checks Act was a proposed United States law that would establish new background check requirements for firearm transfers between private parties. It would prohibit a firearm transfer between private parties until a licensed gun dealer, manufacturer, or importer conducts a successful background check.

== Background ==
=== Gun violence in the United States ===
Gun violence in the United States results in tens of thousands of deaths and injuries annually. In 2018, the most recent year for which data is available as of 2021, the Centers for Disease Control and Prevention's (CDC's) National Center for Health Statistics reported 38,390 deaths by firearm, of which 24,432 were by suicide, and 13,958 were homicides. The rate of firearm deaths per 100,000 people rose from 10.3 per 100,000 in 1999 to 12 per 100,000 in 2017, with 109 people dying per day; the figure was 11.9 per 100,000 in 2018. In 2010, there were 19,392 firearm-related suicides, and 11,078 firearm-related homicides in the U.S. In 2010, 358 murders were reported involving a rifle, while 6,009 were reported involving a handgun; another 1,939 were reported with an unspecified type of firearm.

== Provisions ==
=== Background check requirements ===
This bill establishes new background check requirements for firearm transfers between private parties (i.e., individuals who are not federally licensed as gun professionals). Specifically, it prohibits a firearm transfer between private parties unless a licensed gun dealer, manufacturer, or importer first takes possession of the firearm while conducting a background check. The prohibition does not apply to certain firearm transfers, such as a gift between spouses in good faith.

== Legislative history ==
As of March 12, 2021:

Congress	Short title	Bill number(s)	Date introduced	Sponsor(s)	# of cosponsors	Latest status
116th Congress	Bipartisan Background Checks Act of 2019	H.R. 8	January 8, 2019	Mike Thompson(D-CA)	232	Passed in the House (240–190).
116th Congress	Background Check Expansion Act of 2019	S. 42	January 8, 2019	Chris Murphy (D-CT)	41	Died in Committee.
117th Congress	Bipartisan Background Checks Act of 2021	H.R. 8	March 1, 2021	Mike Thompson(D-CA)	210	Passed in the House (227–203).
117th Congress	Background Check Expansion Act of 2021	S. 529	March 3, 2021	Chris Murphy (D-CT)	45	Referred to Committees of Jurisdiction.
118th Congress	Bipartisan Background Checks Act of 2023	H.R. 715	February 1, 2023	Brian Fitzpatrick (R-PA)	209	Died in Committee.
118th Congress	Background Check Expansion Act	S. 494	February 16, 2023	Chris Murphy (D-CT)	48	Died in Committee.
119th Congress	Bipartisan Background Checks Act of 2025	H.R. 18	June 10, 2025	Mike Thompson(D-CA)	212	Referred to Committees of Jurisdiction.
119th Congress	Background Check Expansion Act	S. 3214	November 19, 2025	Chris Murphy (D-CT)	46	Referred to Committees of Jurisdiction.

== See also ==
- Gun law in the United States
- List of bills in the 116th United States Congress
- List of bills in the 117th United States Congress
