= Safeguarding Therapeutics Act =

U.S. federal law

- Long title: To amend the Federal Food, Drug, and Cosmetic Act to give authority to the Secretary of Health and Human Services, acting through the Commissioner of Food and Drugs, to destroy counterfeit devices.
- Enacted by: the 116th United States Congress

Citations
- Public law: Pub. L. 116–304 (text) (PDF)

Codification
- Titles amended: 21 U.S.C. 381(a)); 21 U.S.C. 321(h))

Legislative history
- Introduced in the House as H.R. 5663 by Rep. Brett Guthrie (R-KY), Rep. Charles Engel (D-NY) on 1/21/2020; Committee consideration by House Committee on Energy and Commerce; Passed the House on 9/21/2020; Passed the Senate on 12/8/2020; Signed into law by President Donald Trump on 1/5/2021

The Safeguarding Therapeutics Act is a U.S. federal law that was passed by Congress in 2020 that allows the government to destroy counterfeit medical devices.

== Background ==
One of the growing problems for public health and safety in the United States has been the increase in counterfeit prescription drugs being smuggled into the U.S. by individuals and criminal groups. To combat this, the government tries to intercept counterfeit drugs, and when they do, the Food and Drug Administration (FDA) has the legal authority to deny entry and destroy them via the 2012 Food and Drug Administration Safety and Innovation Act, which gave the FDA the ability to seize and destroy counterfeit drugs.

The proliferation of counterfeit medical devices and supplies, on the other hand, caused growing concern. Before the Safeguarding Therapeutics Act was signed into law, the FDA lacked the legal authority to intercept and destroy counterfeit medical devices.

According to the Partnership for Safe Medicines, "Since the onset of the pandemic, U.S. law enforcement have been reporting a proliferation of shipments containing fake cures, vaccines and testing kits." Counterfeit glucose tests, blood pressure cuffs and syringes were also making their way into the country.

Even counterfeit EpiPens, which are emergency life-savings devices for people with severe allergies, were finding their way into the U.S., noted U.S. Senator Maggie Hassan (D-NH), a sponsor of the Senate version of the bill.

== What it does ==
When introducing the bill, sponsors Brett Guthrie (R-KY) and Charles Engel (D-NY) noted the volume of counterfeit medical devices coming through the International Mail Facility at John F. Kennedy Airport. They noted that the threat posed by these devices to public health, as well as counterfeit COVID-19 vaccines, spurred them to write the legislation.

Before the law was passed, any counterfeit devices being imported into the U.S. discovered by the government could be re-exported, finding its way back into the supply chain. The Safeguarding Therapeutics Act gives the FDA authority and a mandate to destroy counterfeits.

== Legislative history ==
Guthrie and Engel introduced the bill, H.R. 5663, during the 116th Congress on January 21, 2020. In the Senate, Sens. Mike Enzi and Maggie Hassan introduced a companion bill, S. 4225.

The House bill was referred to the House Committee on Energy and Commerce, which held a hearing on the bill. The committee approved the legislation and the full U.S. House passed the bill on September 21. The Senate passed it on December 8. On January 5, 2021, President Trump signed the bill, and it became Public Law 116–304.
