= List of bills in the 117th United States Congress =

117th United States Congress
| ← | 116th | 118th | → |
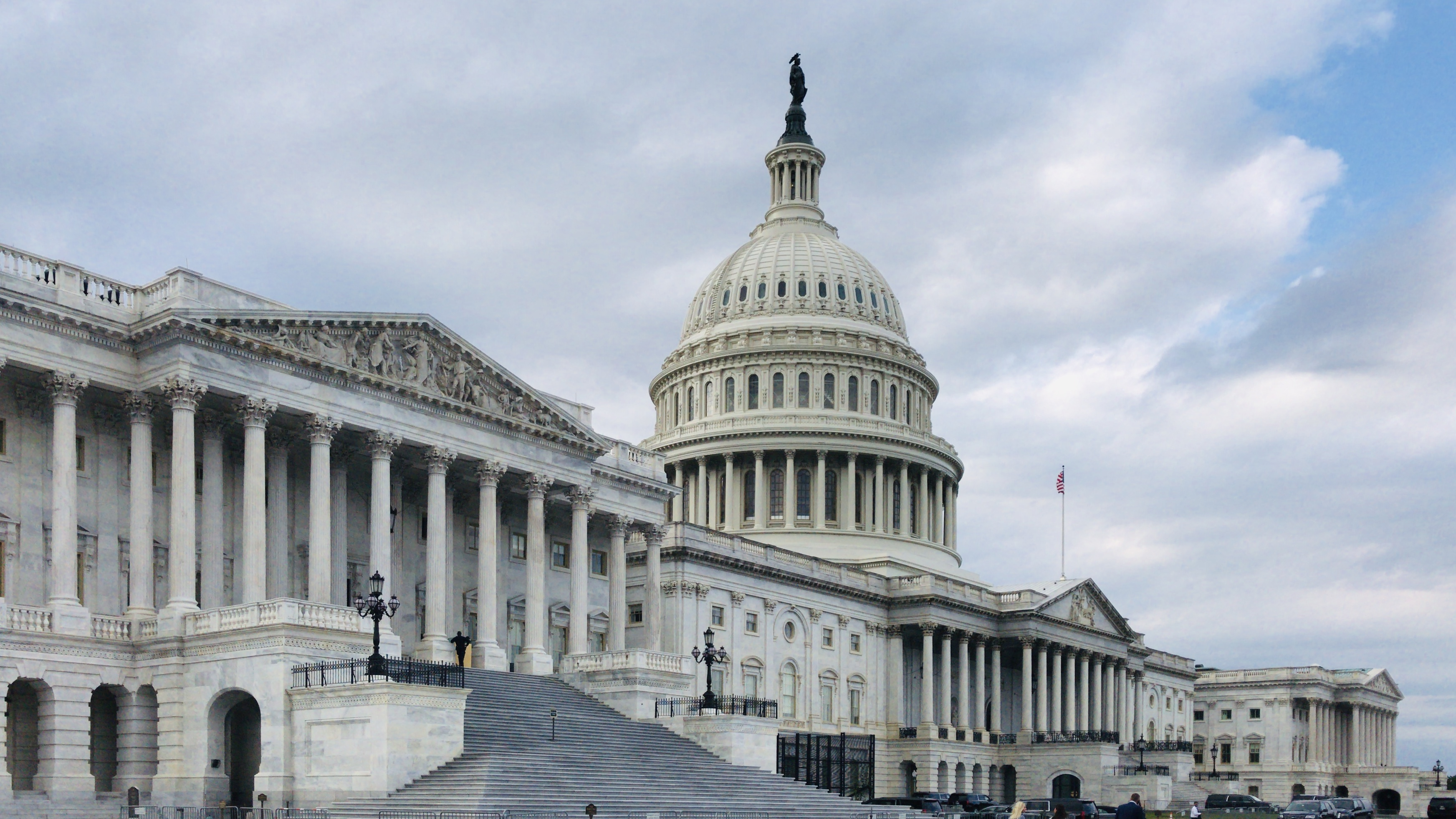
- United States Capitol (2020)

Overview
- Legislative body: United States Congress
- Jurisdiction: United States
- Term: January 3, 2021 – January 3, 2023

Senate
- Members: 100
- President: Mike Pence (R) (until January 20, 2021); Kamala Harris (D) (from January 20, 2021)
- Party control: Republican (until January 20, 2021); Democratic (from January 20, 2021)

House of Representatives
- Members: 435 representatives 6 non-voting delegates
- Speaker: Nancy Pelosi (D)
- Party control: Democratic

Sessions
- 1st: January 3, 2021 – January 3, 2022
- 2nd: January 3, 2022 – January 3, 2023

The bills of the 117th United States Congress list includes proposed federal laws that were introduced in the 117th United States Congress.

The United States Congress is the bicameral legislature of the federal government of the United States consisting of two houses: the lower house known as the House of Representatives and the upper house known as the Senate. The House and Senate are equal partners in the legislative process—legislation cannot be enacted without the consent of both chambers.

Once a bill is approved by one house, it is sent to the other which may pass, reject, or amend it. For the bill to become law, both houses must agree to identical versions of the bill. After passage by both houses, a bill is enrolled and sent to the president for signature or veto. Bills from the 117th Congress that have successfully completed this process become public laws, listed as Acts of the 117th United States Congress.

== Introduced in the House of Representatives ==
=== Passed by both houses, no presidential consent needed ===
| H.R. number | Date of introduction | Description |
|---|---|---|
| H.Con.Res. 10 | February 1, 2021 | Permitting the remains of the late United States Capitol Police Officer Brian D. Sicknick to lie in honor in the rotunda of the Capitol. |
| H.Con.Res. 27 | April 8, 2021 | Permitting the remains of the late United States Capitol Police Officer William F. Evans to lie in honor in the rotunda of the Capitol. |
| H.Con.Res. 28 | April 8, 2021 | Directing the Architect of the Capitol to transfer the catafalque situated in the Capitol Visitor Center to the rotunda of the Capitol for use in connection with services conducted for United States Capitol Police Officer William F. Evans. |
| H.Con.Res. 30 | April 20, 2021 | Providing for a joint session of Congress to receive a message from the President. |
| H.Con.Res. 41 | July 20, 2021 | Authorizing the use of the Capitol Grounds for the National Peace Officers Memorial Service and the National Honor Guard and Pipe Band Exhibition. |
| H.Con.Res. 64 | December 7, 2021 | Directing the Secretary of the Senate to make a correction in the enrollment of the bill S. 1605. |
| H.Con.Res. 69 | February 7, 2022 | Providing for a joint session of Congress to receive a message from the President. |

=== Passed by the House, waiting in the Senate ===
| H.R. number | Date of introduction | Short title | Description |
|---|---|---|---|
| H.R. 1 | January 4, 2021 | For the People Act of 2021 | To expand Americans' access to the ballot box, reduce the influence of big money in politics, and strengthen ethics rules for public servants, and for other purposes. |
| H.Con.Res. 1 | January 4, 2021 | (No short title) | Regarding consent to assemble outside the seat of government. |
| H.R. 4 | August 17, 2021 | John R. Lewis Voting Rights Advancement Act of 2021 | To amend the Voting Rights Act of 1965 to revise the criteria for determining which States and political subdivisions are subject to section 4 of the Act, and for other purposes. |
| H.R. 5 | February 18, 2021 | Equality Act of 2021 | To prohibit discrimination on the basis of sex, gender identity, and sexual orientation, and for other purposes. |
| H.R. 6 | March 3, 2021 | American Dream and Promise Act of 2021 | To authorize the cancellation of removal and adjustment of status of certain aliens, and for other purposes. |
| H.R. 7 | January 28, 2021 | Paycheck Fairness Act | To amend the Fair Labor Standards Act of 1938 to provide more effective remedies to victims of discrimination in the payment of wages on the basis of sex, and for other purposes. |
| H.R. 8 | March 1, 2021 | Bipartisan Background Checks Act of 2021 | To require a background check for every firearm sale. |
| H.Con.Res. 11 | February 1, 2021 | (No short title) | Establishing the congressional budget for the United States Government for fiscal year 2021 and setting forth the appropriate budgetary levels for fiscal years 2022 through 2030. |
| H.J.Res. 17 | January 21, 2021 | (No short title) | Removing the deadline for the ratification of the equal rights amendment. |
| H.R. 21 | January 4, 2021 | FedRAMP Authorization Act | To enhance the innovation, security, and availability of cloud computing products and services used in the Federal Government by establishing the Federal Risk and Authorization Management Program within the General Services Administration and by establishing a risk management, authorization, and continuous monitoring process to enable the Federal Government to leverage cloud computing products and services using a risk-based approach consistent with the Federal Information Security Modernization Act of 2014 and cloud-based operations, and for other purposes. |
| H.R. 23 | January 4, 2021 | Inspector General Protection Act | To require congressional notification for certain changes in status of inspectors general, and for other purposes. |
| H.R. 27 | January 4, 2021 | Settlement Agreement Information Database Act of 2021 | To amend chapter 3 of title 5, United States Code, to require the publication of settlement agreements, and for other purposes. |
| H.Con.Res. 44 | July 29, 2021 | Fiscal State of the Nation Resolution | Providing for a joint hearing of the Committees on the Budget of the House of Representatives and the Senate to receive a presentation from the Comptroller General of the United States regarding the audited financial statement of the executive branch. |
| H.R. 51 | January 4, 2021 | Washington, D.C. Admission Act | To provide for the admission of the State of Washington, D.C. into the Union. |
| H.R. 144 | January 4, 2021 | Supporting Early-Career Researchers Act | To forestall the loss of research talent by establishing a temporary early career research fellowship program. |
| H.R. 147 | January 4, 2021 | (No short title) | To amend title 10, United States Code, to make certain improvements to services and benefits for veterans and separating members of the Armed Forces with respect to apprenticeship programs, and for other purposes. |
| H.R. 172 | January 4, 2021 | United States Anti-Doping Agency Reauthorization Act of 2021 | To reauthorize the United States Anti-Doping Agency, and for other purposes. |
| H.R. 204 | January 5, 2021 | STEM Opportunities Act | To direct the Director of the Office of Science and Technology Policy to carry out programs and activities to ensure that Federal science agencies and institutions of higher education receiving Federal research and development funding are fully engaging their entire talent pool, and for other purposes. |
| H.R. 210 | January 5, 2021 | Rural STEM Education Research Act | To coordinate Federal research and development efforts focused on STEM education and workforce development in rural areas, including the development and application of new technologies to support and improve rural STEM education, and for other purposes. |
| H.R. 239 | January 11, 2021 | Equal Access to Contraception for Veterans Act | To amend title 38, United States Code, to provide for limitations on copayments for contraception furnished by the Department of Veterans Affairs, and for other purposes. |
| H.R. 240 | January 11, 2021 | Homeless Veterans with Children Reintegration Act | To amend title 38, United States Code, to direct the Secretary of Labor to prioritize the provision of services to homeless veterans with dependents in carrying out homeless veterans reintegration programs, and for other purposes. |
| H.R. 241 | January 11, 2021 | Tropical Forest and Coral Reef Conservation Reauthorization Act of 2021 | To reauthorize the Tropical Forest and Coral Reef Conservation Act of 1998. |
| H.R. 256 | January 11, 2021 | (No short title) | To repeal the Authorization for Use of Military Force Against Iraq Resolution of 2002. |
| H.R. 290 | January 13, 2021 | (No short title) | To amend title 38, United States Code, to render an individual, who transfers certain educational assistance, to which the individual is entitled because of an agreement by such individual to serve in the Armed Forces, to a dependent of that individual, and who fails to complete such agreement, solely liable for the overpayment of such educational assistance. |
| H.R. 297 | January 13, 2021 | (No short title) | To require the Secretary of Agriculture to conduct a study on the establishment of, and the potential land that could be included in, a unit of the National Forest System in the State of Hawaii, and for other purposes. |
| H.R. 391 | January 21, 2021 | Global Health Security Act of 2021 | To authorize a comprehensive, strategic approach for United States foreign assistance to developing countries to strengthen global health security, and for other purposes. |
| H.R. 433 | January 21, 2021 | Family Support Services for Addiction Act of 2021 | To establish a grant program for family community organizations that provide support for individuals struggling with substance use disorder and their families. |
| H.R. 446 | January 25, 2021 | Protecting Seniors from Emergency Scams Act | To require the Federal Trade Commission to submit a report to Congress on scams targeting seniors, and for other purposes. |
| H.R. 447 | January 25, 2021 | National Apprenticeship Act of 2021 | To amend the Act of August 16, 1937 (commonly referred to as the "National Apprenticeship Act") and expand the national apprenticeship system to include apprenticeships, youth apprenticeships, and pre-apprenticeship registered under such Act, to promote the furtherance of labor standards necessary to safeguard the welfare of apprentices, and for other purposes. |
| H.R. 468 | January 25, 2021 | Expedited Delivery of Airport Infrastructure Act of 2021 | To amend title 49, United States Code, to permit the use of incentive payments to expedite certain federally financed airport development projects. |
| H.R. 473 | January 25, 2021 | Trusted Traveler Reconsideration and Restoration Act of 2021 | To require a review of Department of Homeland Security trusted traveler programs, and for other purposes. |
| H.R. 478 | January 25, 2021 | Blackwater Trading Post Land Transfer Act | To direct the Secretary of the Interior to take certain land located in Pinal County, Arizona, into trust for the benefit of the Gila River Indian Community, and for other purposes. |
| H.R. 485 | January 25, 2021 | Stronger Child Abuse Prevention and Treatment Act | To reauthorize the Child Abuse Prevention and Treatment Act, and for other purposes. |
| H.R. 539 | January 28, 2021 | Preventing Disaster Revictimization Act | To amend the Disaster Recovery Reform Act of 2018 to require the Administrator of the Federal Emergency Management Agency to waive certain debts owed to the United States related to covered assistance provided to an individual or household, and for other purposes. |
| H.R. 546 | January 28, 2021 | Effective Assistance of Counsel in the Digital Era Act | To regulate monitoring of electronic communications between an incarcerated person in a Bureau of Prisons facility and that person's attorney or other legal representative, and for other purposes. |
| H.R. 550 | January 28, 2021 | Immunization Infrastructure Modernization Act of 2021 | To amend the Public Health Service Act with respect to immunization system data modernization and expansion, and for other purposes. |
| H.R. 567 | January 28, 2021 | Trans-Sahara Counterterrorism Partnership Program Act of 2021 | To establish an interagency program to assist countries in North and West Africa to improve immediate and long-term capabilities to counter terrorist threats, and for other purposes. |
| H.R. 586 | January 28, 2021 | STANDUP Act of 2021 | To amend the Public Health Service Act to provide best practices on student suicide awareness and prevention training and condition State educational agencies, local educational agencies, and tribal educational agencies receiving funds under section 520A of such Act to establish and implement a school-based student suicide awareness and prevention training policy. |
| H.R. 654 | February 1, 2021 | Drug-Free Communities Pandemic Relief Act | To provide the Administrator of the Drug-Free Communities Support Program the authority to waive the Federal fund limitation for the Drug-Free Communities Support Program. |
| H.R. 707 | February 2, 2021 | Ghost Army Congressional Gold Medal Act | To award a Congressional Gold Medal to the 23d Headquarters, Special Troops and the 3133d Signal Service Company, in recognition of their unique and highly distinguished service as a "Ghost Army" that conducted deception operations in Europe during World War II. |
| H.R. 721 | February 2, 2021 | Mental Health Services for Students Act of 2021 | To amend the Public Health Service Act to revise and extend projects relating to children and to provide access to school-based comprehensive mental health programs. |
| H.R. 735 | February 2, 2021 | (No short title) | To designate the facility of the United States Postal Service located at 502 East Cotati Avenue in Cotati, California, as the "Arturo L. Ibleto Post Office Building". |
| H.R. 767 | February 3, 2021 | (No short title) | To designate the facility of the United States Postal Service located at 40 Fulton Street in Middletown, New York, as the "Benjamin A. Gilman Post Office Building". |
| H.R. 768 | February 3, 2021 | Block, Report, And Suspend Suspicious Shipments Act of 2021 | To amend the Controlled Substances Act to clarify the process for registrants to exercise due diligence upon discovering a suspicious order, and for other purposes. |
| H.R. 803 | February 4, 2021 | Protecting America's Wilderness and Public Lands Act | To designate certain lands in the State of Colorado as components of the National Wilderness Preservation System, and for other purposes. |
| H.R. 810 | February 4, 2021 | (No short title) | To amend the National Trails System Act to direct the Secretary of the Interior to conduct a study on the feasibility of designating the Chief Standing Bear National Historic Trail, and for other purposes. |
| H.R. 813 | February 4, 2021 | (No short title) | To designate the facility of the United States Postal Service located at 1050 Sunset Road Southwest in Albuquerque, New Mexico, as the "Jose Hernandez Post Office Building". |
| H.R. 826 | February 4, 2021 | Divided Families Reunification Act | To require consultations on reuniting Korean Americans with family members in North Korea. |
| H.R. 842 | February 4, 2021 | Protecting the Right to Organize Act of 2021 | To amend the National Labor Relations Act, the Labor Management Relations Act, 1947, and the Labor-Management Reporting and Disclosure Act of 1959, and for other purposes. |
| H.R. 897 | February 5, 2021 | Agua Caliente Land Exchange Fee to Trust Confirmation Act | To take certain lands in California into trust for the benefit of the Agua Caliente Band of Cahuilla Indians, and for other purposes. |
| H.R. 951 | February 8, 2021 | Maternal Vaccination Act | To direct the Secretary of Health and Human Services to carry out a national campaign to increase awareness of the importance of maternal vaccinations for the health of pregnant and postpartum individuals and their children, and for other purposes. |
| H.R. 958 | February 8, 2021 | Protecting Moms Who Served Act | To codify maternity care coordination programs at the Department of Veterans Affairs, and for other purposes. |
| H.R. 983 | February 8, 2021 | Preventing Crimes Against Veterans Act of 2021 | To amend title 18, United States Code, to provide an additional tool to prevent certain frauds against veterans, and for other purposes. |
| H.R. 1029 | February 11, 2021 | Free Veterans from Fees Act | To Waive the application fee for any special use permit for veterans' special events at war memorials on land administered by the National Park Service in the District of Columbia and its environs, and for other purposes. |
| H.R. 1065 | February 15, 2021 | Pregnant Workers Fairness Act | To eliminate discrimination and promote women's health and economic security by ensuring reasonable workplace accommodations for workers whose ability to perform the functions of a job are limited by pregnancy, childbirth, or a related medical condition. |
| H.R. 1083 | February 15, 2021 | Southeast Asia Strategy Act | To require a strategy for engagement with Southeast Asia and the Association of Southeast Asian Nations (ASEAN). |
| H.R. 1085 | February 18, 2021 | (No short title) | To award three congressional gold medals to the United States Capitol Police and those who protected the U.S. Capitol on January 6, 2021. |
| H.R. 1112 | February 18, 2021 | Protect Democracy in Burma Act of 2021 | To require a report on the military coup in Burma, and for other purposes. |
| H.R. 1139 | February 18, 2021 | Cardiovascular Advances in Research and Opportunities Legacy Act | To amend title IV of the Public Health Service Act to direct the Director of the National Institutes of Health, in consultation with the Director of the National Heart, Lung, and Blood Institute, shall establish a program under which the Director of the National Institutes of Health shall support or conduct research on valvular heart disease, and for other purposes. |
| H.R. 1154 | February 18, 2021 | Great Dismal Swamp National Heritage Area Act | To authorize the Secretary of the Interior to conduct a study to assess the suitability and feasibility of designating certain land as the Great Dismal Swamp National Heritage Area, and for other purposes. |
| H.R. 1157 | February 18, 2021 | Department of State Authorization Act of 2021 | To provide for certain authorities of the Department of State, and for other purposes. |
| H.R. 1170 | February 18, 2021 | (No short title) | To designate the facility of the United States Postal Service located at 1 League in Irvine, California, as the "Tuskegee Airman Lieutenant Colonel Robert J. Friend Memorial Post Office Building". |
| H.R. 1187 | February 18, 2021 | Corporate Governance Improvement and Investor Protection Act | To provide for disclosure of additional material information about public companies and establish a Sustainable Finance Advisory Committee, and for other purposes. |
| H.R. 1193 | February 22, 2021 | Cardiovascular Advances in Research and Opportunities Legacy Act | To amend title IV of the Public Health Service Act to direct the Director of the National Institutes of Health, in consultation with the Director of the National Heart, Lung, and Blood Institute, shall establish a program under which the Director of the National Institutes of Health shall support or conduct research on valvular heart disease, and for other purposes. |
| H.R. 1195 | February 22, 2021 | Workplace Violence Prevention for Health Care and Social Service Workers Act | To direct the Secretary of Labor to issue an occupational safety and health standard that requires covered employers within the health care and social service industries to develop and implement a comprehensive workplace violence prevention plan, and for other purposes. |
| H.R. 1205 | February 22, 2021 | Improving Mental Health Access from the Emergency Department Act of 2021 | To authorize the Secretary of Health and Human Services, acting through the Director of the Center for Mental Health Services of the Substance Abuse and Mental Health Services Administration, to award grants to implement innovative approaches to securing prompt access to appropriate follow-on care for individuals who experience an acute mental health episode and present for care in an emergency department, and for other purposes. |
| H.R. 1215 | February 23, 2021 | Fraud and Scam Reduction Act | To establish an office within the Federal Trade Commission and an outside advisory group to prevent fraud targeting seniors and to direct the Commission to include additional information in an annual report to Congress on fraud targeting seniors, and for other purposes. |
| H.R. 1228 | February 23, 2021 | Libya Stabilization Act | To advance a diplomatic solution to the conflict in Libya and support the people of Libya. |
| H.R. 1257 | February 23, 2021 | Homeless Veterans CREDIT Act | To direct the Secretary of Veterans Affairs to conduct a study on the effect of financial and credit counseling for homeless veterans and veterans experiencing housing instability, and for other purposes. |
| H.R. 1260 | February 23, 2021 | Bipartisan Solution to Cyclical Violence Act of 2021 | To amend the Public Health Service Act to establish a grant program supporting trauma center violence intervention and violence prevention programs, and for other purposes. |
| H.R. 1262 | February 23, 2021 | Notice to Airmen Improvement Act of 2021 | To establish a task force on improvements for certain notices to airmen, and for other purposes. |
| H.R. 1280 | February 24, 2021 | George Floyd Justice in Policing Act of 2021 | To hold law enforcement accountable for misconduct in court, improve transparency through data collection, and reform police training and policies. |
| H.R. 1298 | February 24, 2021 | (No short title) | To designate the facility of the United States Postal Service located at 1233 North Cedar Street in Owasso, Oklahoma, as the "Technical Sergeant Marshal Roberts Post Office Building". |
| H.R. 1324 | February 25, 2021 | Effective Suicide Screening and Assessment in the Emergency Department Act of 2021 | To amend the Public Health Service Act to establish a program to improve the identification, assessment, and treatment of patients in hospital emergency departments who are at risk of suicide, and for other purposes. |
| H.R. 1333 | February 25, 2021 | NO BAN Act | To transfer and limit Executive Branch authority to suspend or restrict the entry of a class of aliens. |
| H.R. 1339 | February 25, 2021 | Advanced Air Mobility Coordination and Leadership Act | To require the Secretary of Transportation to establish an advanced air mobility interagency working group, and for other purposes. |
| H.R. 1374 | February 25, 2021 | Enhancing State Energy Security Planning and Emergency Preparedness Act of 2021 | To amend the Energy Policy and Conservation Act to provide Federal financial assistance to States to implement, review, and revise State energy security plans, and for other purposes. |
| H.R. 1392 | February 26, 2021 | Protection of Saudi Dissidents Act of 2021 | To protect Saudi dissidents in the United States, and for other purposes. |
| H.R. 1443 | February 26, 2021 | LGBTQ Business Equal Credit Enforcement and Investment Act | To amend the Equal Credit Opportunity Act to require the collection of small business loan data related to LGBTQ-owned businesses. |
| H.R. 1444 | February 26, 2021 | (No short title) | To designate the facility of the United States Postal Service located at 132 North Loudoun Street, Suite 1 in Winchester, Virginia, as the "Patsy Cline Post Office". |
| H.R. 1446 | March 1, 2021 | Enhanced Background Checks Act of 2021 | To amend chapter 44 of title 18, United States Code, to strengthen the background check procedures to be followed before a Federal firearms licensee may transfer a firearm to a person who is not such a licensee. |
| H.R. 1447 | March 1, 2021 | COAST Research Act of 2021 | To amend the Federal Ocean Acidification Research and Monitoring Act of 2009 to establish an Ocean Acidification Advisory Board, to expand and improve the research on Ocean Acidification and Coastal Acidification, to establish and maintain a data archive system for Ocean Acidification data and Coastal Acidification data, and for other purposes. |
| H.R. 1448 | March 1, 2021 | PAWS for Veterans Therapy Act | To direct the Secretary of Veterans Affairs to carry out a pilot program on dog training therapy, and to amend title 38, United States Code, to authorize the Secretary of Veterans Affairs to provide service dogs to veterans with mental illnesses who do not have mobility impairments. |
| H.R. 1460 | March 1, 2021 | Nicholas and Zachary Burt Memorial Carbon Monoxide Poisoning Prevention Act of 2021 | To encourage States to require the installation of residential carbon monoxide detectors in homes, and for other purposes. |
| H.R. 1475 | March 1, 2021 | Pursuing Equity in Mental Health Act | To address mental health issues for youth, particularly youth of color, and for other purposes. |
| H.R. 1480 | March 2, 2021 | HERO Act | To require the Secretary of Health and Human Services to improve the detection, prevention, and treatment of mental health issues among public safety officers, and for other purposes. |
| H.R. 1482 | March 2, 2021 | 504 Credit Risk Management Improvement Act of 2021 | To amend the Small Business Act to enhance the Office of Credit Risk Management, to require the Administrator of the Small Business Administration to issue rules relating to environmental obligations of certified development companies, and for other purposes. |
| H.R. 1487 | March 2, 2021 | Microloan Transparency and Accountability Act of 2021 | To amend the Small Business Act to increase transparency, and for other purposes. |
| H.R. 1490 | March 2, 2021 | 504 Modernization and Small Manufacturer Enhancement Act of 2021 | To amend the Small Business Investment Act of 1958 to improve the loan guaranty program, enhance the ability of small manufacturers to access affordable capital, and for other purposes. |
| H.R. 1502 | March 2, 2021 | Microloan Improvement Act of 2021 | To amend the Small Business Act to optimize the operations of the microloan program, lower costs for small business concerns and intermediary participants in the program, and for other purposes. |
| H.R. 1508 | March 2, 2021 | Guidance Clarity Act of 2021 | To require a guidance clarity statement on certain agency guidance, and for other purposes. |
| H.R. 1510 | March 2, 2021 | (No short title) | To direct the Secretary of Veterans Affairs to submit to Congress a report on the use of cameras in medical facilities of the Department of Veterans Affairs. |
| H.R. 1550 | March 3, 2021 | PREVENT HPV Cancers Act of 2021 | To amend the Public Health Service Act to provide for a public awareness campaign with respect to human papillomavirus, and for other purposes. |
| H.R. 1573 | March 3, 2021 | Access to Counsel Act of 2021 | To clarify the rights of all persons who are held or detained at a port of entry or at any detention facility overseen by U.S. Customs and Border Protection or U.S. Immigration and Customs Enforcement. |
| H.R. 1603 | March 8, 2021 | Farm Workforce Modernization Act of 2021 | To amend the Immigration and Nationality Act to provide for terms and conditions for nonimmigrant workers performing agricultural labor or services, and for other purposes. |
| H.R. 1619 | March 8, 2021 | Catawba Indian Nation Lands Act | To clarify the status of gaming conducted by the Catawba Indian Nation, and for other purposes. |
| H.R. 1620 | March 8, 2021 | Violence Against Women Reauthorization Act of 2021 | To reauthorize the Violence Against Women Act of 1994, and for other purposes. |
| H.R. 1629 | March 8, 2021 | Fairness in Orphan Drug Exclusivity Act | To amend the Federal Food, Drug, and Cosmetic Act with respect to limitations on exclusive approval or licensure of orphan drugs, and for other purposes. |
| H.R. 1667 | March 8, 2021 | Dr. Lorna Breen Health Care Provider Protection Act | To address behavioral health and well-being among health care professionals. |
| H.R. 1688 | March 9, 2021 | Native American Child Protection Act | To amend the Indian Child Protection and Family Violence Prevention Act. |
| H.R. 1693 | March 9, 2021 | EQUAL Act of 2021 | To eliminate the disparity in sentencing for cocaine offenses, and for other purposes. |
| H.R. 1711 | March 9, 2021 | Financial Inclusion in Banking Act of 2021 | To amend the Consumer Financial Protection Act of 2010 to direct the Office of Community Affairs to identify causes leading to, and solutions for, under-banked, un-banked, and underserved consumers, and for other purposes. |
| H.R. 1762 | March 10, 2021 | Protecting Indian Tribes from Scams Act | To direct the Federal Trade Commission to submit to Congress a report on unfair or deceptive acts or practices targeted at Indian Tribes or members of Indian Tribes, and for other purposes. |
| H.R. 1836 | March 11, 2021 | Guard and Reserve GI Bill Parity Act of 2021 | To amend title 38, United States Code, to ensure that the time during which members of the Armed Forces serve on active duty for training qualifies for educational assistance under the Post-9/11 Educational Assistance Program of the Department of Veterans Affairs, and for other purposes. |
| H.R. 1870 | March 12, 2021 | Strengthening Local Transportation Security Capabilities Act of 2021 | To require the Secretary of Homeland Security to prioritize strengthening of local transportation security capabilities by assigning certain officers and intelligence analysts to State, local, and regional fusion centers in jurisdictions with a high-risk surface transportation asset and improving the timely sharing of information regarding threats of terrorism and other threats, including targeted violence, and for other purposes. |
| H.R. 1917 | March 16, 2021 | Hazard Eligibility and Local Projects Act | To modify eligibility requirements for certain hazard mitigation assistance programs, and for other purposes. |
| H.R. 1975 | March 17, 2021 | Pala Band of Mission Indians Land Transfer Act of 2021 | To take certain land located in San Diego County, California, into trust for the benefit of the Pala Band of Mission Indians, and for other purposes. |
| H.R. 1996 | March 18, 2021 | SAFE Banking Act of 2021 | To create protections for financial institutions that provide financial services to cannabis-related legitimate businesses and service providers for such businesses, and for other purposes. |
| H.R. 2016 | March 18, 2021 | Federal Disaster Assistance Coordination Act | To amend the Disaster Recovery Reform Act of 2018 to develop a study regarding streamlining and consolidating information collection and preliminary damage assessments, and for other purposes. |
| H.R. 2027 | March 18, 2021 | MSI STEM Achievement Act | To direct Federal science agencies and the Office of Science and Technology Policy to undertake activities to improve the quality of undergraduate STEM education and enhance the research capacity at the Nation's HBCUs, TCUs, and MSIs, and for other purposes. |
| H.R. 2062 | March 18, 2021 | Protecting Older Workers Against Discrimination Act of 2021 | To amend the Age Discrimination in Employment Act of 1967 and other laws to clarify appropriate standards for Federal employment discrimination and retaliation claims, and for other purposes. |
| H.R. 2074 | March 18, 2021 | Indian Buffalo Management Act | To assist Tribal governments in the management of buffalo and buffalo habitat and the reestablishment of buffalo on Indian land. |
| H.R. 2088 | March 19, 2021 | Eastern Band of Cherokee Historic Lands Reacquisition Act | To take certain Federal lands in Tennessee into trust for the benefit of the Eastern Band of Cherokee Indians, and for other purposes. |
| H.R. 2119 | March 23, 2021 | Family Violence Prevention and Services Improvement Act of 2021 | To amend the Family Violence Prevention and Services Act to make improvements. |
| H.R. 2167 | March 23, 2021 | GI Bill National Emergency Extended Deadline Act | To amend title 38, United States Code, to provide for extensions of the time limitations for use of entitlement under Department of Veterans Affairs educational assistance programs by reason of school closures due to emergency and other situations, and for other purposes. |
| H.R. 2208 | March 26, 2021 | Ysleta del Sur Pueblo and Alabama-Coushatta Tribes of Texas Equal and Fair Opportunity Act | To restore an opportunity for tribal economic development on terms that are equal and fair, and for other purposes. |
| H.R. 2220 | March 26, 2021 | (No short title) | To amend title 40, United States Code, to modify the treatment of certain bargain-price options to purchase at less than fair market value, and for other purposes. |
| H.R. 2225 | March 26, 2021 | National Science Foundation for the Future Act | To authorize appropriations for fiscal years 2022, 2023, 2024, 2025, and 2026 for the National Science Foundation, and for other purposes. |
| H.R. 2265 | March 26, 2021 | Financial Exploitation Prevention Act of 2021 | To amend the Investment Company Act of 1940 to postpone the date of payment or satisfaction upon redemption of certain securities in the case of the financial exploitation of specified adults, and for other purposes. |
| H.R. 2355 | April 5, 2021 | Opioid Prescription Verification Act of 2021 | To facilitate responsible, informed dispensing of controlled substances and other prescribed medications, and for other purposes. |
| H.R. 2364 | April 5, 2021 | Synthetic Opioid Danger Awareness Act | To amend title III of the Public Health Service Act to direct the Secretary, acting through the Director of the Centers for Disease Control and Prevention, to provide for a public education campaign to raise public awareness of synthetic opioids. |
| H.R. 2365 | April 5, 2021 | Gold Star Mothers Family Monument Extension Act | To extend the authority for the establishment of a commemorative work in honor of Gold Star Families, and for other purposes. |
| H.R. 2379 | April 8, 2021 | State Opioid Response Grant Authorization Act of 2021 | To amend the 21st Century Cures Act to reauthorize and expand a grant program for State response to the opioid use disorders crisis, and for other purposes. |
| H.R. 2429 | April 8, 2021 | VA Police Improvement and Accountability Act | To amend title 38, United States Code, to improve the staffing, transparency, and accountability of the law enforcement operations of the Department of Veterans Affairs, and for other purposes. |
| H.R. 2433 | April 8, 2021 | Burn Pit Registry Enhancement Act | To direct the Secretary of Veterans Affairs to take actions necessary to ensure that certain individuals may update the burn pit registry with a registered individual's cause of death, and for other purposes. |
| H.R. 2467 | April 13, 2021 | PFAS Action Act of 2021 | To require the Administrator of the Environmental Protection Agency to designate per- and polyfluoroalkyl substances as hazardous substances under the Comprehensive Environmental Response, Compensation, and Liability Act of 1980. |
| H.R. 2485 | April 13, 2021 | Access to Congressionally Mandated Reports Act | To require the Director of the Government Publishing Office to establish and maintain an online portal accessible to the public that allows the public to obtain electronic copies of all congressionally mandated reports in one place, and for other purposes. |
| H.R. 2494 | April 13, 2021 | (No short title) | To amend title 38, United States Code, to establish in the Department the Veterans Economic Opportunity and Transition Administration, and for other purposes. |
| H.R. 2533 | April 14, 2021 | NEAR Act of 2021 | To provide for a study by the National Academies of Sciences, Engineering, and Medicine examining the impact of ocean acidification and other stressors in estuarine environments. |
| H.R. 2547 | April 15, 2021 | Comprehensive Debt Collection Improvement Act | To expand and enhance consumer, student, servicemember, and small business protections with respect to debt collection practices, and for other purposes. |
| H.R. 2617 | April 16, 2021 | Performance Enhancement Reform Act | To amend section 1115 of title 31, United States Code, to amend the description of how performance goals are achieved, and for other purposes. |
| H.R. 2655 | April 19, 2021 | Insider Trading Prohibition Act | To amend the Securities Exchange Act of 1934 to prohibit certain securities trading and related communications by those who possess material, nonpublic information. |
| H.R. 2662 | April 19, 2021 | IG Independence and Empowerment Act | To amend the Inspector General Act of 1978, and for other purposes. |
| H.R. 2668 | April 20, 2021 | Consumer Protection and Recovery Act | To amend the Federal Trade Commission Act to affirmatively confirm the authority of the Federal Trade Commission to seek permanent injunctions and other equitable relief for violations of any provision of law enforced by the Commission. |
| H.R. 2685 | April 20, 2021 | Understanding Cybersecurity of Mobile Networks Act | To direct the Assistant Secretary of Commerce for Communications and Information to submit to Congress a report examining the cybersecurity of mobile service networks, and for other purposes. |
| H.R. 2695 | April 20, 2021 | Combating Sexual Harassment in Science Act | To provide for research to better understand the causes and consequences of sexual harassment affecting individuals in the scientific, technical, engineering, and mathematics workforce and to examine policies to reduce the prevalence and negative impact of such harassment, and for other purposes. |
| H.R. 2704 | April 20, 2021 | Improving VA Accountability To Prevent Sexual Harassment and Discrimination Act of 2021 | To amend title 38, United States Code, to improve the equal employment opportunity functions of Department of Veterans Affairs, and for other purposes. |
| H.R. 2726 | April 21, 2021 | VA FOIA Reform Act of 2021 | To direct the Secretary of Veterans Affairs to establish a plan to reduce the backlog of requests for information made to the Department of Veterans Affairs pursuant to section 552 of title 5, United States Code, and for other purposes. |
| H.R. 2758 | April 22, 2021 | Lumbee Recognition Act | To provide for the recognition of the Lumbee Tribe of North Carolina, and for other purposes. |
| H.R. 2788 | April 22, 2021 | VA Equal Employment Opportunity Counselor Modernization Act | To amend title 38, United States Code, to eliminate the cap on full-time employees of the Department of Veterans Affairs who provide equal employment opportunity counseling. |
| H.R. 2862 | April 28, 2021 | Campaign to Prevent Suicide Act | To require the Secretary of Health and Human Services to conduct a national suicide prevention media campaign, and for other purposes. |
| H.R. 2877 | April 28, 2021 | Behavioral Intervention Guidelines Act of 2021 | To amend the Public Health Service Act to direct the Secretary of Health and Human Services to develop best practices for the establishment and use of behavioral intervention teams at schools, and for other purposes. |
| H.R. 2878 | April 28, 2021 | Native VetSuccess at Tribal Colleges and Universities Pilot Program Act | To direct the Secretary of Veterans Affairs to carry out a Native VetSuccess at Tribal Colleges and Universities Pilot Program. |
| H.R. 2915 | April 30, 2021 | HOPR Act | To amend the Homeland Security Act of 2002 regarding the procurement of certain items related to national security interests for Department of Homeland Security frontline operational components, and for other purposes. |
| H.R. 2930 | April 30, 2021 | Safeguard Tribal Objects of Patrimony Act of 2021 | To enhance protections of Native American tangible cultural heritage, and for other purposes. |
| H.R. 2931 | April 30, 2021 | Enhancing Grid Security through Public-Private Partnerships Act | To provide for certain programs and developments in the Department of Energy concerning the cybersecurity and vulnerabilities of, and physical threats to, the electric grid, and for other purposes. |
| H.R. 2955 | May 4, 2021 | Suicide Prevention Act | To authorize a pilot program to expand and intensify surveillance of self-harm in partnership with State and local public health departments, to establish a grant program to provide self-harm and suicide prevention services in hospital emergency departments, and for other purposes. |
| H.R. 2959 | May 4, 2021 | COVID-19 Fraud Prevention Act | To establish the Consumer and Investor Fraud Working Group to help protect consumers and investors from fraud during the COVID-19 pandemic, to assist consumers and investors affected by such fraud, and for other purposes. |
| H.R. 2981 | May 4, 2021 | Suicide Prevention Lifeline Improvement Act of 2021 | To amend the Public Health Service Act to ensure the provision of high-quality service through the Suicide Prevention Lifeline, and for other purposes. |
| H.R. 2989 | May 4, 2021 | Financial Transparency Act of 2021 | To amend securities, commodities, and banking laws to make the information reported to financial regulatory agencies electronically searchable, to further enable the development of RegTech and Artificial Intelligence applications, to put the United States on a path towards building a comprehensive Standard Business Reporting program to ultimately harmonize and reduce the private sector's regulatory compliance burden, while enhancing transparency and accountability, and for other purposes. |
| H.R. 3005 | May 7, 2021 | (No short title) | To direct the Joint Committee on the Library to replace the bust of Roger Brooke Taney in the Old Supreme Court Chamber of the United States Capitol with a bust of Thurgood Marshall to be obtained by the Joint Committee on the Library and to remove certain statues from areas of the United States Capitol which are accessible to the public, to remove all statues of individuals who voluntarily served the Confederate States of America from display in the United States Capitol, and for other purposes. |
| H.R. 3008 | May 7, 2021 | (No short title) | To amend the National Housing Act to authorize State-licensed appraisers to conduct appraisals in connection with mortgages insured by the FHA and to require compliance with the existing appraiser education requirement, and for other purposes. |
| H.R. 3110 | May 11, 2021 | PUMP for Nursing Mothers Act | To amend the Fair Labor Standards Act of 1938 to expand access to breastfeeding accommodations in the workplace, and for other purposes. |
| H.R. 3119 | May 11, 2021 | Energy Emergency Leadership Act | To amend the Department of Energy Organization Act with respect to functions assigned to Assistant Secretaries, and for other purposes. |
| H.R. 3125 | May 11, 2021 | COVID-19 Emergency Medical Supplies Enhancement Act of 2021 | To enhance authorities under the Defense Production Act of 1950 to respond to the COVID-19 emergency, to provide additional oversight of such authorities, and for other purposes. |
| H.R. 3146 | May 12, 2021 | SAVE Act of 2021 | To amend the Defense Production Act of 1950 to ensure the supply of certain medical materials essential to national defense, and for other purposes. |
| H.R. 3175 | May 13, 2021 | (No short title) | To designate the facility of the United States Postal Service located at 135 Main Street in Biloxi, Mississippi, as the "Robert S. McKeithen Post Office Building". |
| H.R. 3193 | May 13, 2021 | E-BRIDGE Act | To amend the Public Works and Economic Development Act of 1965 to provide for a high-speed broadband deployment initiative. |
| H.R. 3233 | May 14, 2021 | National Commission to Investigate the January 6 Attack on the United States Capitol Complex Act | To establish the National Commission to Investigate the January 6 Attack on the United States Capitol Complex, and for other purposes. |
| H.R. 3462 | May 21, 2021 | SBA Cyber Awareness Act | To require an annual report on the cybersecurity of the Small Business Administration, and for other purposes. |
| H.R. 3469 | May 21, 2021 | Veteran Entrepreneurship Training Act of 2021 | To amend the Small Business Act to codify the Boots to Business Program, and for other purposes. |
| H.R. 3485 | May 25, 2021 | Global Respect Act | To impose sanctions on foreign persons responsible for violations of internationally recognized human rights against lesbian, gay, bisexual, transgender, queer and intersex (LGBTQI) individuals, and for other purposes. |
| H.R. 3531 | May 25, 2021 | Women Who Worked on the Home Front World War II Memorial Act | To authorize the Women Who Worked on the Home Front Foundation to establish a commemorative work in the District of Columbia and its environs, and for other purposes. |
| H.R. 3533 | May 25, 2021 | (No short title) | To establish occupational series for Federal positions in software development, software engineering, data science, and data management, and for other purposes. |
| H.R. 3579 | May 28, 2021 | (No short title) | To designate the facility of the United States Postal Service located at 200 East Main Street in Maroa, Illinois, as the "Jeremy L. Ridlen Post Office". |
| H.R. 3593 | May 28, 2021 | Department of Energy Science for the Future Act | To provide guidance for and investment in the research and development activities of the Department of Energy Office of Science, and for other purposes. |
| H.R. 3599 | May 28, 2021 | Federal Rotational Cyber Workforce Program Act of 2021 | To establish a Federal rotational cyber workforce program for the Federal cyber workforce, and for other purposes. |
| H.R. 3613 | May 28, 2021 | (No short title) | To designate the facility of the United States Postal Service located at 202 Trumbull Street in Saint Clair, Michigan, as the "Corporal Jeffrey Robert Standfest Post Office Building". |
| H.R. 3616 | May 28, 2021 | Bear River National Heritage Area Study Act | To authorize the Secretary of the Interior to conduct a study to assess the suitability and feasibility of designating certain land as the Bear River National Heritage Area, and for other purposes. |
| H.R. 3635 | May 28, 2021 | Strengthening America's Strategic National Stockpile Act of 2021 | To amend the Public Health Service Act with respect to the Strategic National Stockpile, and for other purposes. |
| H.R. 3709 | June 4, 2021 | Preliminary Damage Assessment Improvement Act of 2021 | To direct the Administrator of the Federal Emergency Management Agency to submit to Congress a report on preliminary damage assessments and make necessary improvements to processes in the Federal Emergency Management Agency, and for other purposes. |
| H.R. 3730 | June 4, 2021 | (No short title) | To amend title 38, United States Code, to establish in the Department of Veterans Affairs an Advisory Committee on United States Outlying Areas and Freely Associated States, and for other purposes. |
| H.R. 3743 | June 8, 2021 | Supporting the Foundation for the National Institutes of Health and the Reagan-Udall Foundation for the Food and Drug Administration Act | To increase funding for the Reagan-Udall Foundation for the Food and Drug Administration and for the Foundation for the National Institutes of Health. |
| H.R. 3755 | June 8, 2021 | Women's Health Protection Act of 2021 | To protect a person's ability to determine whether to continue or end a pregnancy, and to protect a health care provider's ability to provide abortion services. |
| H.R. 3894 | June 15, 2021 | CARING for Social Determinants Act of 2021 | To require the Secretary of Health and Human Services to issue and disseminate guidance to States to clarify strategies to address social determinants of health under the Medicaid program and the Children's Health Insurance Program, and for other purposes. |
| H.R. 3967 | June 17, 2021 | Honoring our PACT Act of 2021 | To improve health care and benefits for veterans exposed to toxic substances, and for other purposes. |
| H.R. 3985 | June 17, 2021 | Averting Loss of Life and Injury by Expediting SIVs Act of 2021 | To amend the Afghan Allies Protection Act of 2009 to expedite the special immigrant visa process for certain Afghan allies, and for other purposes. |
| H.R. 3992 | June 17, 2021 | POJA Act of 2021 | To amend the Age Discrimination in Employment Act of 1967 to prohibit employers from limiting, segregating, or classifying applicants for employment. |
| H.R. 4026 | June 22, 2021 | Social Determinants of Health Data Analysis Act of 2021 | To require the Comptroller General of the United States to submit to Congress a report on actions taken by the Secretary of Health and Human Services to address social determinants of health. |
| H.R. 4028 | June 22, 2021 | Information and Communication Technology Strategy Act | To require the Secretary of Commerce to report on and develop a whole-of-Government strategy with respect to the economic competitiveness of the information and communication technology supply chain, and for other purposes. |
| H.R. 4032 | June 22, 2021 | Open RAN Outreach Act | To provide outreach and technical assistance to small providers regarding the benefits of Open RAN networks, and for other purposes. |
| H.R. 4035 | June 22, 2021 | Real Justice for Our Veterans Act of 2021 | To amend the Omnibus Crime Control and Safe Streets Act of 1968 to prioritize veterans court treatment programs that ensure equal access for racial and ethnic minorities and women, and for other purposes. |
| H.R. 4045 | June 22, 2021 | FUTURE Networks Act | To direct the Federal Communications Commission to establish a task force to be known as the "6G Task Force", and for other purposes. |
| H.R. 4055 | June 22, 2021 | American Cybersecurity Literacy Act | To establish a cybersecurity literacy campaign, and for other purposes. |
| H.R. 4067 | June 22, 2021 | Communications Security, Reliability, and Interoperability Council Act | To direct the Federal Communications Commission to establish a council to make recommendations on ways to increase the security, reliability, and interoperability of communications networks, and for other purposes. |
| H.R. 4089 | June 23, 2021 | Cambodia Democracy Act of 2021 | To promote free and fair elections, political freedoms, and human rights in Cambodia, and for other purposes. |
| H.R. 4094 | June 23, 2021 | One-Stop Pilot Program Act of 2021 | To conduct a pilot program at foreign last point of departure airports to permit passengers and their accessible property to continue on additional flights or flight segments originating in the United States without additional security re-screening, and for other purposes. |
| H.R. 4111 | June 23, 2021 | Sovereign Debt Contract Capacity Act | To require the Secretary of the Treasury to direct the United States Executive Director at the International Monetary Fund to advocate that the Fund provide technical assistance to Fund members seeking to enhance their capacity to evaluate the legal and financial terms of sovereign debt contracts, and for other purposes. |
| H.R. 4168 | June 25, 2021 | (No short title) | To designate the facility of the United States Postal Service located at 6223 Maple Street, in Omaha, Nebraska, as the "Petty Officer 1st Class Charles Jackson French Post Office". |
| H.R. 4233 | June 29, 2021 | Student Veterans Counseling Centers Eligibility Act | To amend title 38, United States Code, to furnish Vet Center readjustment counseling and related mental health services to veterans and members of the Armed Forces using certain educational assistance benefits. |
| H.R. 4250 | June 30, 2021 | War Crimes Rewards Expansion Act | To amend the State Department Basic Authorities Act of 1956 to provide for rewards for the arrest or conviction of certain foreign nationals who have committed genocide or war crimes, and for other purposes. |
| H.R. 4256 | June 30, 2021 | Investing in Main Street Act of 2021 | To amend the Small Business Investment Act of 1958 to increase the amount that certain banks and savings associations may invest in small business investment companies, subject to the approval of the appropriate Federal banking agency, and for other purposes. |
| H.R. 4300 | July 1, 2021 | Alexander Lofgren Veterans in Parks (VIP) Act | To direct the Secretary of the Interior and the Secretary of Agriculture to make free National Parks and Federal Recreational Lands Passes available to members of the Armed Forces, and for other purposes. |
| H.R. 4346 | July 1, 2021 | Legislative Branch Appropriations Act, 2022 | Making appropriations for Legislative Branch for the fiscal year ending September 30, 2022, and for other purposes. |
| H.R. 4350 | July 2, 2021 | National Defense Authorization Act for Fiscal Year 2022 | To authorize appropriations for fiscal year 2022 for military activities of the Department of Defense, for military construction, and for defense activities of the Department of Energy, to prescribe military personnel strengths for such fiscal year, and for other purposes. |
| H.R. 4352 | July 2, 2021 | (No short title) | To amend the Act of June 18, 1934, to reaffirm the authority of the Secretary of the Interior to take land into trust for Indian Tribes, and for other purposes. |
| H.R. 4363 | July 6, 2021 | DHS Contract Reporting Act of 2021 | To establish a daily public reporting requirement for covered contract awards of the Department of Homeland Security, and for other purposes. |
| H.R. 4369 | July 6, 2021 | National Centers of Excellence in Advanced and Continuous Pharmaceutical Manufacturing Act of 2021 | To amend the 21st Century Cures Act to provide for designation of institutions of higher education that provide research, data, and leadership on continuous manufacturing as National Centers of Excellence in Continuous Pharmaceutical Manufacturing, and for other purposes. |
| H.R. 4373 | July 6, 2021 | Department of State, Foreign Operations, and Related Programs Appropriations Act, 2022 | Making appropriations for the Department of State, foreign operations, and related programs for the fiscal year ending September 30, 2022, and for other purposes. |
| H.R. 4426 | July 13, 2021 | Homeland Security for Children Act | To amend the Homeland Security Act of 2002 to ensure that the needs of children are considered in homeland security planning, and for other purposes. |
| H.R. 4481 | July 16, 2021 | Small Business 7(a) Loan Agent Transparency Act | To amend the Small Business Act to establish requirements for 7(a) agents, and for other purposes. |
| H.R. 4489 | July 16, 2021 | National Forest Restoration and Remediation Act | To amend the Act of June 20, 1958, to require that certain amounts collected by the United States with respect to lands under the administration of the Forest Service be invested into interest bearing obligations, and for other purposes. |
| H.R. 4502 | July 19, 2021 | Labor, Health and Human Services, Education, Agriculture, Rural Development, Energy and Water Development, Financial Services and General Government, Interior, Environment, Military Construction, Veterans Affairs, Transportation, and Housing and Urban Development Appropriations Act, 2022 | Making appropriations for the Departments of Labor, Health and Human Services, and Education, and related agencies for the fiscal year ending September 30, 2022, and for other purposes. |
| H.R. 4515 | July 19, 2021 | Small Business Development Center Cyber Training Act of 2021 | To amend the Small Business Act to require cyber certification for small business development center counselors, and for other purposes. |
| H.R. 4521 | July 19, 2021 | Bioeconomy Research and Development Act of 2021 | To provide for a coordinated Federal research initiative to ensure continued United States leadership in engineering biology. |
| H.R. 4531 | July 19, 2021 | 7(a) Loan Agent Oversight Act | To amend the Small Business Act to require a report on 7(a) agents, and for other purposes. |
| H.R. 4555 | July 20, 2021 | Oral Health Literacy and Awareness Act of 2021 | To amend the Public Health Service Act to authorize a public education campaign across all relevant programs of the Health Resources and Services Administration to increase oral health literacy and awareness. |
| H.R. 4591 | July 21, 2021 | (No short title) | To direct the Secretary of Veterans Affairs to submit to Congress periodic reports on the costs, performance metrics, and outcomes of the Department of Veterans Affairs Electronic Health Record Modernization program. |
| H.R. 4611 | July 21, 2021 | DHS Software Supply Chain Risk Management Act of 2021 | To direct the Secretary of Homeland Security to issue guidance with respect to certain information and communications technology or services contracts, and for other purposes. |
| H.R. 4616 | July 22, 2021 | Adjustable Interest Rate (LIBOR) Act of 2021 | To deem certain references to LIBOR as referring to a replacement benchmark rate upon the occurrence of certain events affecting LIBOR, and for other purposes. |
| H.R. 4626 | July 22, 2021 | VA AIM Act | To amend title 38, United States Code, to require an independent assessment of health care delivery systems and management processes of the Department of Veterans Affairs be conducted once every 10 years, and for other purposes. |
| H.R. 4673 | July 22, 2021 | EVEST Act | To amend title 38, United States Code, to provide for the automatic enrollment of eligible veterans in patient enrollment system of Department of Veterans Affairs, and for other purposes. |
| H.R. 4679 | July 26, 2021 | (No short title) | To designate the Federal building located at 1200 New Jersey Avenue Southeast in Washington, DC, as the "Norman Yoshio Mineta Federal Building". |
| H.R. 4682 | July 26, 2021 | UAS Act | To prohibit the Secretary of Homeland Security from operating or procuring certain foreign-made unmanned aircraft systems, and for other purposes. |
| H.R. 4686 | July 26, 2021 | Cambodia Democracy Act of 2021 | To promote free and fair elections, political freedoms, and human rights in Cambodia, and for other purposes. |
| H.R. 4706 | July 27, 2021 | Blackwell School National Historic Site Act | To establish the Blackwell School National Historic Site in Marfa, Texas, and for other purposes. |
| H.R. 4881 | July 30, 2021 | Old Pascua Community Land Acquisition Act | To direct the Secretary of the Interior to take into trust for the Pascua Yaqui Tribe of Arizona certain land in Pima County, Arizona, and for other purposes. |
| H.R. 4996 | August 10, 2021 | Ocean Shipping Reform Act of 2021 | To amend title 46, United States Code, with respect to prohibited acts by ocean common carriers or marine terminal operators, and for other purposes. |
| H.R. 5119 | August 27, 2021 | (No short title) | To amend title VI of the Social Security Act to extend the coverage of Coronavirus Relief Fund payments to Tribal Governments. |
| H.R. 5221 | September 10, 2021 | Urban Indian Health Confer Act | To amend the Indian Health Care Improvement Act to establish an urban Indian organization confer policy for the Department of Health and Human Services. |
| H.R. 5290 | September 17, 2021 | (No short title) | To extend authorization for livestock mandatory reporting. |
| H.R. 5314 | September 21, 2021 | Protecting Our Democracy Act | To protect our democracy by preventing abuses of presidential power, restoring checks and balances and accountability and transparency in government, and defending elections against foreign interference, and for other purposes. |
| H.R. 5323 | September 22, 2021 | Iron Dome Supplemental Appropriations Act, 2022 | Making supplemental appropriations for the fiscal year ending September 30, 2022, and for other purposes. |
| H.R. 5376 | September 27, 2021 | Build Back Better Act | To provide for reconciliation pursuant to title II of S. Con. Res. 14. |
| H.R. 5487 | October 5, 2021 | SHINE for Autumn Act of 2021 | To improve research and data collection on stillbirths, and for other purposes. |
| H.R. 5516 | October 8, 2021 | VITAL Assessment Act | To direct the Secretary of Veterans Affairs to submit to Congress a report on the Veterans Integration to Academic Leadership program of the Department of Veterans Affairs, and for other purposes. |
| H.R. 5551 | October 12, 2021 | Improving the Health of Children Act | To amend title III of the Public Health Service Act to reauthorize the National Center on Birth Defects and Developmental Disabilities, and for other purposes. |
| H.R. 5561 | October 12, 2021 | Early Hearing Detection and Intervention Act of 2021 | To reauthorize a program for early detection, diagnosis, and treatment regarding deaf and hard-of-hearing newborns, infants, and young children, and for other purposes. |
| H.R. 5574 | October 12, 2021 | TRANSLATE Act | To require the TSA to develop a plan to ensure that TSA material disseminated in major airports can be better understood by more people accessing such airports, and for other purposes. |
| H.R. 5603 | October 15, 2021 | Protections for Student Veterans Act | To amend title 38, United States Code, to establish protections for a member of the Armed Forces who leaves a course of education, paid for with certain educational assistance, to perform certain service. |
| H.R. 5608 | October 19, 2021 | Chronic Wasting Disease Research and Management Act | To support research and state management efforts on chronic wasting disease. |
| H.R. 5609 | October 19, 2021 | Cattle Contract Library Act of 2021 | To amend the Agricultural Marketing Act of 1946, to establish a cattle contract library, and for other purposes. |
| H.R. 5615 | October 19, 2021 | Homeland Security Capabilities Preservation Act | To direct the Secretary of Homeland Security to submit a plan to make Federal assistance available to certain urban areas that previously received Urban Area Security Initiative funding to preserve homeland security capabilities, and for other purposes. |
| H.R. 5616 | October 19, 2021 | DHS Basic Training Accreditation Improvement Act of 2021 | To require reporting regarding accreditation of basic training programs of the Department of Homeland Security, and for other purposes. |
| H.R. 5652 | October 20, 2021 | DHS Acquisition Review Board Act of 2021 | To amend the Homeland Security Act of 2002 to establish the Acquisition Review Board in the Department of Homeland Security, and for other purposes. |
| H.R. 5661 | October 21, 2021 | Continued State Flexibility To Assist Older Foster Youth Act | To extend flexible use of John H. Chafee Foster Care Independence Program funding to address pandemic-related challenges for older foster youth. |
| H.R. 5665 | October 21, 2021 | Combating International Islamophobia Act | To establish in the Department of State the Office to Monitor and Combat Islamophobia, and for other purposes. |
| H.R. 5671 | October 21, 2021 | (No short title) | To authorize the Secretary of Veterans Affairs to furnish seasonal influenza vaccines to certain individuals, and for other purposes. |
| H.R. 5677 | October 22, 2021 | (No short title) | To make technical amendments to update statutory references to certain provisions classified to title 2, United States Code, title 50, United States Code, and title 52, United States Code. |
| H.R. 5679 | October 22, 2021 | (No short title) | To make technical amendments to update statutory references to certain provisions classified to title 7, title 20, and title 43, United States Code. |
| H.R. 5695 | October 22, 2021 | (No short title) | To make technical amendments to update statutory references to certain provisions which were formerly classified to chapters 14 and 19 of title 25, United States Code. |
| H.R. 5705 | October 25, 2021 | (No short title) | To make technical amendments to update statutory references to provisions reclassified to title 34, United States Code. |
| H.R. 5720 | October 25, 2021 | Courthouse Ethics and Transparency Act of 2021 | To amend the Ethics in Government Act of 1978 to provide for a periodic transaction reporting requirement for Federal judicial officers and the online publication of financial disclosure reports of Federal judicial officers, and for other purposes. |
| H.R. 5961 | November 12, 2021 | (No short title) | To make revisions in title 5, United States Code, as necessary to keep the title current, and to make technical amendments to improve the United States Code. |
| H.R. 5982 | November 16, 2021 | (No short title) | To make revisions in title 51, United States Code, as necessary to keep the title current, and to make technical amendments to improve the United States Code. |

=== Passed by the House, no Senate consent needed ===
| H.R. number | Date of introduction | Description |
|---|---|---|
| H.Res. 1 | January 3, 2021 | Authorizing and directing the Speaker to administer the oath of office. |
| H.Res. 2 | January 3, 2021 | Electing officers of the House of Representatives. |
| H.Res. 3 | January 3, 2021 | To inform the Senate that a quorum of the House has assembled and of the election of the Speaker and the Clerk. |
| H.Res. 4 | January 3, 2021 | Authorizing the Speaker to appoint a committee to notify the President of the assembly of the Congress. |
| H.Res. 5 | January 3, 2021 | Authorizing the Clerk to inform the President of the election of the Speaker and the Clerk. |
| H.Res. 6 | January 3, 2021 | Providing for the designation of certain minority employees. |
| H.Res. 7 | January 3, 2021 | Authorizing the Speaker to administer the oath of office. |
| H.Res. 8 | January 4, 2021 | Adopting the Rules of the House of Representatives of the One Hundred Seventeenth Congress, and for other purposes. |
| H.Res. 9 | January 4, 2021 | Electing Members to certain standing committees of the House of Representatives. |
| H.Res. 10 | January 4, 2021 | Electing Members to certain standing committees of the House of Representatives. |
| H.Res. 11 | January 4, 2021 | Fixing the daily hour of meeting of the First Session of the One Hundred Seventeenth Congress. |
| H.Res. 21 | January 11, 2021 | Calling on Vice President Michael R. Pence to convene and mobilize the principal officers of the executive departments of the Cabinet to activate section 4 of the 25th Amendment to declare President Donald J. Trump incapable of executing the duties of his office and to immediately exercise powers as acting President. |
| H.Res. 22 | January 11, 2021 | Electing a Member to a certain standing committee of the House of Representatives. |
| H.Res. 23 | January 11, 2021 | Electing a Member to a certain standing committee of the House of Representatives. |
| H.Res. 24 | January 11, 2021 | Impeaching Donald John Trump, President of the United States, for high crimes and misdemeanors. |
| H.Res. 35 | January 12, 2021 | Electing Members to certain standing committees of the House of Representatives. |
| H.Res. 36 | January 12, 2021 | Electing Members to certain standing committees of the House of Representatives. |
| H.Res. 38 | January 12, 2021 | Providing for consideration of the resolution (H. Res. 21) calling on Vice President Michael R. Pence to convene and mobilize the principal officers of the executive departments of the Cabinet to activate section 4 of the 25th Amendment to declare President Donald J. Trump incapable of executing the duties of his office and to immediately exercise powers as acting President; and for other purposes. |
| H.Res. 40 | January 12, 2021 | Appointing and authorizing managers for the impeachment trial of Donald John Trump, President of the United States. |
| H.Res. 41 | January 12, 2021 | Providing for consideration of the resolution (H. Res. 24) impeaching Donald John Trump, President of the United States, for high crimes and misdemeanors. |
| H.Res. 62 | January 28, 2021 | Electing Members to certain standing committees of the House of Representatives. |
| H.Res. 63 | January 28, 2021 | Electing Members to certain standing committees of the House of Representatives. |
| H.Res. 72 | February 1, 2021 | Removing a certain Member from certain standing committees of the House of Representatives. |
| H.Res. 73 | February 1, 2021 | Providing the Sergeant-at-Arms with the authority to fine Members, Delegates, or the Resident Commissioner for failure to complete security screening for entrance to the House Chamber, and for other purposes. |
| H.Res. 85 | February 2, 2021 | Providing for consideration of the bill (H.R. 447) to amend the Act of August 16, 1937 (commonly referred to as the "National Apprenticeship Act") and expand the national apprenticeship system to include apprenticeships, youth apprenticeships, and pre-apprenticeship registered under such Act, to promote the furtherance of labor standards necessary to safeguard the welfare of apprentices, and for other purposes; providing for consideration of the concurrent resolution (H. Con. Res. 11) establishing the congressional budget for the United States Government for fiscal year 2021 and setting forth the appropriate budgetary levels for fiscal years 2022 through 2030; and for other purposes. |
| H.Res. 91 | February 3, 2021 | Providing for consideration of the Resolution (H. Res. 72) removing a certain Member from certain standing committees of the House of Representatives. |
| H.Res. 92 | February 3, 2021 | Electing Members to certain standing committees of the House of Representatives. |
| H.Res. 95 | February 4, 2021 | Electing Members to certain standing committees of the House of Representatives. |
| H.Res. 101 | February 5, 2021 | Providing for the adoption of the concurrent resolution (S. Con. Res. 5) setting forth the congressional budget for the United States Government for fiscal year 2021 and setting forth the appropriate budgetary levels for fiscal years 2022 through 2030. |
| H.Res. 111 | February 11, 2021 | Electing Members to certain standing committees of the House of Representatives. |
| H.Res. 122 | February 15, 2021 | Electing a Member to a certain standing committee of the House of Representatives. |
| H.Res. 130 | February 18, 2021 | Condemning the continued violation of rights and freedoms of the people of Hong Kong by the People's Republic of China and the Government of the Hong Kong Special Administrative Region. |
| H.Res. 134 | February 18, 2021 | Condemning the military coup that took place on February 1, 2021, in Burma and the Burmese military detention of civilian leaders, calling for the release of all those detained and for those elected to serve in Parliament to resume their duties, and for other purposes. |
| H.Res. 146 | February 23, 2021 | Electing a Member to a certain standing committee of the House of Representatives. |
| H.Res. 147 | February 23, 2021 | Providing for consideration of the bill (H.R. 803) to designate certain lands in the State of Colorado as components of the National Wilderness Preservation System, and for other purposes, and providing for consideration of the bill (H.R. 5) to prohibit discrimination on the basis of sex, gender identity, and sexual orientation, and for other purposes. |
| H.Res. 154 | February 24, 2021 | Electing a Member to a certain standing committee of the House of Representatives. |
| H.Res. 155 | February 24, 2021 | Expressing the profound sorrow of the House of Representatives on the death of the Honorable Ronald J. Wright. |
| H.Res. 166 | February 26, 2021 | Providing for consideration of the bill (H.R. 1319) to provide for reconciliation pursuant to title II of S. Con. Res. 5. |
| H.Res. 176 | March 1, 2021 | Directing the Clerk of the House of Representatives to make a correction in the engrossment of H.R. 1319. |
| H.Res. 177 | March 1, 2021 | Authorizing candidates for election to the House of Representatives and Members of the House of Representatives to file statements with the Clerk regarding the intention to participate or not participate in the small donor financing system for such elections under title V of the Federal Election Campaign Act of 1971. |
| H.Res. 688 | September 29, 2021 | Providing for consideration of the bill (S. 1301) to provide for the publication by the Secretary of Health and Human Services of physical activity recommendations for Americans. |
| H.Res. 716 | October 12, 2021 | Providing for consideration of the bill (H.R. 2119) to amend the Family Violence Prevention and Services Act to make improvements; providing for consideration of the bill (H.R. 3110) to amend the Fair Labor Standards Act of 1938 to expand access to breastfeeding accommodations in the workplace, and for other purposes; providing for consideration of the bill (H.R. 3992) to amend the Age Discrimination in Employment Act of 1967 to prohibit employers from limiting, segregating, or classifying applicants for employment; relating to consideration of the Senate amendment to the House amendment to the bill (S. 1301) to provide for the publication by the Secretary of Health and Human Services of physical activity recommendations for Americans; and for other purposes. |
| H.Res. 789 | November 12, 2021 | Censuring Representative Paul Gosar. |

=== Incorporated into enacted legislation ===
| H.R. number | Date of introduction | Short title | Description | Incorporated into |
|---|---|---|---|---|
| H.R. 22 | January 4, 2021 | Congressional Budget Justification Transparency Act of 2021 | To amend the Federal Funding Accountability and Transparency Act of 2006, to require the budget justifications and appropriation requests of agencies be made publicly available. | S. 272 |
| H.R. 438 | January 21, 2021 | (No short title) | To amend the Alyce Spotted Bear and Walter Soboleff Commission on Native Children Act to extend the deadline for a report by the Alyce Spotted Bear and Walter Soboleff Commission on Native Children, and for other purposes. | S. 325 |
| H.R. 637 | February 1, 2021 | Veterans Economic Recovery Act of 2021 | To direct the Secretary of Veterans Affairs to provide retraining assistance to certain veterans unemployed by reason of the COVID-19 public health emergency. | H.R. 1319 |
| H.R. 926 | February 8, 2021 | (No short title) | To provide emergency funding for home visiting programs during the pandemic, and for other purposes. | H.R. 1319 |
| H.R. 942 | February 8, 2021 | (No short title) | To amend the Internal Revenue Code of 1986 to provide for the application of the premium tax credit in the case of certain individuals who are unemployed during 2021. | H.R. 1319 |
| H.R. 1139 | February 18, 2021 | Feeding Homeless Youth During COVID-19 Act | To reimburse meals and supplements provided to individuals who have not attained the age of 25 under certain meal programs authorized under the Richard B. Russell National School Lunch Act, and for other purposes. | H.R. 1319 |
| H.R. 2746 | April 21, 2021 | (No short title) | To amend title 28, United States Code, to redefine the eastern and middle judicial districts of North Carolina. | S. 1340 |
| H.R. 5027 | August 13, 2021 | Automatic Relief for Taxpayers Affected by Major Disasters and Critical Events Act | To amend the Internal Revenue Code of 1986 to provide relief for taxpayers affected by disasters or other critical events. | H.R. 3684 |
| H.R. 5059 | August 20, 2021 | Make It in America Act | To amend chapter 83 of title 41, United States Code, to increase the requirement for American-made content, to strengthen the waiver provisions, and for other purposes. | H.R. 3684 |
| H.R. 5082 | August 23, 2021 | Cryptocurrency Tax Clarity Act | To amend the Internal Revenue Code of 1986 to clarify the definition of a broker, and for other purposes. | H.R. 3684 |
| H.R. 5083 | August 23, 2021 | Cryptocurrency Tax Reform Act | To amend the Internal Revenue Code of 1986 to clarify the definition of a broker, and for other purposes. | H.R. 3684 |
| H.R. 6343 | December 23, 2021 | Illicit Finance Improvements Act | To expand the scope of the meetings of the supervisory team on countering illicit finance, to improve the combating of Russian money laundering, and for other purposes. | S. 1605 |

=== Other legislation ===
Due to size constraints, this list only includes bills that have been considered by a committee.

| H.R. number | Date of introduction | Short title | Description |
|---|---|---|---|
| H.R. 3 | April 22, 2021 | Elijah E. Cummings Lower Drug Costs Now Act | To establish a fair price negotiation program, protect the Medicare program from excessive price increases, and establish an out-of-pocket maximum for Medicare part D enrollees, and for other purposes. |
| H.R. 18 | February 5, 2021 | No Taxpayer Funding for Abortion and Abortion Insurance Full Disclosure Act of 2021 | To prohibit taxpayer funded abortions. |
| H.R. 24 | January 4, 2021 | Federal Reserve Transparency Act of 2021 | To require a full audit of the Board of Governors of the Federal Reserve System and the Federal reserve banks by the Comptroller General of the United States, and for other purposes. |
| H.R. 25 | January 4, 2021 | FairTax Act of 2021 | To promote freedom, fairness, and economic opportunity by repealing the income tax and other taxes, abolishing the Internal Revenue Service, and enacting a national sales tax to be administered primarily by the States. |
| H.R. 28 | January 4, 2021 | Protecting Life in Crisis Act | This bill specifies that federal funds allocated for COVID-19 (i.e., coronavirus disease 2019) response efforts may not, in general, be used for abortions. Current law (specifically, language that has historically been included in certain appropriations bills, commonly referred to as the Hyde Amendment) generally prohibits the use of federal funds for abortions. The bill also restricts the use of federal tax credits or other federal funding for health insurance coverage if the coverage includes abortions. |
| H.R. 29 | January 4, 2021 | Defund National Endowment for the Humanities Act of 2021 | To provide that none of the funds made available to the National Endowment for the Humanities for any fiscal year may be used to carry out section 7 of the National Foundation on the Arts and the Humanities Act of 1965. |
| H.R. 31 | January 4, 2021 | Health Coverage Choice Act | To amend title XXVII of the Public Health Service Act to provide for a definition of short-term limited duration insurance, and for other purposes. |
| H.R. 34 | January 4, 2021 | Let Lenders Lend Act | To provide that the final rule of the Bureau of Consumer Financial Protection titled "Home Mortgage Disclosure (Regulation C)" shall have no force or effect. |
| H.R. 40 | January 4, 2021 | Commission to Study and Develop Reparation Proposals for African Americans Act | This bill establishes the Commission to Study and Develop Reparation Proposals for African Americans. The commission shall examine slavery and discrimination in the colonies and the United States from 1619 to the present and recommend appropriate remedies. The commission shall identify (1) the role of the federal and state governments in supporting the institution of slavery, (2) forms of discrimination in the public and private sectors against freed slaves and their descendants, and (3) lingering negative effects of slavery on living African Americans and society. |
| H.R. 43 | January 4, 2021 | Injunctive Authority Clarification Act of 2021 | To amend title 28, United States Code, to prohibit the issuance of national injunctions, and for other purposes. |
| H.R. 47 | January 4, 2021 | (No short title) | To amend title 54, United States Code, to increase public access to recreational areas on Federal land. |
| H.R. 147 | January 4, 2021 | BRAVE Act | To amend titles 10 and 38, United States Code, to make certain improvements to transitional services for separating members of the Armed Forces and educational assistance under laws administered by the Secretary of Veterans Affairs, and for other purposes. |
| H.R. 153 | January 4, 2021 | Protecting Consumer Access to Generic Drugs Act of 2021 | To prohibit brand name drug manufacturers from compensating generic drug manufacturers to delay the entry of a generic drug into the market, and to prohibit biological product manufacturers from compensating biosimilar and interchangeable product manufacturers to delay entry of biosimilar and interchangeable products, and for other purposes. |
| H.R. 160 | January 4, 2021 | Restoring Resilient Reefs Act of 2021 | To reauthorize the Coral Reef Conservation Act of 2000 and to establish the United States Coral Reef Task Force, and for other purposes. |
| H.R. 164 | January 4, 2021 | (No short title) | To authorize the Seminole Tribe of Florida to lease or transfer certain land, and for other purposes. |
| H.R. 166 | January 4, 2021 | Fair Lending for All Act | To establish an Office of Fair Lending Testing to test for compliance with the Equal Credit Opportunity Act, to strengthen the Equal Credit Opportunity Act and to provide for criminal penalties for violating such Act, and for other purposes. |
| H.R. 187 | January 4, 2021 | (No short title) | For the relief of Victoria Galindo Lopez. |
| H.R. 207 | January 5, 2021 | (No short title) | To designate the facility of the United States Postal Service located at 215 1st Avenue in Amory, Mississippi, as the "Command Sergeant Major Lawrence E. 'Rabbit' Kennedy Post Office Building". |
| H.R. 209 | January 5, 2021 | (No short title) | To designate the facility of the United States Postal Service located at 305 Highway 15 North in Pontotoc, Mississippi, as the "Lance Corporal Marc Lucas Tucker Post Office Building". |
| H.R. 234 | January 6, 2021 | Korean American VALOR Act | To amend title 38, United States Code, to treat certain individuals who served in Vietnam as a member of the armed forces of the Republic of Korea as a veteran of the Armed Forces of the United States for purposes of the provision of health care by the Department of Veterans Affairs. |
| H.R. 235 | January 6, 2021 | Public Housing Emergency Response Act | To authorize additional monies to the Public Housing Capital Fund of the Department of Housing and Urban Development, and for other purposes. |
| H.R. 267 | January 11, 2021 | 2020 WHIP+ Reauthorization Act | To extend the wildfire and hurricane indemnity program to cover certain crop losses in calendar year 2020, and for other purposes. |
| H.R. 279 | January 12, 2021 | Roadless Area Conservation Act of 2021 | To provide lasting protection for inventoried roadless areas within the National Forest System. |
| H.R. 293 | January 13, 2021 | VA Hospitals Establishing Leadership Performance Act | To direct the Secretary of Veterans Affairs to establish qualifications for the human resources positions within the Veterans Health Administration of the Department of Veterans Affairs, and for other purposes. |
| H.R. 302 | January 13, 2021 | PPSA Act | To impose limits on excepting competitive service positions from the competitive service, and for other purposes. |
| H.R. 344 | January 19, 2021 | Women Veterans TRUST Act | To direct the Secretary of Veterans Affairs to conduct an analysis of the need for women-specific programs that treat and rehabilitate women veterans with drug and alcohol dependency and to carry out a pilot program regarding such programs. |
| H.R. 367 | January 19, 2021 | Homeland Security Acquisition Professional Career Program Act | To amend the Homeland Security Act of 2002 to establish an acquisition professional career program, and for other purposes. |
| H.R. 379 | January 21, 2021 | Improving Social Determinants of Health Act of 2021 | To authorize the Director of the Centers for Disease Control and Prevention to carry out a Social Determinants of Health Program, and for other purposes. |
| H.R. 390 | January 21, 2021 | (No short title) | To redesignate the Federal building located at 167 North Main Street in Memphis, Tennessee as the "Odell Horton Federal Building". |
| H.R. 402 | January 21, 2021 | CROOK Act | To promote international efforts in combating corruption, kleptocracy, and illicit finance by foreign officials and other foreign persons, including through a new anti-corruption action fund, and for other purposes. |
| H.R. 408 | January 21, 2021 | Department of Homeland Security Mentor-Protégé Program Act of 2021 | To amend the Homeland Security Act of 2002 to establish a mentor-protégé program, and for other purposes. |
| H.R. 437 | January 21, 2021 | (No short title) | To amend the Alaska Native Claims Settlement Act to exclude certain payments to Alaska Native elders for determining eligibility for certain programs, and for other purposes. |
| H.R. 438 | January 21, 2021 | (No short title) | To amend the Alyce Spotted Bear and Walter Soboleff Commission on Native Children Act to extend the deadline for a report by the Alyce Spotted Bear and Walter Soboleff Commission on Native Children, and for other purposes. |
| H.R. 441 | January 21, 2021 | (No short title) | To provide for the conveyance of certain property to the Tanana Tribal Council located in Tanana, Alaska, and for other purposes. |
| H.R. 442 | January 21, 2021 | Southeast Alaska Regional Health Consortium Land Transfer Act | To provide for the conveyance of certain property to the Southeast Alaska Regional Health Consortium located in Sitka, Alaska, and for other purposes. |
| H.R. 443 | January 21, 2021 | Alaska Native Tribal Health Consortium Land Transfer Act | To convey land in Anchorage, Alaska, to the Alaska Native Tribal Health Consortium, and for other purposes. |
| H.R. 496 | January 28, 2021 | Ukraine Religious Freedom Support Act | To oppose violations of religious freedom in Ukraine by Russia and armed groups commanded by Russia. |
| H.R. 501 | January 28, 2021 | Climate Smart Ports Act | To direct the Administrator of the Environmental Protection Agency to establish a program to award grants to eligible entities to purchase, and as applicable install, zero emissions port equipment and technology, and for other purposes. |
| H.R. 507 | January 28, 2021 | Innovative Energy Manufacturing Act of 2021 | To amend the Internal Revenue Code of 1986 to extend the advanced energy project credit. |
| H.R. 516 | January 28, 2021 | Environmental Justice Mapping and Data Collection Act of 2021 | To establish the Environmental Justice Mapping Committee, and for other purposes. |
| H.R. 564 | January 28, 2021 | Comprehensive Paid Leave for Federal Employees Act | To provide paid family and medical leave to Federal employees, and for other purposes. |
| H.R. 570 | January 28, 2021 | Offshore Accountability Act of 2021 | To require operators of offshore oil and gas facilities to report failures of critical systems to the Secretary of the Interior, and for other purposes. |
| H.R. 587 | January 28, 2021 | Ocean Pollution Reduction Act II | To modify permitting requirements with respect to the discharge of any pollutant from the Point Loma Wastewater Treatment Plant in certain circumstances, and for other purposes. |
| H.R. 610 | January 28, 2021 | San Francisco Bay Restoration Act | To amend the Federal Water Pollution Control Act to establish a grant program to support the restoration of San Francisco Bay. |
| H.R. 612 | January 28, 2021 | Downwinders Parity Act of 2021 | To amend the Radiation Exposure Compensation Act to include certain communities, and for other purposes. |
| H.R. 616 | January 28, 2021 | Emergency Water is a Human Right Act | To prohibit water shutoffs during the COVID-19 emergency period, provide drinking and waste water assistance to households, and for other purposes. |
| H.R. 623 | January 28, 2021 | Gabriella Miller Kids First Research Act 2.0 | To require certain civil penalties to be transferred to a fund through which amounts are made available for the Gabriella Miller Kids First Pediatric Research Program at the National Institutes of Health, and for other purposes. |
| H.R. 658 | February 1, 2021 | District of Columbia Parole and Supervised Release Act | To transfer from the United States Parole Commission to the District of Columbia the authority to grant, deny, and revoke parole and impose conditions on an order of parole, and the authority to modify, revoke, and terminate a term of supervised release and impose conditions on an order of supervised release, in the case of individuals who are imprisoned felons eligible for parole, reparole, or supervised release under the laws of the District of Columbia, and for other purposes. |
| H.R. 660 | February 1, 2021 | Shovel-Ready Restoration Grants for Coastlines and Fisheries Act of 2021 | To require the Secretary of Commerce to establish a grant program to benefit coastal habitats, resiliency, and the economy, and for other purposes. |
| H.R. 666 | February 1, 2021 | Anti-Racism in Public Health Act of 2021 | To amend the Public Health Service Act to provide for public health research and investment into understanding and eliminating structural racism and police violence. |
| H.R. 667 | February 1, 2021 | Desert Sage Youth Wellness Center Access Improvement Act | To authorize the Secretary of Health and Human Services, acting through the Director of the Indian Health Service, to acquire private land to facilitate access to the Desert Sage Youth Wellness Center in Hemet, California, and for other purposes. |
| H.R. 680 | February 1, 2021 | (No short title) | For the relief of Arpita Kurdekar, Girish Kurdekar, and Vandana Kurdekar. |
| H.R. 681 | February 1, 2021 | (No short title) | For the relief of Rebecca Trimble. |
| H.R. 700 | February 2, 2021 | (No short title) | To designate the facility of the United States Postal Service located at 303 East Mississippi Avenue in Elwood, Illinois, as the "Lawrence M. 'Larry' Walsh Sr. Post Office". |
| H.R. 704 | February 2, 2021 | ARTS Act | To amend section 708 of title 17, United States Code, to permit the Register of Copyrights to waive fees for filing an application for registration of a copyright claim in certain circumstances, and for other purposes. |
| H.R. 729 | February 2, 2021 | Strength in Diversity Act of 2021 | To establish the Strength in Diversity Program, and for other purposes. |
| H.R. 730 | February 2, 2021 | Equity and Inclusion Enforcement Act of 2021 | To amend title VI of the Civil Rights Act of 1964 to restore the right to individual civil actions in cases involving disparate impact, and for other purposes. |
| H.R. 735 | February 2, 2021 | (No short title) | To designate the facility of the United States Postal Service located at 502 East Cotati Avenue in Cotati, California, as the "Arthur Luis Ibleto Post Office Building". |
| H.R. 739 | February 2, 2021 | (No short title) | For the relief of Median El-Moustrah. |
| H.R. 778 | February 3, 2021 | Secure Data and Privacy for Contact Tracing Act of 2021 | To authorize the Director of the Centers for Disease Control and Prevention to award grants to eligible State, Tribal, and territorial public health agencies to develop and administer a program for digital contact tracing for COVID-19, and for other purposes. |
| H.R. 785 | February 3, 2021 | (No short title) | For the relief of Maria Isabel Bueso Barrera, Alberto Bueso Mendoza, and Karla Maria Barrera De Bueso. |
| H.R. 791 | February 4, 2021 | Tracking COVID-19 Variants Act | To improve activities for the gathering of data on, and the tracking of, new variants of COVID-19. |
| H.R. 816 | February 4, 2021 | Restoring Communities Left Behind Act | To direct the Secretary of Housing and Urban Development to establish a grant program to help revitalize certain localities, and for other purposes. |
| H.R. 820 | February 4, 2021 | New Philadelphia National Historical Park Act | To establish the New Philadelphia National Historical Park in the State of Illinois as a unit of the National Park System, and for other purposes. |
| H.R. 831 | February 4, 2021 | Health STATISTICS Act of 2021 | To amend the Public Health Service Act to encourage the rapid development of certain public health data standards, authorize epidemiological surveillance grants, and authorize a data linkage demonstration project, and for other purposes. |
| H.R. 861 | February 5, 2021 | Alerting Localities of Environmental Risks and Threats Act of 2021 | To amend the Emergency Planning and Community Right-To-Know Act of 1986 to require an emergency notification meeting in the event of the release of an extremely hazardous substance from a facility, and for other purposes. |
| H.R. 862 | February 5, 2021 | Climate Action Planning for Ports Act of 2021 | To authorize the Administrator of the Environmental Protection Agency to award grants to eligible entities to reduce greenhouse gas emissions at ports, and for other purposes. |
| H.R. 866 | February 5, 2021 | FISH Act | To amend the Endangered Species Act of 1973 to vest in the Secretary of the Interior functions under that Act with respect to species of fish that spawn in fresh or estuarine waters and migrate to ocean waters, and species of fish that spawn in ocean waters and migrate to fresh waters. |
| H.R. 903 | February 5, 2021 | Rights for the TSA Workforce Act of 2021 | To enhance the security operations of the Transportation Security Administration and stability of the transportation security workforce by applying the personnel system under title 5, United States Code, to employees of the Transportation Security Administration who provide screening of all passengers and property, and for other purposes. |
| H.R. 912 | February 8, 2021 | American Indian and Alaska Native Veterans Mental Health Act | To direct the Secretary of Veterans Affairs to make certain improvements relating to mental health and suicide prevention outreach to minority veterans and American Indian and Alaska Native veterans, and for other purposes. |
| H.R. 913 | February 8, 2021 | Build a Better VA Act | To amend title 38, United States Code, to require congressional approval before the appropriation of funds for the Department of Veterans Affairs major medical facility leases. |
| H.R. 920 | February 8, 2021 | Brown v. Board of Education National Historic Site Expansion Act | To amend the Act entitled "Act to provide for the establishment of the Brown v. Board of Education National Historic Site in the State of Kansas, and for other purposes" to provide for inclusion of additional related sites in the National Park System, and for other purposes. |
| H.R. 922 | February 8, 2021 | Crimea Annexation Non-Recognition Act | To prohibit United States Government recognition of the Russian Federation's claim of sovereignty over Crimea, and for other purposes. |
| H.R. 925 | February 8, 2021 | Data to Save Moms Act | To amend the Public Health Service Act (42 U.S.C. 201 et seq.) to authorize funding for maternal mortality review committees to promote representative community engagement, and for other purposes. |
| H.R. 935 | February 8, 2021 | Small Business Mergers, Acquisitions, Sales, and Brokerage Simplification Act of 2021 | To amend the Securities Exchange Act of 1934 to exempt from registration brokers performing services in connection with the transfer of ownership of smaller privately held companies. |
| H.R. 943 | February 8, 2021 | Social Determinants for Moms Act | To address social determinants of maternal health with respect to pregnant and postpartum individuals, and for other purposes. |
| H.R. 955 | February 8, 2021 | Medicaid Reentry Act of 2021 | To amend title XIX of the Social Security Act to allow States to make medical assistance available to inmates during the 30-day period preceding their release. |
| H.R. 963 | February 11, 2021 | FAIR Act | To amend title 9 of the United States Code with respect to arbitration. |
| H.R. 965 | February 11, 2021 | YALI Act of 2021 | To establish a comprehensive United States Government initiative to build the capacity of young leaders and entrepreneurs in Africa, and for other purposes. |
| H.R. 972 | February 11, 2021 | Wildlife Refuge Conservation and Recreation for the Community Act | To establish the Western Riverside County Wildlife Refuge, and for other purposes. |
| H.R. 976 | February 11, 2021 | ETHIC Act | To amend the Public Health Service Act to expand, enhance, and improve applicable public health data systems used by the Centers for Disease Control and Prevention, and for other purposes. |
| H.R. 978 | February 11, 2021 | Chai Suthammanont Remembrance Act of 2021 | To require the head of each agency to establish a safety plan relating to COVID-19 for any worksite at which employees or contractors are required to be physically present during the COVID-19 pandemic, and for other purposes. |
| H.R. 979 | February 11, 2021 | Vaccine Fairness Act | To direct the Secretary of Health and Human Services to submit to Congress a weekly report on COVID-19 vaccine distribution, and for other purposes. |
| H.R. 998 | February 11, 2021 | Offshore Wind Jobs and Opportunity Act | To establish an offshore wind career training grant program, and for other purposes. |
| H.R. 1036 | February 11, 2021 | Bassam Barabandi Rewards for Justice Act | To amend the State Department Basic Authorities Act of 1956 to authorize rewards under the Department of State's rewards program relating to information regarding individuals or entities engaged in activities in contravention of United States or United Nations sanctions, and for other purposes. |
| H.R. 1042 | February 15, 2021 | Protecting Critical Infrastructure Act | To provide an enhanced general penalty for any person who willfully or maliciously destroys a communications facility. |
| H.R. 1046 | February 15, 2021 | Federal Broadband Deployment in Unserved Areas Act | To require the Federal Communications Commission to provide broadband availability data to the Department of the Interior. |
| H.R. 1049 | February 15, 2021 | Expediting Federal Broadband Deployment Reviews Act | To require the Assistant Secretary of Commerce for Communications and Information to establish an interagency strike force to increase prioritization by the Department of the Interior and Department of Agriculture by senior management of the Department of the Interior and Department of Agriculture, or an organizational unit of reviews for communications use authorizations. |
| H.R. 1058 | February 15, 2021 | Wireless Resiliency and Flexible Investment Act | To amend the Middle Class Tax Relief and Job Creation Act of 2012 to amend the definition of eligible facilities request, to codify the 60-day time frame for certain eligible facilities requests, and for other purposes. |
| H.R. 1066 | February 15, 2021 | Wildfire Recovery Act | To amend the Robert T. Stafford Disaster Relief and Emergency Assistance Act to provide flexibility with the cost share for fire management assistance, and for other purposes. |
| H.R. 1079 | February 15, 2021 | Desert Locust Control Act | To establish an interagency working group to develop a comprehensive, strategic plan to control locust outbreaks in the East Africa region and address future outbreaks in order to avert mass scale food insecurity and potential political destabilization, and for other purposes. |

== Introduced in the Senate ==
=== Passed by both houses, no presidential consent needed ===
| S. number | Date of introduction | Description |
|---|---|---|
| S.Con.Res. 1 | January 3, 2021 | A concurrent resolution to provide for the counting on January 6, 2021, of the electoral votes for President and Vice President of the United States. |
| S.Con.Res. 2 | January 3, 2021 | A concurrent resolution extending the life of the Joint Congressional Committee on Inaugural Ceremonies and authorizing the use of the rotunda and Emancipation Hall of the Capitol by the Joint Congressional Committee on Inaugural Ceremonies. |
| S.Con.Res. 5 | February 2, 2021 | A concurrent resolution setting forth the congressional budget for the United States Government for fiscal year 2021 and setting forth the appropriate budgetary levels for fiscal years 2022 through 2030. |
| S.Con.Res. 14 | August 9, 2021 | A concurrent resolution setting forth the congressional budget for the United States Government for fiscal year 2022 and setting forth the appropriate budgetary levels for fiscal years 2023 through 2031. |
| S.Con.Res. 22 | December 7, 2021 | A concurrent resolution providing for the use of the catafalque situated in the Exhibition Hall of the Capitol Visitor Center in connection with memorial services to be conducted in the rotunda of the Capitol for the Honorable Robert Joseph Dole, a Senator from the State of Kansas. |
| S.Con.Res. 23 | December 7, 2021 | A concurrent resolution authorizing the use of the rotunda of the Capitol for the lying in state of the remains of the Honorable Robert Joseph Dole, a Senator from the State of Kansas. |
| S.Con.Res. 24 | December 18, 2021 | A concurrent resolution directing the Secretary of the Senate to make corrections in the enrollment of the bill S. 1605. |
| S.Con.Res. 25 | January 5, 2022 | A concurrent resolution authorizing the use of the rotunda of the Capitol for the lying in state of the remains of the Honorable Harry Mason Reid, Jr., a Senator from the State of Nevada. |
| S.Con.Res. 26 | January 5, 2022 | A concurrent resolution providing for the use of the catafalque situated in the Exhibition Hall of the Capitol Visitor Center in connection with memorial services to be conducted in the rotunda of the Capitol for the Honorable Harry Mason Reid, Jr., a Senator from the State of Nevada. |

=== Passed by the Senate, waiting in the House ===
| S. number | Date of introduction | Short title | Description |
|---|---|---|---|
| S.Con.Res. 19 | November 3, 2021 | (No short title) | A concurrent resolution permitting the use of the rotunda of the Capitol for a ceremony as part of the commemoration of the 100th anniversary of the dedication of the Tomb of the Unknown Soldier. |
| S.Con.Res. 28 | January 20, 2022 | (No short title) | A concurrent resolution expressing the sense of Congress that September 30 should be observed as a national day of remembrance for the Native American children who died while attending a United States Indian boarding school and recognizing, honoring, and supporting the survivors of Indian boarding schools, their families, and their communities. |
| S.J.Res. 29 | November 17, 2021 | (No short title) | A joint resolution providing for congressional disapproval under chapter 8 of title 5, United States Code, of the rule submitted by the Department of Labor relating to "COVID-19 Vaccination and Testing; Emergency Temporary Standard". |
| S.J.Res. 32 | December 9, 2021 | (No short title) | A joint resolution providing for congressional disapproval under chapter 8 of title 5, United States Code, of the rule submitted by the Centers for Medicare & Medicaid Services relating to "Medicare and Medicaid Programs; Omnibus COVID-19 Health Care Staff Vaccination". |
| S. 35 | January 22, 2021 | Officer Eugene Goodman Congressional Gold Medal Act | A bill to award a Congressional Gold Medal to Officer Eugene Goodman. |
| S.J.Res. 38 | February 14, 2022 | (No short title) | A joint resolution relating to a national emergency declared by the President on March 13, 2020. |
| S. 198 | February 3, 2021 | Data Mapping to Save Moms' Lives Act | A bill to require the Federal Communications Commission to incorporate data on maternal health outcomes into its broadband health maps. |
| S. 231 | February 4, 2021 | Protecting Firefighters from Adverse Substances Act | A bill to direct the Administrator of the Federal Emergency Management Agency to develop guidance for firefighters and other emergency response personnel on best practices to protect them from exposure to PFAS and to limit and prevent the release of PFAS into the environment, and for other purposes. |
| S. 233 | February 4, 2021 | Donna M. Doss Memorial Act of 2021 | A bill to designate the Rocksprings Station of the U.S. Border Patrol located on West Main Street in Rocksprings, Texas, as the "Donna M. Doss Border Patrol Station". |
| S. 272 | February 8, 2021 | Congressional Budget Justification Transparency Act of 2021 | A bill to amend the Federal Funding Accountability and Transparency Act of 2006, to require the budget justifications and appropriation requests of agencies be made publicly available. |
| S. 273 | February 8, 2021 | Driftnet Modernization and Bycatch Reduction Act | A bill to improve the management of driftnet fishing. |
| S. 297 | February 8, 2021 | Reinforcing American-Made Products Act | A bill to make exclusive the authority of the Federal Government to regulate the labeling of products made in the United States and introduced in interstate or foreign commerce, and for other purposes. |
| S. 320 | February 12, 2021 | John Lewis NIMHD Research Endowment Revitalization Act of 2021 | A bill to amend the Public Health Service Act to provide that the authority of the Director of the National Institute on Minority Health and Health Disparities to make certain research endowments applies with respect to both current and former centers of excellence, and for other purposes. |
| S. 400 | February 24, 2021 | William T. Coleman, Jr., Department of Transportation Headquarters Act | A bill to designate the headquarters building of the Department of Transportation located at 1200 New Jersey Avenue, SE, in Washington, DC, as the "William T. Coleman, Jr., Federal Building". |
| S. 409 | February 24, 2021 | (No short title) | A bill to provide for the availability of amounts for customer education initiatives and non-awards expenses of the Commodity Futures Trading Commission Whistleblower Program, and for other purposes. |
| S. 450 | February 25, 2021 | Emmett Till and Mamie Till-Mobley Congressional Gold Medal Act of 2021 | A bill to award posthumously the Congressional Gold Medal to Emmett Till and Mamie Till-Mobley. |
| S. 503 | March 1, 2021 | PARENTS Act of 2021 | A bill to amend part D of title IV of the Social Security Act to allow States to use incentive payments available under the child support enforcement program to improve parent-child relationships, increase child support collections, and improve outcomes for children by supporting parenting time agreements for noncustodial parents in uncontested agreements, and for other purposes. |
| S. 534 | March 2, 2021 | Tribal Child Support Enforcement Act | A bill to improve the effectiveness of tribal child support enforcement agencies, and for other purposes. |
| S. 554 | March 2, 2021 | (No short title) | A bill to direct the Secretary of Veterans Affairs to designate one week each year as "Buddy Check Week" for the purpose of outreach and education concerning peer wellness checks for veterans, and for other purposes. |
| S. 558 | March 3, 2021 | FLOODS Act | A bill to establish a national integrated flood information system within the National Oceanic and Atmospheric Administration, and for other purposes. |
| S. 590 | March 4, 2021 | Concerns Over Nations Funding University Campus Institutes in the United States Act (CONFUCIUS Act) | A bill to establish limitations regarding Confucius Institutes, and for other purposes. |
| S. 593 | March 4, 2021 | Alaska Tourism Restoration Act | A bill to restrict the imposition by the Secretary of Homeland Security of fines, penalties, duties, or tariffs applicable only to coastwise voyages, or prohibit otherwise qualified non-United States citizens from serving as crew, on specified vessels transporting passengers between the State of Washington and the State of Alaska, to address a Canadian cruise ship ban and the extraordinary impacts of the COVID-19 pandemic on Alaskan communities, and for other purposes. |
| S. 693 | March 10, 2021 | No CORRUPTION Act | To amend title 5, United States Code, to provide for the halt in pension payments for Members of Congress sentenced for certain offenses, and for other purposes. |
| S. 812 | March 17, 2021 | (No short title) | A bill to direct the Secretary of State to develop a strategy to regain observer status for Taiwan in the World Health Organization, and for other purposes. |
| S. 914 | March 23, 2021 | Drinking Water and Wastewater Infrastructure Act of 2021 | A bill to amend the Safe Drinking Water Act and the Federal Water Pollution Control Act to reauthorize programs under those Acts, and for other purposes. |
| S. 1037 | March 25, 2021 | Manufacturing.gov Act | A bill to provide for the establishment of a section of the website of the Department of Commerce that shall serve as the primary hub for information relating to Federal manufacturing programs, and for other purposes. |
| S. 1041 | March 25, 2021 | RENACER Act | A bill to advance the strategic alignment of United States diplomatic tools toward the realization of free, fair, and transparent elections in Nicaragua and to reaffirm the commitment of the United States to protect the fundamental freedoms and human rights of the people of Nicaragua, and for other purposes. |
| S. 1046 | March 25, 2021 | Residential Substance Use Disorder Treatment Act of 2021 | A bill to amend the Omnibus Crime Control and Safe Streets Act of 1968 to reauthorize the residential substance use disorder treatment program, and for other purposes. |
| S. 1097 | April 13, 2021 | Federal Rotational Cyber Workforce Program Act of 2021 | A bill to establish a Federal rotational cyber workforce program for the Federal cyber workforce. |
| S. 1226 | April 20, 2021 | (No short title) | A bill to designate the United States courthouse located at 1501 North 6th Street in Harrisburg, Pennsylvania, as the "Sylvia H. Rambo United States Courthouse", and for other purposes. |
| S. 1251 | April 20, 2021 | Growing Climate Solutions Act of 2021 | A bill to authorize the Secretary of Agriculture to develop a program to reduce barriers to entry for farmers, ranchers, and private forest landowners in certain voluntary markets, and for other purposes. |
| S. 1260 | April 20, 2021 | U.S. Innovation and Competition Act | A bill to establish a new Directorate for Technology and Innovation in the National Science Foundation, to establish a regional technology hub program, to require a strategy and report on economic security, science, research, innovation, manufacturing, and job creation, to establish a critical supply chain resiliency program, and for other purposes. |
| S. 1301 | April 22, 2021 | Promoting Physical Activity for Americans Act | A bill to provide for the publication by the Secretary of Health and Human Services of physical activity recommendations for Americans. |
| S. 1585 | May 12, 2021 | Improving Mental Health Access for Students Act | A bill to add suicide prevention resources to school identification cards. |
| S. 1760 | May 20, 2021 | (No short title) | A bill to designate the community-based outpatient clinic of the Department of Veterans Affairs planned to be built in Oahu, Hawaii, as the "Daniel Kahikina Akaka Department of Veterans Affairs Community-Based Outpatient Clinic". |
| S. 1872 | May 27, 2021 | United States Army Rangers Veterans of World War II Congressional Gold Medal Act | A bill to award a Congressional Gold Medal, collectively, to the United States Army Rangers Veterans of World War II in recognition of their extraordinary service during World War II. |
| S. 2045 | June 14, 2021 | (No short title) | A bill to designate the area between the intersections of 16th Street, Northwest and Fuller Street, Northwest and 16th Street, Northwest and Euclid Street, Northwest in Washington, District of Columbia, as "Oswaldo Payá Way". |
| S. 2089 | June 16, 2021 | Burial Equity for Guards and Reserves Act of 2021 | A bill to amend title 38, United States Code, to ensure that grants provided by the Secretary of Veterans Affairs for State veterans' cemeteries do not restrict States from authorizing the interment of certain deceased members of the reserve components of the Armed Forces in such cemeteries, and for other purposes. |
| S. 2126 | June 17, 2021 | (No short title) | A bill to designate the Federal Office Building located at 308 W. 21st Street in Cheyenne, Wyoming, as the "Louisa Swain Federal Office Building", and for other purposes. |
| S. 2184 | June 22, 2021 | (No short title) | A bill to amend the Sarbanes-Oxley Act of 2002 to institute a trading prohibition for certain issuers that retain public accounting firms that have not been subject to inspection by the Public Company Accounting Oversight Board, and for other purposes. |
| S. 2201 | June 23, 2021 | Supply Chain Security Training Act of 2021 | A bill to manage supply chain risk through counterintelligence training, and for other purposes. |
| S. 2205 | June 24, 2021 | (No short title) | A bill to designate the United States courthouse located at 201 South Evans Street in Greenville, North Carolina, as the "Malcolm J. Howard United States Courthouse", and for other purposes. |
| S. 2255 | June 24, 2021 | Trade Adjustment Assistance Extension Act of 2021 | A bill to extend the trade adjustment assistance program for one month. |
| S. 2293 | June 24, 2021 | CREW Act | A bill to amend the Robert T. Stafford Disaster Relief and Emergency Assistance Act to provide certain employment rights to reservists of the Federal Emergency Management Agency, and for other purposes. |
| S. 2382 | July 19, 2021 | (No short title) | A bill to authorize the National Cyber Director to accept details from other elements of the Federal Government on nonreimbursable basis, and for other purposes. |
| S. 2514 | July 28, 2021 | (No short title) | To rename the Provo Veterans Center in Orem, Utah, as the "Col. Gail S. Halvorsen 'Candy Bomber' Veterans Center". |
| S. 2520 | July 28, 2021 | State and Local Government Cybersecurity Act of 2021 | A bill to amend the Homeland Security Act of 2002 to provide for engagements with State, local, Tribal, and territorial governments, and for other purposes. |
| S. 2629 | August 5, 2021 | Better Cybercrime Metrics Act | A bill to establish cybercrime reporting mechanisms, and for other purposes. |
| S. 2796 | September 22, 2021 | Rural Opioid Abuse Prevention Act | A bill to amend the Omnibus Crime Control and Safe Streets Act of 1968 to provide for the eligibility of rural community response pilot programs for funding under the Comprehensive Opioid Abuse Grant Program, and for other purposes. |
| S. 2899 | September 29, 2021 | Prison Camera Reform Act of 2021 | A bill to require the Director of the Bureau of Prisons to address deficiencies and make necessary upgrades to the security camera and radio systems of the Bureau of Prisons to ensure the health and safety of employees and inmates. |
| S. 2923 | September 30, 2021 | Fishery Resource Disasters Improvement Act | A bill to improve the Fishery Resource Disaster Relief program of the National Marine Fisheries Service, and for other purposes. |
| S. 2938 | October 5, 2021 | (No short title) | A bill to designate the United States Courthouse and Federal Building located at 111 North Adams Street in Tallahassee, Florida, as the "Joseph Woodrow Hatchett United States Courthouse and Federal Building", and for other purposes. |
| S. 3011 | October 19, 2021 | (No short title) | A bill to amend title VI of the Social Security Act to allow States and local governments to use coronavirus relief funds provided under the American Rescue Plan Act for infrastructure projects, improve the Local Assistance and Tribal Consistency Fund, provide Tribal governments with more time to use Coronavirus Relief Fund payments, and for other purposes. |
| S. 3103 | October 28, 2021 | Eliminating Limits to Justice for Child Sex Abuse Victims Act of 2022 | A bill to amend title 18, United States Code, to eliminate the statute of limitations for the filing of a civil claim for any person who, while a minor, was a victim of a violation of section 1589, 1590, 1591, 2241(c), 2242, 2243, 2251, 2251A, 2252, 2252A, 2260, 2421, 2422, or 2423 of such title. |
| S. 3294 | December 1, 2021 | (No short title) | A bill to obtain and direct the placement in the Capitol or on the Capitol Grounds of a statue to honor Associate Justice of the Supreme Court of the United States Sandra Day O'Connor and a statue to honor Associate Justice of the Supreme Court of the United States Ruth Bader Ginsburg. |
| S. 3437 | December 18, 2021 | COVID-19 Bankruptcy Relief Extension Consolidation Act of 2021 | A bill to extend certain COVID-19 bankruptcy relief provisions through March 27, 2022. |
| S. 3451 | January 10, 2022 | (No short title) | A bill to include certain computer-related projects in the Federal permitting program under title XLI of the FAST Act, and for other purposes. |
| S. 3600 | February 8, 2022 | Strengthening American Cybersecurity Act of 2022 | A bill to improve the cybersecurity of the Federal Government, and for other purposes. |

=== Passed by the Senate, no House consent needed ===
| S. number | Date of introduction | Description |
|---|---|---|
| S.Res. 1 | January 3, 2021 | A resolution establishing a Committee to Inform the President of the United States that a quorum of each House is assembled. |
| S.Res. 2 | January 3, 2021 | A resolution informing the House of Representatives that a quorum of the Senate is assembled. |
| S.Res. 3 | January 3, 2021 | A resolution fixing the hour of daily meeting of the Senate. |
| S.Res. 4 | January 3, 2021 | A resolution fixing the hour of daily meeting of the Senate. |
| S.Res. 5 | January 19, 2021 | A resolution honoring the memory of Officer Brian David Sicknick of the United States Capitol Police for his selfless acts of heroism on the grounds of the United States Capitol on January 6, 2021. |
| S.Res. 6 | January 20, 2021 | A resolution to elect Patrick J. Leahy, a Senator from the State of Vermont, to be President pro tempore of the Senate of the United States. |
| S.Res. 7 | January 20, 2021 | A resolution expressing the thanks of the Senate to the Honorable Chuck Grassley for his service as President Pro Tempore of the United States Senate and to designate Senator Grassley as President Pro Tempore Emeritus of the United States Senate. |
| S.Res. 8 | January 20, 2021 | A resolution notifying the President of the United States of the election of a President pro tempore. |
| S.Res. 9 | January 20, 2021 | A resolution notifying the House of Representatives of the election of a President pro tempore. |
| S.Res. 10 | January 20, 2021 | A resolution electing Gary B. Myrick, of Virginia, as Secretary for the Majority of the Senate. |
| S.Res. 11 | January 20, 2021 | A resolution electing Robert M. Duncan, of the District of Columbia, as Secretary for the Minority of the Senate. |
| S.Res. 15 | January 25, 2021 | A resolution authorizing the taking of a photograph in the Chamber of the United States Senate. |
| S.Res. 16 | January 26, 2021 | A resolution to provide for related procedures concerning the article of impeachment against Donald John Trump, President of the United States. |
| S.Res. 22 | January 28, 2021 | A resolution reaffirming the partnership between the United States and the Republic of Ecuador and recognizing the restoration and advancement of economic relations, security, and development opportunities in both nations. |
| S.Res. 23 | January 28, 2021 | A resolution honoring the life and legacy of Henry Louis Aaron. |

=== Incorporated into enacted legislation ===
| S. number | Date of introduction | Short title | Description | Incorporated into |
|---|---|---|---|---|
| S.J.Res. 8 | February 23, 2021 | (No short title) | A joint resolution providing for the appointment of Barbara M. Barrett as a citizen regent of the Board of Regents of the Smithsonian Institution. | H.J.Res. 27 |
| S. 11 | January 3, 2021 | (No short title) | A bill to provide for an exception to a limitation against appointment of persons as Secretary of Defense within seven years of relief from active duty as a regular commissioned officer of the Armed Forces. | H.R. 335 |
| S. 12 | January 3, 2021 | (No short title) | A bill to provide for an exception to a limitation against appointment of persons as Secretary of Defense within seven years of relief from active duty as a regular commissioned officer of the Armed Forces. | H.R. 335 |
| S. 65 | January 27, 2021 | Uyghur Forced Labor Prevention Act | A bill to ensure that goods made with forced labor in the Xinjiang Uyghur Autonomous Region of the People's Republic of China do not enter the United States market, and for other purposes. | H.R. 6256 |
| S. 134 | January 28, 2021 | (No short title) | A bill to direct the Secretary of Veterans Affairs to carry out a retraining assistance program for unemployed veterans, and for other purposes. | H.R. 1319 |
| S. 149 | February 2, 2021 | (No short title) | A bill to amend title XI of the Social Security Act to provide Secretarial authority to temporarily waive or modify application of certain Medicare requirements with respect to ambulance services furnished during certain emergency periods. | H.R. 1319 |
| S. 473 | February 25, 2021 | COVID-19 Bankruptcy Relief Extension Act of 2021 | A bill to amend the CARES Act to extend the sunset for the definition of a small business debtor, and for other purposes. | H.R. 1799 |
| S. 682 | March 10, 2021 | SAVE LIVES Act | A bill to authorize the Secretary of Veterans Affairs to furnish a vaccine for COVID-19 to certain individuals who are not enrolled in the patient enrollment system of the Department of Veterans Affairs. | H.R. 1799 |
| S. 723 | March 11, 2021 | PPP Extension Act of 2021 | A bill to amend the Small Business Act and the CARES Act to extend the covered period for the paycheck protection program, and for other purposes. | H.R. 1799 |
| S. 3066 | October 26, 2021 | Battery Material Processing and Component Manufacturing Act of 2021 | A bill to require the Secretary of Energy to establish a battery material processing grant program and a battery manufacturing and recycling grant program, and for other purposes. | H.R. 3684 |
| S. 3067 | October 26, 2021 | NEXT in Transportation Act | A bill to amend titles 23 and 49, United States Code, to provide for new and emerging technologies in transportation, and for other purposes. | H.R. 3684 |
| S. 3121 | October 28, 2021 | Promoting American Energy Jobs Act of 2021 | A bill to require the Secretary of Energy to establish a council to conduct a survey and analysis of the employment figures and demographics in the energy, energy efficiency, and motor vehicle sectors of the United States, and for other purposes. | H.R. 3684 |
| S. 3122 | October 28, 2021 | Further Surface Transportation Extension Act of 2021 | A bill to provide an extension of Federal-aid highway, highway safety, and transit programs, and for other purposes. | H.R. 5763 |

=== Other legislation ===
Due to size constraints, this list only includes bills that have been considered by a committee.

| S. number | Date of introduction | Short title | Description |
|---|---|---|---|
| S.J.Res. 9 | February 25, 2021 | (No short title) | A joint resolution proposing an amendment to the Constitution of the United States to require that the Supreme Court of the United States be composed of nine justices. |
| S.J.Res. 10 | March 3, 2021 | (No short title) | A joint resolution to repeal the authorizations for use of military force against Iraq, and for other purposes. |
| S. 13 | January 6, 2021 | (No short title) | A bill to establish an advisory committee to make recommendations on improvements to the security, integrity, and administration of Federal elections. |
| S. 14 | January 22, 2021 | Combating Global Corruption Act of 2021 | A bill to identify and combat corruption in countries, to establish a tiered system of countries with respect to levels of corruption by their governments and their efforts to combat such corruption, and to evaluate foreign persons engaged in grand corruption for inclusion as specially designated nationals under the Global Magnitsky Human Rights Accountability Act. |
| S. 15 | January 22, 2021 | Protecting Seniors from Emergency Scams Act | A bill to require the Federal Trade Commission to submit a report to Congress on scams targeting seniors, and for other purposes. |
| S. 31 | January 22, 2021 | Protect Rural Utah's Economy Act | A bill to limit the establishment or extension of national monuments in the State of Utah. |
| S. 36 | January 25, 2021 | Kobe Bryant & Gianna Bryant Helicopter Safety Act | A bill to require certain helicopters to be equipped with safety technologies, and for other purposes. |
| S. 40 | January 25, 2021 | Commission to Study and Develop Reparation Proposals to African Americans Act | A bill to address the fundamental injustice, cruelty, brutality, and inhumanity of slavery in the United States and the 13 American colonies between 1619 and 1865 and to establish a commission to study and consider a national apology and proposal for reparations for the institution of slavery, its subsequent de jure and de facto racial and economic discrimination against African Americans, and the impact of these forces on living African Americans, to make recommendations to the Congress on appropriate remedies, and for other purposes. |
| S. 51 | January 26, 2021 | Washington, D.C. Admission Act | A bill to provide for the admission of the State of Washington, D.C. into the Union. |
| S. 66 | January 27, 2021 | South Florida Clean Coastal Waters Act of 2021 | A bill to require the Inter-Agency Task Force on Harmful Algal Blooms and Hypoxia to develop a plan for reducing, mitigating, and controlling harmful algal blooms and hypoxia in South Florida, and for other purposes. |
| S. 73 | January 27, 2021 | American Security Drone Act of 2021 | A bill to ban the Federal procurement of certain drones and other unmanned aircraft systems, and for other purposes. |
| S. 93 | January 28, 2021 | Global Magnitsky Human Rights Accountability Reauthorization Act | A bill to amend the Global Magnitsky Human Rights Accountability Act to modify the foreign persons subject to sanctions and to remove the sunset for the imposition of sanctions, and for other purposes. |
| S. 116 | January 28, 2021 | COVID-19 Home Safety Act of 2021 | A bill to require the Consumer Product Safety Commission to study the effect of the COVID-19 pandemic on injuries and deaths associated with consumer products, and for other purposes. |
| S. 140 | January 28, 2021 | BLUE GLOBE Act | A bill to improve data collection and monitoring of the Great Lakes, oceans, bays, estuaries, and coasts, and for other purposes. |
| S. 461 | February 25, 2021 | (No short title) | A bill to create a point of order against legislation modifying the number of Justices of the Supreme Court of the United States. |
| S. 818 | March 18, 2021 | (No short title) | A bill to provide for media coverage of Federal court proceedings. |

== See also ==
- List of acts of the 117th United States Congress
- Procedures of the U.S. Congress
- List of United States federal legislation
- List of executive actions by Joe Biden
- List of impeachment resolutions introduced against Donald Trump
