= List of bills in the 116th United States Congress =

116th United States Congress
←	115th	117th	→
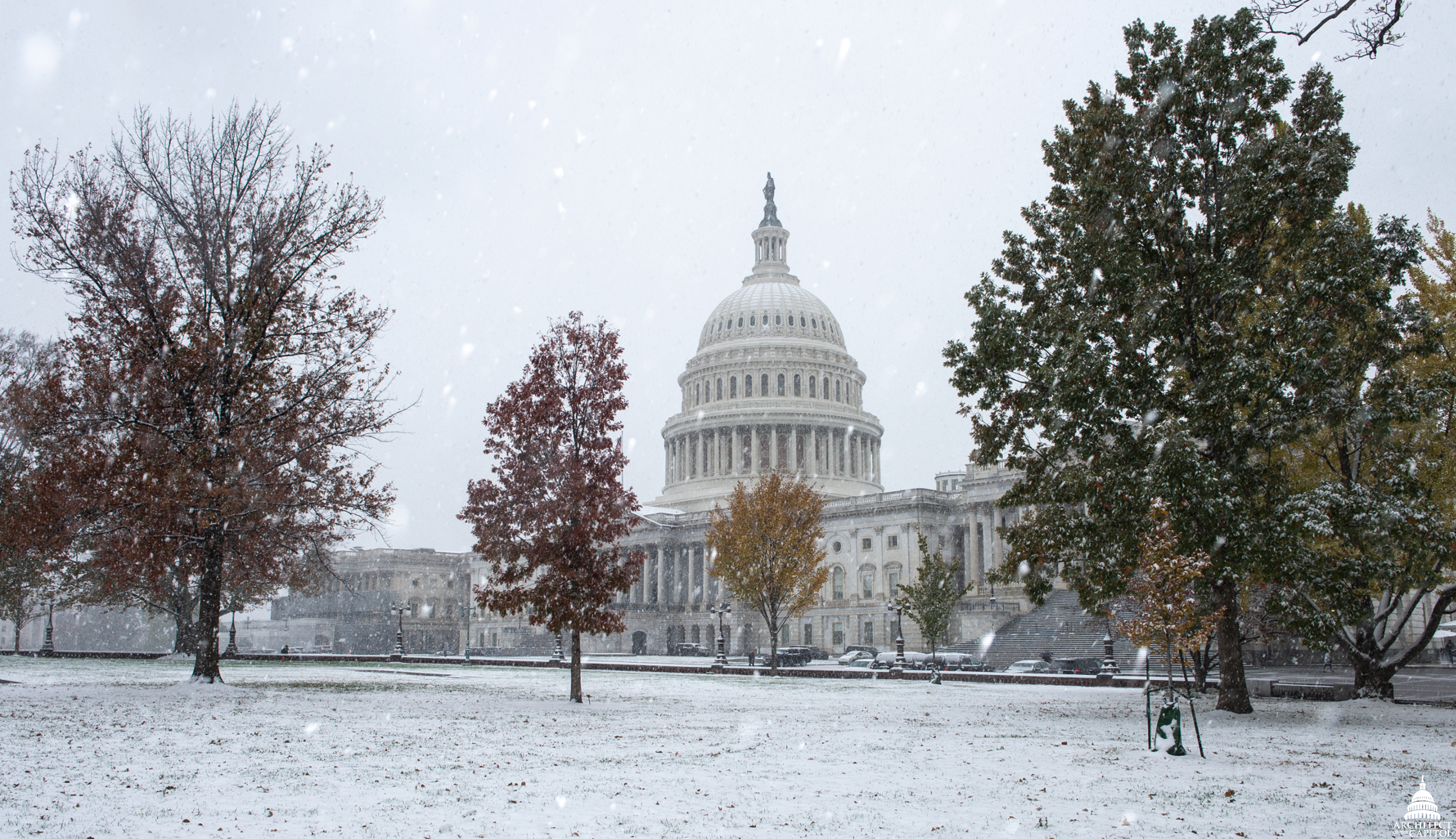
- United States Capitol (2018)

Overview
- Legislative body: United States Congress
- Jurisdiction: United States
- Term: January 3, 2019 – January 3, 2021

Senate
- Members: 100
- President: Mike Pence (R)
- President pro tempore: Chuck Grassley (R)
- Party control: Republican

House of Representatives
- Members: 435 representatives 6 non-voting delegates
- Speaker: Nancy Pelosi (D)
- Party control: Democratic

Sessions
- 1st: January 3, 2019 – January 3, 2020
- 2nd: January 3, 2020 – January 2, 2021

The bills of the 116th United States Congress list includes proposed federal laws that were introduced in the 116th United States Congress. This Congress began on January 3, 2019.

The United States Congress is the bicameral legislature of the federal government of the United States consisting of two houses: the lower house known as the House of Representatives and the upper house known as the Senate. The House and Senate are equal partners in the legislative process—legislation cannot be enacted without the consent of both chambers.

Once a bill is approved by one house, it is sent to the other which may pass, reject, or amend it. For the bill to become law, both houses must agree to identical versions of the bill. After passage by both houses, a bill is enrolled and sent to the president for signature or veto. Bills from the 116th Congress that have successfully completed this process become public laws, listed as Acts of the 116th United States Congress.

== Introduced in the House of Representatives ==
=== Passed by both houses, vetoed by Trump ===
H.R. number	Date of introduction	Short title	Description
H.J.Res. 46	January 3, 2019	Relating to a national emergency declared by the President on February 15, 2019	This joint resolution terminates the national emergency related to the U.S.-Mexico border, declared by the President on February 15, 2019. (Vetoed March 15, 2019)

=== Passed by the House, waiting in the Senate ===
H.R. number	Date of introduction	Short title	Description
H.R. 1	January 3, 2019	For the People Act of 2019	This bill addresses voter access, election integrity, election security, political spending, and ethics for the three branches of government. Specifically, the bill expands voter registration and voting access and limits removing voters from voter rolls. The bill provides for states to establish independent, nonpartisan redistricting commissions.
H.R. 2	June 11, 2020	Moving Forward Act	This bill addresses provisions related to federal-aid highway, transit, highway safety, motor carrier, research, hazardous materials, and rail programs of the Department of Transportation (DOT).
H.R. 3	September 19, 2019	Elijah E. Cummings Lower Drug Costs Now Act	This bill establishes several programs and requirements relating to the prices of prescription drugs, health care coverage and costs, and public health.
H.R. 4	February 26, 2019	John Lewis Voting Rights Act	This bill establishes new criteria for determining which states and political subdivisions must obtain preclearance before changes to voting practices in these areas may take effect. (Preclearance is the process of receiving preapproval from the Department of Justice or the U.S. District Court for the District of Columbia before making legal changes that would affect voting rights.)
H.R. 5	March 13, 2019	Equality Act	This bill prohibits discrimination based on sex, sexual orientation, and gender identity in a wide variety of areas including public accommodations and facilities, education, federal funding, employment, housing, credit, and the jury system. Specifically, the bill defines and includes sex, sexual orientation, and gender identity among the prohibited categories of discrimination or segregation.
H.R. 6	March 12, 2019	American Dream and Promise Act of 2019	This bill cancels and prohibits removal proceedings against certain aliens and provides such aliens with a path toward permanent resident status.
H.R. 7	January 20, 2019	Paycheck Fairness Act	This bill addresses wage discrimination on the basis of sex. It amends equal pay provisions of the Fair Labor Standards Act of 1938 to (1) restrict the use of the bona fide factor defense to wage discrimination claims, (2) enhance nonretaliation prohibitions, (3) make it unlawful to require an employee to sign a contract or waiver prohibiting the employee from disclosing information about the employee's wages, and (4) increase civil penalties for violations of equal pay provisions.
H.R. 8	January 8, 2019	Bipartisan Background Checks Act of 2019	This bill establishes new background check requirements for firearm transfers between private parties (i.e., unlicensed individuals). Specifically, it prohibits a firearm transfer between private parties unless a licensed gun dealer, manufacturer, or importer first takes possession of the firearm to conduct a background check. The prohibition does not apply to certain firearm transfers, such as a gift between spouses in good faith.
H.R. 9	March 27, 2019	Climate Action Now Act	This bill requires the President to develop and update annually a plan for the United States to meet its nationally determined contribution under the Paris Agreement on climate change.
H.R. 51	January 3, 2019	Washington, D.C. Admission Act	This bill admits certain portions of Washington, DC as the 51st state. The bill defines state as the State of Washington, Douglass Commonwealth.
H.J.Res. 79	November 8, 2019	Removing the deadline for the ratification of the equal rights amendment	This joint resolution eliminates the deadline for the ratification of the Equal Rights Amendment, which prohibits discrimination based on sex. The amendment was proposed to the states in House Joint Resolution 208 of the 92nd Congress, as agreed to in the Senate on March 22, 1972. The amendment shall be part of the Constitution whenever ratified by the legislatures of three-fourths of the states.
H.R. 987	February 6, 2019	Strengthening Health Care and Lowering Prescription Drug Costs Act	This bill addresses prescription drugs and the health insurance market, including (1) revising processes related to federal approval of generic drugs; (2) providing funding for states to establish health insurances exchanges; (3) nullifying an agency rule related to short-term, limited duration coverage; and (4) expanding outreach activities.
H.R. 1585	March 7, 2019	Violence Against Women Reauthorization Act of 2019	This bill modifies and reauthorizes through FY2024 programs and activities under the Violence Against Women Act that seek to prevent and respond to domestic violence, sexual assault, dating violence, and stalking. Among other things, the bill also authorizes new programs, makes changes to federal firearms laws, and establishes new protections to promote housing stability and economic security for victims of domestic violence, sexual assault, dating violence, and stalking.
H.R. 1595	March 7, 2019	Secure And Fair Enforcement Banking Act of 2019	This bill generally prohibits a federal banking regulator from penalizing a depository institution for providing banking services to a legitimate marijuana- or hemp-related business. Specifically, the bill prohibits a federal banking regulator from (1) terminating or limiting the deposit insurance or share insurance of a depository institution solely because the institution provides financial services to a legitimate marijuana- or hemp-related business; (2) prohibiting or otherwise discouraging a depository institution from offering financial services to such a business; (3) recommending, incentivizing, or encouraging a depository institution not to offer financial services to an account holder solely because the account holder is affiliated with such a business; (4) taking any adverse or corrective supervisory action on a loan made to a person solely because the person either owns such a business or owns real estate or equipment leased or sold to such a business; or (5) penalizing a depository institution for engaging in a financial service for such a business.
H.R. 1644	March 8, 2019	Save the Internet Act of 2019	To restore the open internet order of the Federal Communications Commission.
H.R. 3884	July 23, 2019	Marijuana Opportunity Reinvestment and Expungement Act (MORE Act of 2020)	This bill decriminalizes marijuana. Specifically, it removes marijuana from the list of scheduled substances under the Controlled Substances Act and eliminates criminal penalties for an individual who manufactures, distributes, or possesses marijuana.
H.R. 4617	October 8, 2019	Stopping Harmful Interference in Elections for a Lasting Democracy Act	This bill establishes a duty to report election interference from foreign entities, applies existing campaign advertising requirements to online advertisements, and generally limits political spending and election interference by foreign entities.
H.R. 7120	June 8, 2020	George Floyd Justice in Policing Act of 2020	This bill addresses a wide range of policies and issues regarding policing practices and law enforcement accountability. It includes measures to increase accountability for law enforcement misconduct, to enhance transparency and data collection, and to eliminate discriminatory policing practices.

=== Other legislation ===
H.R. number	Date of introduction	Short title	Description
H.Res. 109	January 3, 2019	Recognizing the duty of the Federal Government to create a Green New Deal	
H.R. 133	January 3, 2019	Consolidated Appropriations Act, 2021 (includes COVID-19 relief)	Signed by President Trump December 27, 2020.
H.R. 150	January 3, 2019	Grant Reporting Efficiency and Agreements Transparency Act of 2019 (GREAT Act).	This bill requires the establishment and use of data standards for information reported by recipients of federal grants. The bill requires the Office of Management and Budget, jointly with the executive department that issues the most federal grant awards, to (1) establish government-wide data standards for information reported by grant recipients, (2) issue guidance directing federal agencies to apply those standards, and (3) require the publication of recipient-reported data collected from all agencies on a single public website. Each agency shall ensure its awards use the data standards for future information collection requests.
H.Res. 411	May 30, 2019	No More Presidential Wars Act	This resolution declares that if the President initiates wars without prior congressional declarations, such action shall constitute impeachable "high crimes and misdemeanors," which shall cause the House of Representatives to vote articles of impeachment. In addition, the resolution prohibits the President from making the United States a co-belligerent in an ongoing war without a congressional declaration.
H.R. 662	January 17, 2019	REACH Act	This bill addresses hazing incidents that involve students attending an institution of higher education (IHE). Hazing means an intentional, knowing, or reckless act committed by a student, or a former student, of an IHE against another student, that (1) is connected with an initiation into, an affiliation with, or the maintenance of membership in, an organization that is affiliated with the IHE; and (2) contributes to a substantial risk of physical injury, mental harm, or degradation or causes physical injury, mental harm or personal degradation. Specifically, an IHE must disclose hazing incidents that were reported to campus security authorities or local police agencies in its annual security report. In addition, each IHE must provide students with an educational program on hazing that includes information on hazing awareness, hazing prevention, and the IHE's policies on hazing.
H.Res. 899	January 30, 2019	Recognizing the contributions of AmeriCorps members and alumni to the lives of the people of the United States.	This resolution encourages (1) the people of the United States to join in a national effort to salute AmeriCorps members and alumni and to raise awareness about the importance of national and community service, and (2) all individuals to consider opportunities to serve in AmeriCorps. The resolution also acknowledges the accomplishments of AmeriCorps members, alumni, and community partners, and recognizes their important contributions to the lives of the people of the United States.
H.R. 3151	June 6, 2019	Taxpayer First Act of 2019	This bill revises provisions relating to the Internal Revenue Service (IRS), its customer service, enforcement procedures, cybersecurity and identity protection, management of information technology, and use of electronic systems. Signed by President Trump July 1, 2019.
H.R. 2107	April 4, 2019	Affordable College Textbook Act	This bill directs the Department of Education to make grants to institutions of higher education or states to support projects that expand the use of open textbooks in order to achieve savings for students while maintaining or improving instruction and student learning outcomes. An open textbook is an educational resource that either resides in the public domain or has been released under an intellectual license that permits its free use, reuse, modification, and sharing with others.
H.R. 5049	November 12, 2019	Well-Informed, Scientific, & Efficient Government Act of 2019 (WISE Government Act)	This bill prohibits an agency from entering into a contract for a journal subscription that prohibits disclosure of the cost of the subscription to another agency or the Library of Congress. Each agency library must make policies and procedures for employee access to library subscriptions easily and clearly available to the agency's employees, including regional employees, through the intranet. The General Services Administration shall submit to Congress and each agency library a report on increasing agency library access to serials.
H.R. 4901	October 29, 2019	Puerto Rico Statehood Admission Act	This bill (1) declares that Congress commits to deeming Puerto Rico to be a state of the United States if it chooses statehood; and (2) requires Puerto Rico to conduct a plebiscite, a vote of the people, on statehood in conjunction with the November 2020 election.
H.R. 5663	January 21, 2020	Safeguarding Therapeutics Act	This bill allows the government to destroy counterfeit medical devices. Signed by President Trump January 5, 2021.
H.R. 7085	June 4, 2020	Ending Qualified Immunity Act	This bill eliminates the defense of qualified immunity in civil actions for deprivation of rights. Qualified immunity is a judicially created doctrine that protects government employees or those acting with state authority from being held personally liable for constitutional violations. The bill provides that under the statute allowing a civil action alleging deprivation of rights under color of law, it shall not be a defense or immunity to any such action that (1) the defendant was acting in good faith or believed that his or her conduct was lawful at the time it was committed; (2) the rights, privileges, or immunities secured by the Constitution or laws were not clearly established at the time of their deprivation; or (3) the state of the law was such that the defendant could not reasonably have been expected to know whether his or her conduct was lawful.
H.R. 7640	July 16, 2020	Local Journalism Sustainability Act	This bill allows individual and business taxpayers certain tax credits for the support of local newspapers and media. Specifically, individual taxpayers may claim an income tax credit up to $250 for a local newspaper subscription. The bill also allows local newspaper employers a payroll tax credit for wages paid to an employee for service as a journalist and certain small businesses a tax credit for local newspaper and media advertising expenses.
H.R. 8424	September 29, 2020	Supreme Court Term Limits and Regular Appointments Act of 2020	The bill requires the President to appoint a Supreme Court Justice every two years. If the appointment of a Justice would result in more than nine Justices on the Court, then the longest serving Justice, excluding Justices appointed before the enactment of the bill, is deemed retired from regular service and designated as a Senior Justice. Further, any Justice who has served a total of 18 years is deemed retired from regular service and may continue to serve as a Senior Justice. Senior Justices may continue to perform judicial duties assigned to them by the Chief Justice. However, a Justice who retires from regular service due to a disability may not serve as a Senior Justice. In the event of a vacancy on the Court, the Chief Justice must assign the Justice most recently designated as a Senior Justice to serve on the Court until the appointment of a new Justice. Additionally, the Senate's advice and consent authority is waived if the Senate does not act within 120 days of a Justice's nomination.

== Introduced in the Senate ==
=== Passed both houses, vetoed by Trump ===
H.R. number	Date of introduction	Short title	Description
S.J.Res. 7	January 30, 2019	A joint resolution to direct the removal of United States Armed Forces from hostilities in the Republic of Yemen that have not been authorized by Congress.	This joint resolution directs the President to remove U.S. Armed Forces from hostilities in or affecting Yemen within 30 days unless Congress authorizes a later withdrawal date, issues a declaration of war, or specifically authorizes the use of the Armed Forces. Prohibited activities include providing in-flight fueling for non-U.S. aircraft conducting missions as part of the conflict in Yemen. This joint resolution shall not affect any military operations directed at Al Qaeda. The President must submit to Congress, within 90 days, reports assessing the risks that would be posed (1) if the United States were to cease supporting operations with respect to the conflict in Yemen, and (2) if Saudi Arabia were to cease sharing Yemen-related intelligence with the United States. Vetoed April 16, 2019

=== Other legislation ===
H.R. number	Date of introduction	Short title	Description
S. 1	January 3, 2019	Combating BDS Act	Nonpreemption of measures by State and local governments to divest from entities that engage in certain boycott, divestment, or sanctions activities targeting Israel or persons doing business in Israel or Israeli-controlled territories.
S. 488	January 3, 2019	Justice for Victims of Lynching Act	This bill establishes a new criminal civil rights violation for lynching. Specifically, a person who conspires to commit certain civil rights offenses (e.g., a hate crime act) is subject to criminal penalties.
S. 1036	April 4, 2019	Affordable College Textbook Act	This bill directs the Department of Education to make grants to institutions of higher education or states to support projects that expand the use of open textbooks in order to achieve savings for students while maintaining or improving instruction and student learning outcomes. An open textbook is an educational resource that either resides in the public domain or has been released under an intellectual license that permits its free use, reuse, modification, and sharing with others.
S. 1829	June 13, 2019	Grant Reporting Efficiency and Agreements Transparency Act of 2019 (GREAT Act)	This bill requires the establishment and use of data standards for information reported by recipients of federal grants. The bill requires the Office of Management and Budget, jointly with the executive department that issues the most federal grant awards, to (1) establish government-wide data standards for information reported by grant recipients, (2) issue guidance directing federal agencies to apply those standards, and (3) require the publication of recipient-reported data collected from all agencies on a single public website. Each agency shall ensure its awards use the data standards for future information collection requests.

== See also ==
- List of acts of the 116th United States Congress
- Procedures of the U.S. Congress
- List of United States federal legislation
