= ACCESS Act of 2021 =

- Long title: To promote competition, lower entry barriers, and reduce switching costs for consumers and businesses online.
- Announced in: the 117th United States Congress
- Number of co-sponsors: 28

Legislative history
- Introduced in the House of Representatives as H.R. 3849 by Mary Gay Scanlon (D–PA) on June 11, 2021; Committee consideration by United States House Committee on the Judiciary

The Augmenting Compatibility and Competition by Enabling Service Switching Act of 2021, or the ACCESS Act of 2021, is a proposed antitrust bill in the United States House of Representatives. The purpose of the legislation is to mandate data portability from Big Tech companies to provide users the ability to switch their data between platforms.

The legislation was introduced on June 11, 2021, by Mary Gay Scanlon (D-PA) with support from Democrats David Cicilline (D-RI) and Jerry Nadler (D-NY) and Republicans Ken Buck (R-CO) and Burgess Owens (R-UT).

== History ==
In the 116th Congress session, a similar bill with the same name was introduced in the Senate by Mark Warner (D-VA) and Josh Hawley (R-MO). On May 25, 2022, Warner and Hawley introduced companion legislation in the Senate for the 117th United States Congress.

== Provisions ==
Proponents of the legislation argue that platforms that prohibit user data from being portable to another platform are engaging in anti-competitive behavior against competitors. The legislation defines user data as any information a covered platform collects unique to an individual or their device. Covered platforms subject to these regulations are those with over 100 million monthly active users.

The legislation creates a Technical Committee within the Federal Trade Commission (FTC) that will be tasked with developing standards for interoperability and online data portability. The legislation grants the FTC enforcement authority to penalize platforms that violate the legislation.

== Voting summary ==
On June 23, 2021, the House Committee on the Judiciary voted to advance the legislation to the House floor in a 29–19 vote.

== Legislative History ==
Congress	Short title	Bill number(s)	Date introduced	Sponsor(s)	# of cosponsors	Latest status
116th Congress	ACCESS Act of 2019	S.2658	October 22, 2019	Mark Warner(D-VA)	2	Died in Committee.
117th Congress	ACCESS Act of 2021	H.R.3849	June 11, 2021	Mary Gay Scanlon(D-PA)	28	Approved by Committee, sent to house floor
117th Congress	ACCESS Act of 2022	S.4309	May 25, 2022	Mark Warner(D-VA)	4	Referred to committees of jurisdiction.

== See also ==
- American Innovation and Choice Online Act
- General Data Protection Regulation
- Merger Filing Fee Modernization Act of 2021
- Open App Markets Act
- State Antitrust Enforcement Venue Act of 2021
