= Merger Filing Fee Modernization Act of 2021 =

Proposed bill in the United States Congress

- Long title: A bill to promote antitrust enforcement and protect competition through adjusting premerger filing fees, and increasing antitrust enforcement resources.
- Announced in: the 117th United States Congress
- Number of co-sponsors: 2 (Senate)

Legislative history
- Introduced in the Senate as S. 228 by Amy Klobuchar (D–MN) on February 4, 2021; Committee consideration by United States Senate Committee on the Judiciary

The Merger Filing Fee Modernization Act of 2021 (MFFMA) is a proposed antitrust bill in the United States Congress. The legislation was introduced in the Senate by Amy Klobuchar (D-MN) and Chuck Grassley (R-IA) as S. 228 on February 4, 2021. Companion legislation was introduced in the House of Representatives by Joe Neguse (D-CO) and Victoria Spartz (R-IN) as H.R. 3843 on June 11, 2021.

The legislation increases filing fees for the largest mergers and acquisitions. In doing so, the legislation intends to increase the amount of available resources for the Federal Trade Commission (FTC) and Department of Justice's (DOJ) antitrust probes. The original Senate and House versions of the bill have passed the Senate Judiciary Committee and House Judiciary Committee, respectively.

On September 29, 2022, the House voted to pass a legislative package led by the MFFMA in a 242—184 vote. The package also includes the State Antitrust Enforcement Venue Act and the Foreign Merger Subsidy Disclosure Act. A version of the legislation was included in the Consolidated Appropriations Act, 2023.

== History ==
The legislation proposes the first increase to pre-merger filing fees in the United States since 2001. Members of the FTC have argued that currently filing fees and agency funding have not kept pace with inflation and increase in merger activity.

== Provisions ==
Under the provisions of the original MFFMA, merger fees for:

- Deals between $500 million and $1 billion, which currently range from $125,000 and $280,000, would be changed to $250,000
- Deals between $1 billion and $2 billion would be raised from $280,000 to $400,000
- Deals worth over $5 billion would see an increase from $280,000 to $2.25 million

At the same time, the legislation reduces filing fees for mergers under $500 million from $125,000 to $100,000.

== Voting history ==
On May 13, 2021, the Senate Judiciary Committee voted to advance the legislation to a full vote in the Senate by voice vote. On June 23, the House Judiciary Committee in favor of advancing H.R. 3843 to the House floor by a 29—12 margin.

== See also ==
- American Innovation and Choice Online Act
- Hart–Scott–Rodino Antitrust Improvements Act
- Open App Markets Act
- State Antitrust Enforcement Venue Act of 2021
- United States antitrust law
