= 2023 Speaker of the United States House of Representatives election =

2023 Speaker of the United States House of Representatives election may refer to:

- January 2023 Speaker of the United States House of Representatives election
- October 2023 Speaker of the United States House of Representatives election
