= 2023 United States federal budget =

US budget from 1 October 2022 to 30 September 2023

2023 Budget of the United States federal government
- Country: United States
- Total revenue: $4.439 trillion (actual) 16.5% of GDP
- Total expenditures: $6.134 trillion (actual) 22.8% of GDP
- Deficit: $1.695 trillion (actual); 6.3% of GDP

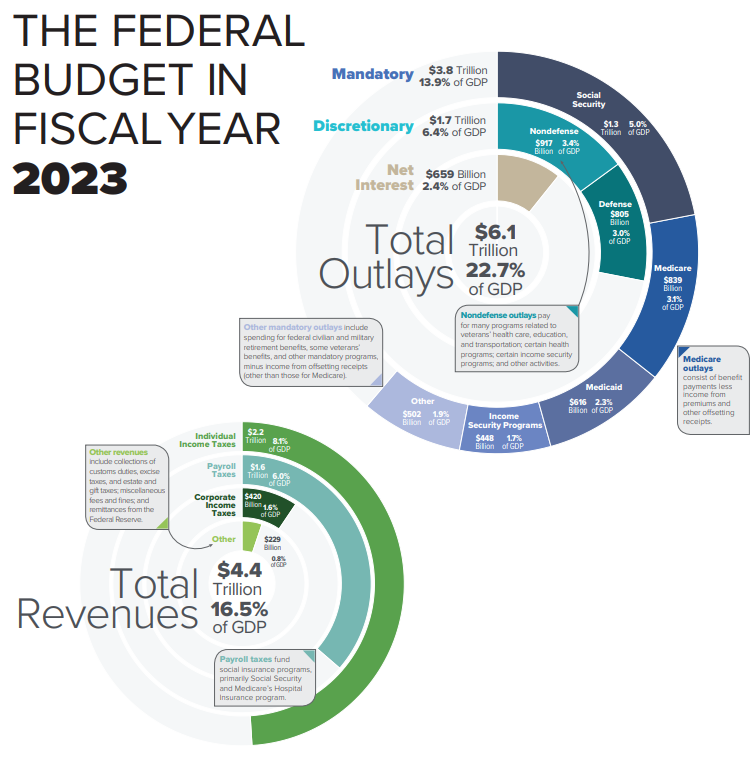
Federal Revenue and Spending

Consolidated Appropriations Act, 2023
- Long title: An act making consolidated appropriations for the fiscal year ending September 30, 2023, and for providing emergency assistance for the situation in Ukraine, and for other purposes.
- Enacted by: the 117th United States Congress
- Effective: December 29, 2022

Citations
- Public law: Pub. L. 117–328 (text) (PDF)
- Statutes at Large: 136 Stat. 4459

Legislative history
- Introduced in the House as H.R. 2617 (Performance Enhancement Reform Act) by Hakeem Jeffries (D-NY) on April 13, 2021; Committee consideration by United States House Committee on Oversight and Reform; Passed the House on September 28, 2021 (414–10); Passed the Senate on November 15, 2022 (unanimous consent) with amendment; Agreed to by the Senate on December 22, 2022 (68–29 as Consolidated Appropriations Act, 2023); House agreed to Senate amendment on December 23, 2022 (225–201–1); Signed into law by President Joe Biden on December 29, 2022

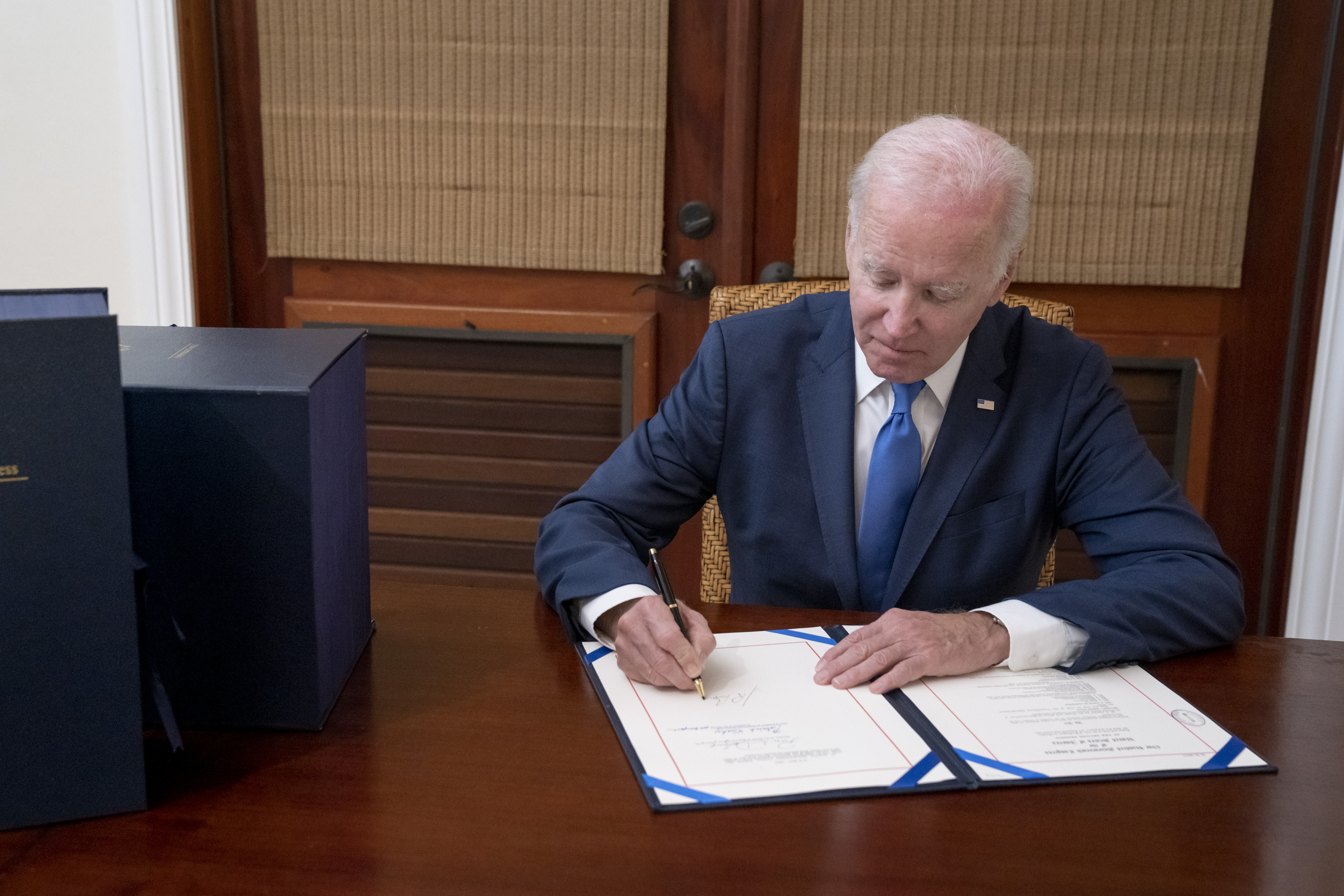
President Joe Biden signs the Consolidated Appropriations Act of 2023 in St. Croix on December 29, 2022

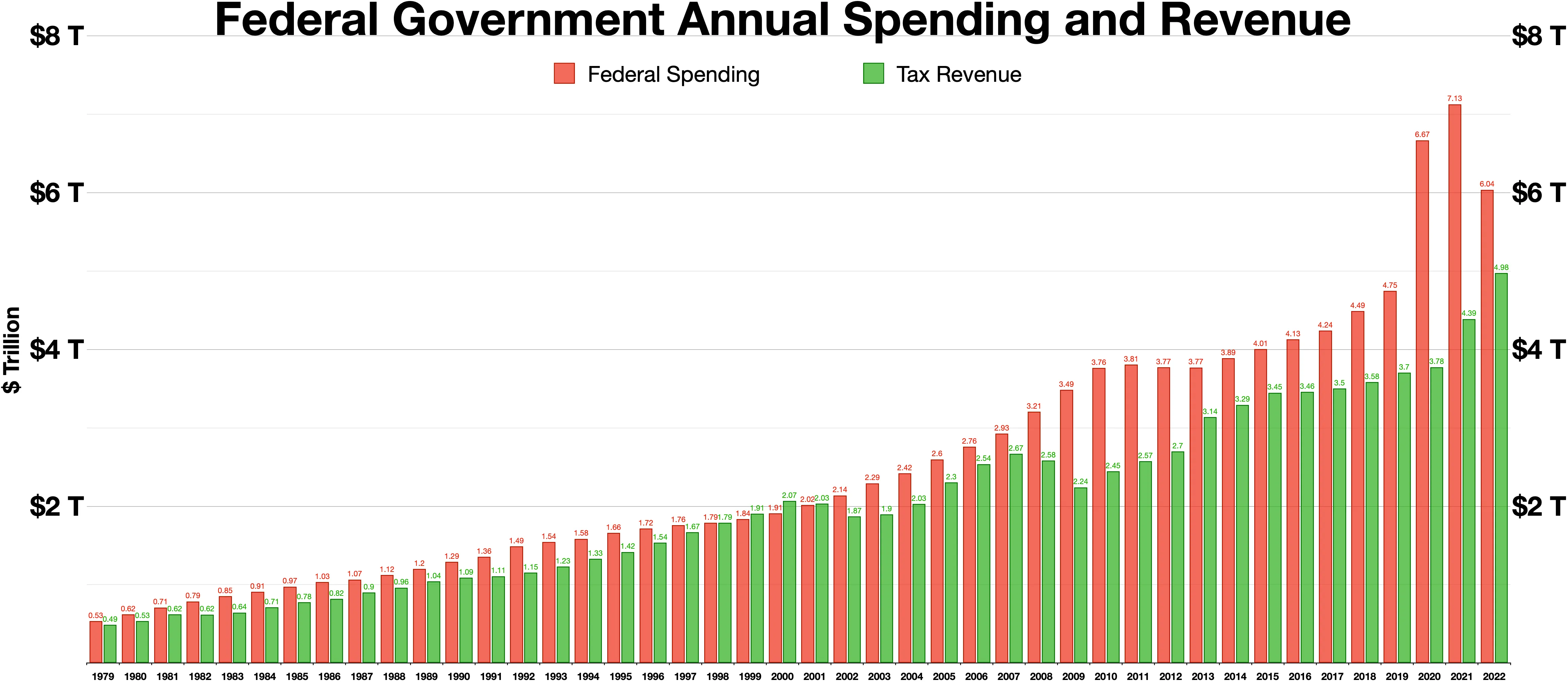
Federal Government annual spending and revenue Federal spending Tax revenue

The United States federal budget for fiscal year 2023 ran from October 1, 2022, to September 30, 2023. The government was initially funded through a series of three temporary continuing resolutions. The final funding package was passed as an omnibus spending bill, the Consolidated Appropriations Act, 2023.

== Budget proposal ==
The Biden administration budget proposal was released in March 2022.

== Appropriations legislation ==
A series of three continuing resolutions were passed to initially fund government operations:

- The Continuing Appropriations and Ukraine Supplemental Appropriations Act, 2023 (Pub. L. 117–180 (text) (PDF)) to December 16, which also included supplemental appropriations for aid to Ukraine in its war against Russia.
- The Further Continuing Appropriations and Extensions Act, 2023 (Pub. L. 117–229 (text) (PDF)) to December 23
- The Further Additional Continuing Appropriations and Extensions Act, 2023 (Pub. L. 117–264 (text) (PDF)) to December 30

All 12 appropriations bills were enacted as a part of the Consolidated Appropriations Act, 2023, a $1.7 trillion omnibus spending bill. It includes funding for a range of domestic and foreign policy priorities, including support for Ukraine, defense spending, and aid for regions affected by natural disasters. It also includes provisions related to advanced transportation research, health care, electoral reform, and restrictions on the use of the social media app TikTok.

Congress passed the Act on December 23, 2022, and President Joe Biden signed it into law on December 29.

=== Provisions ===
In addition to the 12 annual regular appropriations bills (divisions A through L), the Consolidated Appropriations Act has several other provisions, including:

- Division M: the Additional Ukraine Supplemental Appropriations Act, 2023, including:
  - a section similar to the proposed Asset Seizure for Ukraine Reconstruction Act, a bill allowing the use of assets seized from Russian oligarchs to fund the rebuilding of Ukraine (Section 1708)
- Division N: the Disaster Relief Supplemental Appropriations Act, 2023
- Division O: extenders and technical corrections
- Division P: the Electoral Count Reform and Presidential Transition Improvement Act of 2022, comprising:
  - Title I: the Electoral Count Reform Act of 2022, the largest reform to the counting of electoral votes since 1886
  - Title II: the Presidential Transition Improvement Act
- Division Q: aviation-related matters
- Division R: the No TikTok on Government Devices Act, a bill banning the use of the video-sharing app TikTok on federal computers and portable devices
- Division S: oceans-related matters
- Division T: the SECURE 2.0 Act of 2022
- Division U: the Joseph Maxwell Cleland and Robert Joseph Dole Memorial Veterans Benefits and Health Care Improvement Act of 2022
- Division V: the STRONG Veterans Act of 2022
- Division W: the Unleashing American Innovators Act of 2022
- Division X: extension of authorization for special assessment for Domestic Trafficking Victims' Fund
- Division Y: the CONTRACT Act of 2022
- Division Z: the COVS Act
- Division AA: financial-services matters
- Division BB: consumer protection and commerce
- Division CC: water-related matters
- Division DD: public land management
- Division EE: post office designations
- Division FF: the Health Extenders, Improving Access to Medicare, Medicaid, and CHIP, and Strengthening Public Health Act of 2022, including:
  - Title II: a funding increase of $1.5 billion to ARPA-H
- Division GG: the Merger Filing Fee Modernization Act of 2022, an antitrust bill that raises acquisition filings fees for large transactions, including:
  - Title III: a title similar to the proposed State Antitrust Enforcement Venue Act, an antitrust bill preventing multiple state antitrust lawsuits from being transferred to a separate venue at a company's request
- Division HH: agriculture
- Division II: the Pregnant Workers Fairness Act, a bill to increase workplace accommodations for pregnant workers
- Division JJ: North Atlantic Right Whales
- Division KK: the PUMP for Nursing Mothers Act, a bill requiring organizations to provide time and space for breastfeeding parents
- Division LL: the State, Local, Tribal, and Territorial Fiscal Recovery, Infrastructure, and Disaster Relief Flexibility Act
- Division MM: the Fairness for 9/11 Families Act

== Votes ==
=== House votes ===
Continuing Appropriations and Ukraine Supplemental Appropriations Act, 2023
Party	Yes	No	Voted "Present"	Not voting
Republican	10: Brian Fitzpatrick; Anthony Gonzalez; Garret Graves; Chris Jacobs; John Katko; Adam Kinzinger; Patrick McHenry; Hal Rogers; Fred Upton; Steve Womack	201	—N/a	1
Democratic	220	0	—N/a	1
Total votes	230	201	—N/a	2

Further Continuing Appropriations and Extensions Act, 2023
Party	Yes	No	Voted "Present"	Not voting
Republican	9: Liz Cheney; Brian Fitzpatrick; Anthony Gonzalez; Jaime Herrera Beutler; Chris Jacobs; John Katko; Adam Kinzinger; Fred Upton; Steve Womack	201	—N/a	3
Democratic	215	0	—N/a	2
Total votes	224	201	—N/a	3

Consolidated Appropriations Act, 2023
Party	Yes	No	Voted "Present"	Not voting
Republican	9: Liz Cheney; Rodney Davis; Brian Fitzpatrick; Jaime Herrera Beutler; Chris Jacobs; John Katko; Adam Kinzinger; Fred Upton; Steve Womack	200	—N/a	4
Democratic	216	1: Alexandria Ocasio-Cortez	1: Rashida Tlaib	0
Total votes	225	201	1	4

=== Senate votes ===
Continuing Appropriations and Ukraine Supplemental Appropriations Act, 2023
Party	Yes	No	Voted "Present"	Not voting
Republican	22	25	—N/a	3
Democratic	48	0	—N/a	—N/a
Independent	2	0	—N/a	—N/a
Total votes	72	25	—N/a	3

Further Continuing Appropriations and Extensions Act, 2023
Party	Yes	No	Voted "Present"	Not voting
Republican	22	19	—N/a	9
Democratic	47	0	—N/a	1
Independent	2	0	—N/a	—N/a
Total votes	71	19	—N/a	10

Consolidated Appropriations Act, 2023
Party	Yes	No	Voted "Present"	Not voting
Republican	18	29	—N/a	3
Democratic	48	0	—N/a	—N/a
Independent	2	0	—N/a	—N/a
Total votes	68	29	—N/a	3
