= October 2023 Speaker of the United States House of Representatives election =

- October 17–25, 2023

Needed to win: Majority of votes cast First ballot: 432 votes cast, 217 needed for a majority Fourth ballot: 429 votes cast, 215 needed for a majority
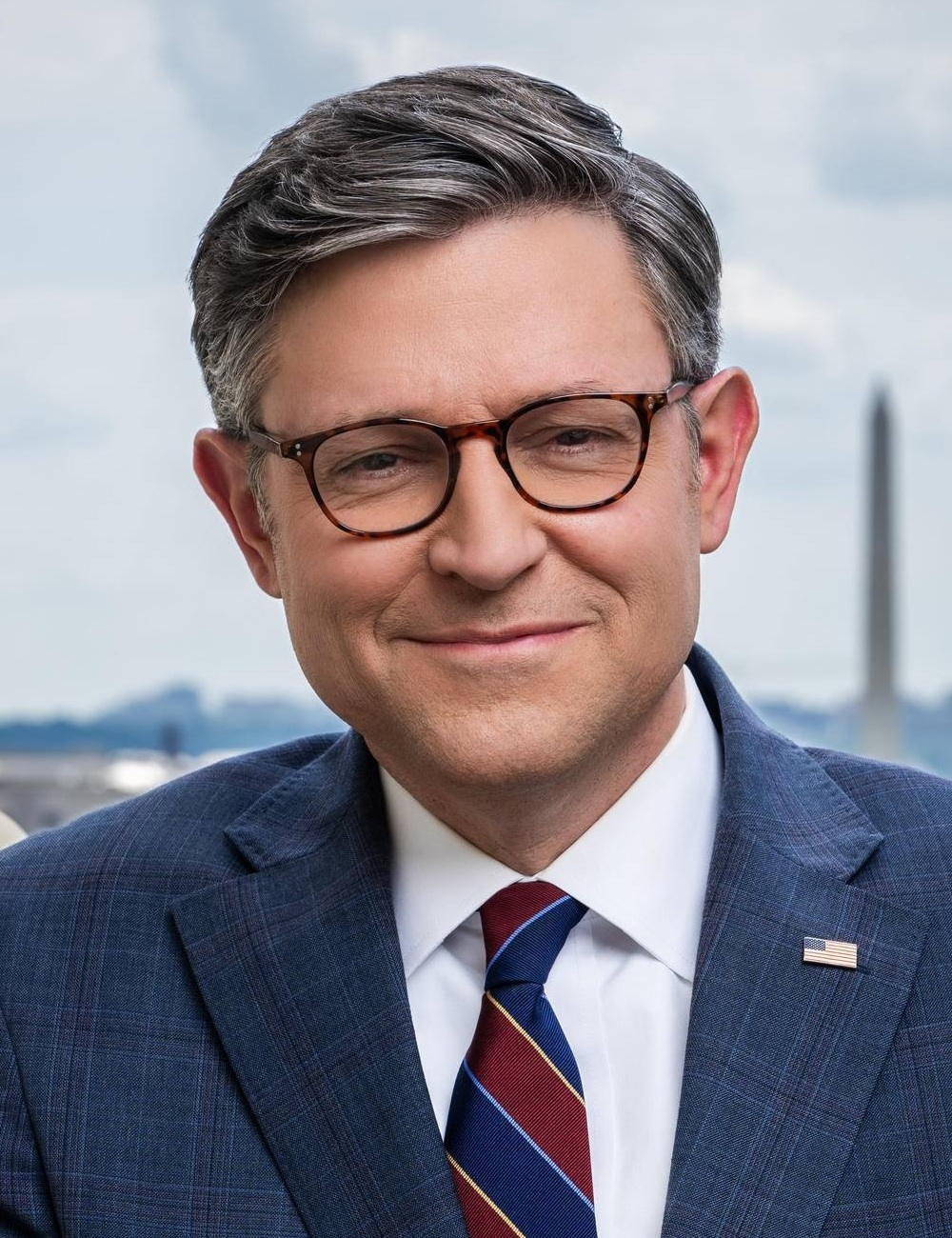

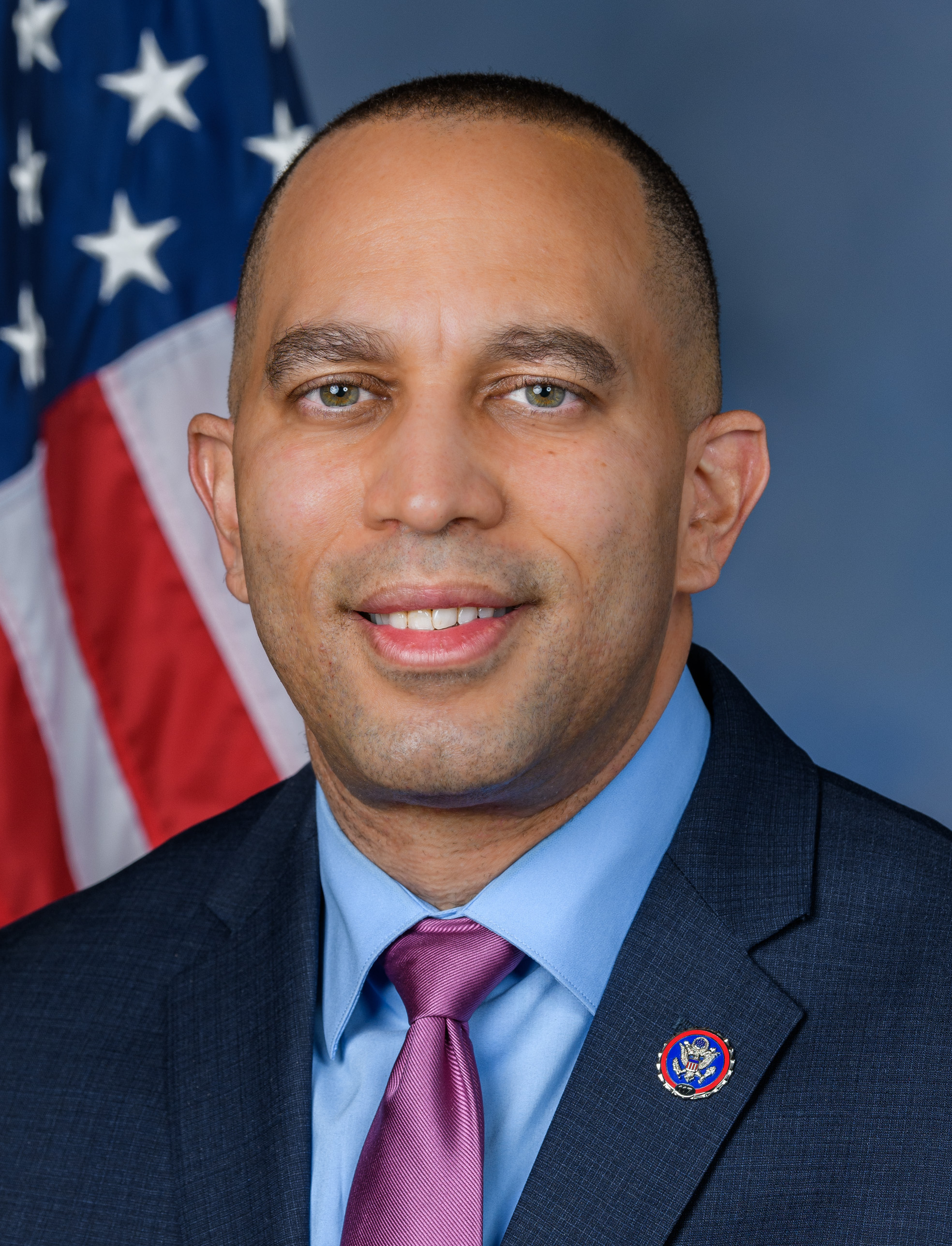

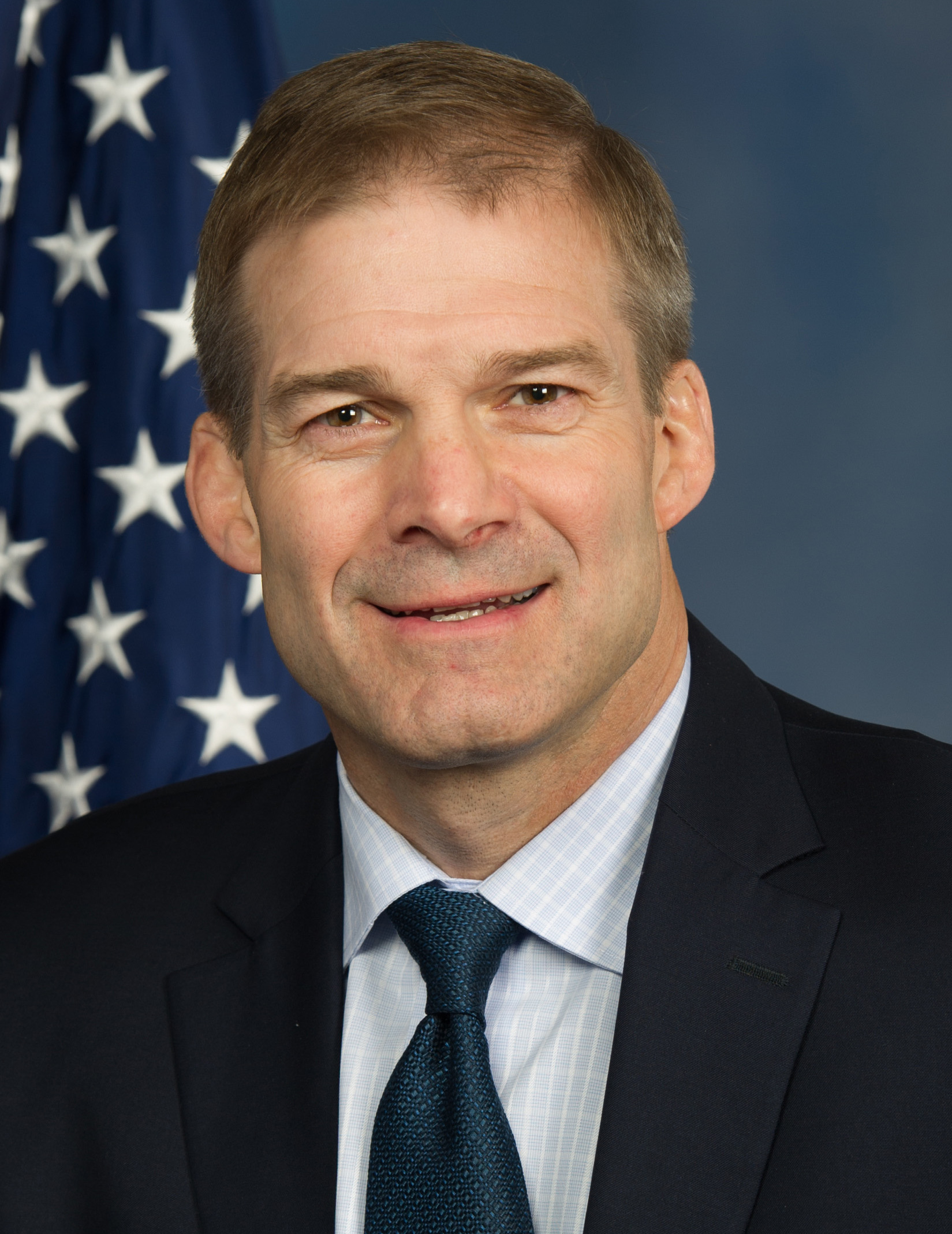

	Majority party	Minority party
Candidate	Mike Johnson (Note: Elected as Republican conference nominee after the third ballot.)	Hakeem Jeffries
Party	Republican	Democratic
Leader's seat	Louisiana 4th	New York 8th
First ballot	Did not contest	212 (49.1%)
Final ballot	220 (51.3%)	209 (48.7%)
	Third party
Candidate	Jim Jordan (Note: Removed as nominee after third ballot.)	Others
Party	Republican
Leader's seat	Ohio 4th
First ballot	200 (46.3%)	20 (4.6%)
Final ballot	Withdrawn	—
Speaker before election
Vacant (Note: Patrick McHenry (Republican) as speaker pro tempore.)
Elected Speaker
Mike Johnson
Republican

On October 17, 2023, following the October 3 removal of Republican Kevin McCarthy as speaker of the House, members of the U.S. House of Representatives began the process of holding an intra-term election for speaker of the House. The election concluded on October 25, 2023 when Republican Mike Johnson of Louisiana was elected the 56th speaker of the House on the fourth ballot.

In the 118th Congress, the House Republican Conference held the majority of seats. McCarthy had been elected speaker on January 7, 2023, after an unusual fifteen rounds of voting in the January speakership election. On October 3, a motion to vacate McCarthy's speakership passed by a vote of 216–210, with eight Republican representatives voting along with all Democrats to remove McCarthy. This was the first time in congressional history the House voted to remove an incumbent speaker during an active congressional legislative session.

Patrick McHenry of North Carolina, also a Republican, served as speaker pro tempore until a new speaker was elected. Hakeem Jeffries of New York was unanimously nominated for speaker by the House Democratic Caucus on October 10. Majority Leader Steve Scalise of Louisiana was nominated by the House Republican Conference on October 11, but he withdrew from the race the next day. Jim Jordan of Ohio was nominated on a second internal Republican conference vote on October 13. On October 20, after Jordan failed to be elected speaker in three separate votes, the House Republican Conference voted to remove him as the Republican Party's nominee for speaker. On October 24, the conference nominated Majority Whip Tom Emmer for speaker. Emmer withdrew his candidacy shortly after Republican former president Donald Trump voiced his opposition to it.

Later on October 24, Louisiana representative and conference vice chair Mike Johnson was selected as the next nominee for the speakership. On October 25, Johnson was elected speaker, defeating Jeffries in a 220–209 vote. Unlike previous ballots, no Republicans defected, and every representative present voted for their party's nominee for Speaker.

== Background ==
On October 2, Matt Gaetz of Florida filed a motion to vacate, forcing a vote on McCarthy's removal within two legislative days. Gaetz filed the motion after McCarthy relied on Democrats to help pass a bipartisan continuing resolution to fund the government through November 17, averting a government shutdown. Voting began the following day; McCarthy ruled out a deal involving support from Democrats in exchange for concessions. Following an unsuccessful vote to table (kill) the motion, the motion passed by a vote of 216–210, with Republican representatives Andy Biggs, Ken Buck, Tim Burchett, Eli Crane, Matt Gaetz, Bob Good, Nancy Mace, and Matt Rosendale voting along with all Democrats to remove McCarthy. This was the first time in congressional history the House voted to remove an incumbent speaker during an active congressional legislative session.

In accordance with procedures that had been established in the wake of the terrorist attacks on September 11, 2001, McCarthy at the start of his term created a secret ordered list of members to temporarily act as speaker of the House if the speakership becomes vacant. Patrick McHenry of North Carolina was at the top of McCarthy's list and became the speaker pro tempore following McCarthy's removal. Immediately after becoming acting speaker, McHenry called the House into recess in order to allow time before a speakership floor vote for the party caucuses to each meet in order "to discuss the path forward".

=== Process and nominations ===
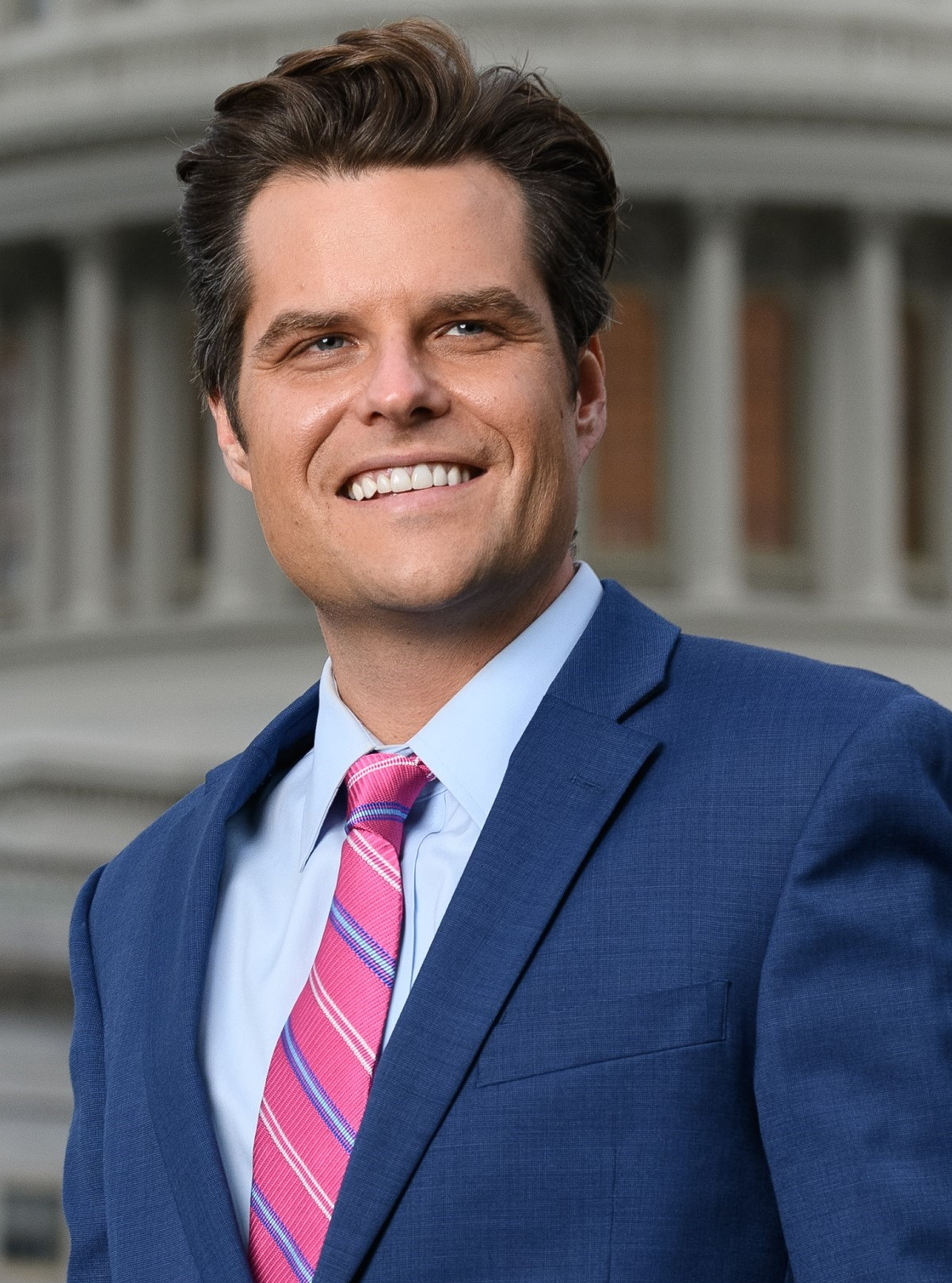
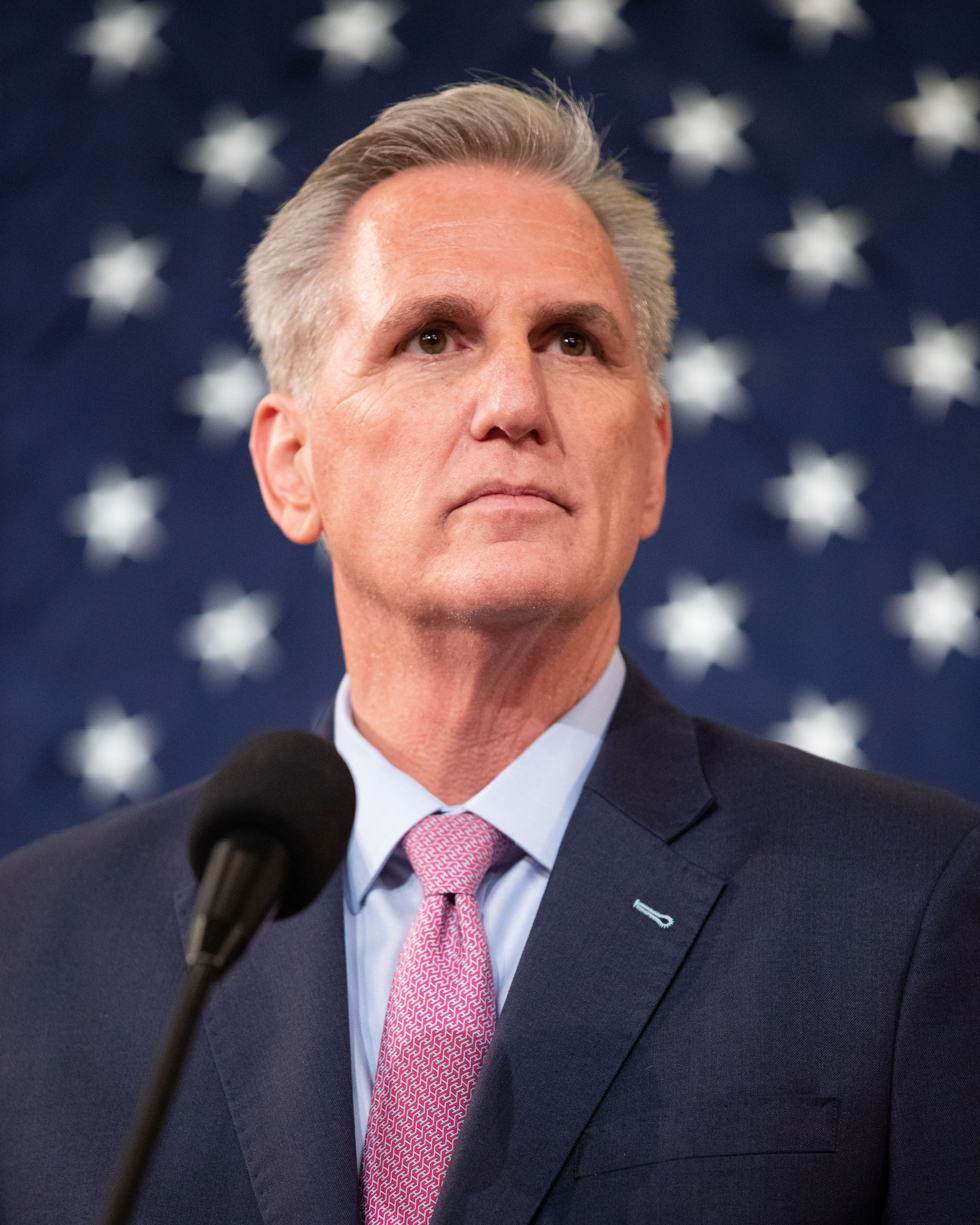
Matt Gaetz of Florida (left) successfully moved to vacate the speakership of Kevin McCarthy of California (right)

The speaker of the House of Representatives is the House's presiding officer, and the position is explicitly established by the Constitution of the United States. The House elects its speaker at the beginning of a new Congress (i.e. biennially after a general election) or when a speaker dies, resigns, or is removed from the position by a vote held during an active term.

The selection of a speaker has the highest priority in the operation of the House, and is described in Rule #1 of the 118th United States Congress Rules of the U.S. House of Representatives. In past cases when the speakership has been vacant, the House has not conducted any other business until completing the election of a new speaker. Differing opinions have been expressed about whether this is the only action that is allowed to be taken during such a period, and particularly regarding whether the House could pass legislation during such a period or not, but it has never been attempted.

Following the vote to remove McCarthy, House Republicans and Democrats held separate caucus meetings to determine who their respective party caucuses (the House Republican Conference and House Democratic Caucus) would support for the speakership. In such votes, both caucuses require a simple majority of caucus members in order for a candidate to receive the nomination of the caucus.

Since 1839, the House has elected speakers by roll call vote. Traditionally, each party's caucus selects a candidate for the speakership from among its senior leaders prior to the roll call. Representatives are not restricted to voting for the candidate nominated by their party, but generally do, as the outcome of the election effectively determines which party has the majority and consequently is expected to organize the House. Representatives that choose to vote for someone other than their party's nominated candidate usually vote for someone else in their party or vote "present".

The Constitution does not explicitly require the Speaker to be an incumbent member of the House and non-members have received votes in multiple Speaker elections since 1997. Nevertheless, every speaker has been a member and the constitutionality of the eligibility of non-members to serve as Speaker is disputed.

To be elected speaker, a candidate must receive an absolute majority of the votes cast, as contrasted with an absolute majority of the full membership of the House – presently 218 votes, in a House of 435. There have only been a few instances during the past century where a person received a majority of the votes cast, and thus won the election, while failing to obtain a majority of the full membership. One of these instances was in the previous speakership election, in January 2023 opening the 118th Congress), when Kevin McCarthy was elected with 216 votes, less than 218 due to "present" votes, which indicate abstention. Such a variation in the number of votes necessary to win a given election might arise due to vacancies, absentees, or members being present but not voting. Upon winning election, the new speaker is immediately sworn in by the dean of the United States House of Representatives, the chamber's longest-serving member. If no candidate wins a majority of the "votes cast for a person by name", then the roll call is repeated until a speaker is elected.

== Initial nominations ==
=== Democratic nomination ===
On October 10, 2023, the House Democratic Caucus voted unanimously for Hakeem Jeffries of New York (the incumbent House Minority Leader) to be its nominee. Jeffries had been the Democratic Caucus's nominee in the January 2023 speakership election, in which all present Democratic members unanimously voted for him across all fifteen rounds of balloting.

=== Republican nomination ===
==== Lead-up to first conference vote ====
After the speakership was vacated on October 3, a number of different candidates for the Republican nomination indicated interest including Jim Jordan of Ohio, Steve Scalise of Louisiana, Kevin Hern of Oklahoma, and former president Donald Trump. On October 4, Jordan and Scalise announced their candidacies. That same day, Troy Nehls of Texas announced that he would nominate Trump for speaker. Trump publicly considered running for the position, even weighing a visit to the Capitol to gather support for his bid. On the evening of October 5, Trump announced in a post on Truth Social that he would not run for speaker and instead would endorse Jim Jordan.

On Friday, October 6, it was reported that a televised debate was planned to be hosted by Bret Baier of Fox News between Scalise, Jordan and Kevin Hern of Oklahoma on the following Monday. However, several Republican representatives criticized the planned debate as a "circus". In response, Scalise, Jordan and Hern each announced they would not participate, and the event was cancelled.

==== Scalise nomination ====
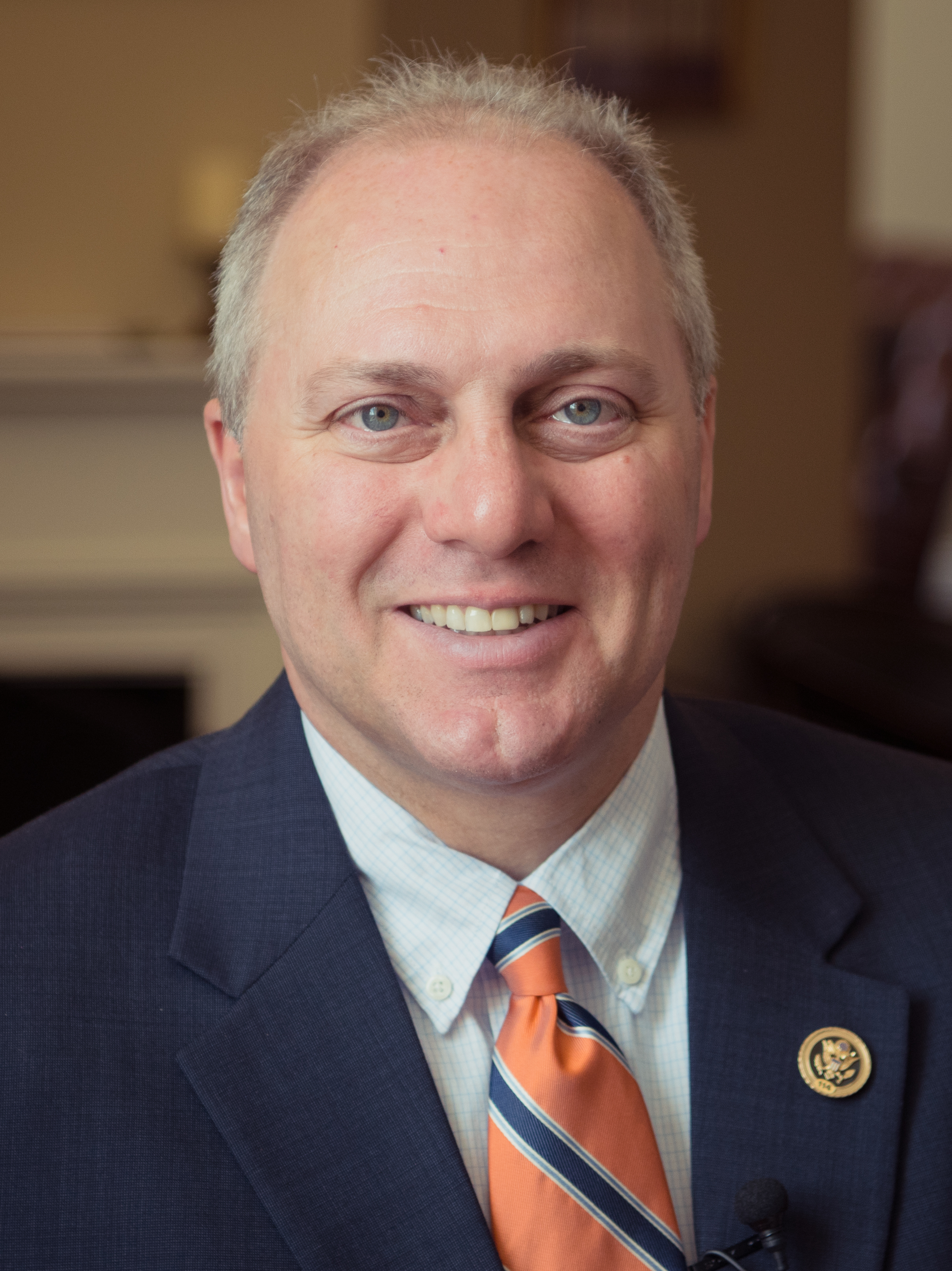
Steve Scalise of Louisiana was nominated by the Republican Party on October 11, but withdrew a day later.

The first House Republican Conference vote was held on October 11, 2023. Prior to the vote, House Republicans tabled (killed) a motion from Representative Chip Roy that would have required the Republican nominee to receive 217 votes, instead of a simple majority, to become the nominee. Despite a challenge from Jordan, Scalise won the majority of votes, becoming the Republican nominee for speaker of the House. Only 212 out of 224 (Note: The three Republican territorial delegates were allowed to vote in the conference.) conference members cast a vote for either Scalise or Jordan. In an interview released shortly after the vote, Ken Buck claimed that he had voted present, as he was not satisfied with either candidate. Representative Cory Mills missed the vote because he was in Israel helping to evacuate Americans impacted by the Gaza war. Many lawmakers declined to run, notably Kevin McCarthy, Matt Gaetz, and former president Donald Trump.

Candidate	Votes	Percent
Steve Scalise ✓	113	51.4%
Jim Jordan	99	45.0%
Other candidates	8	3.6%
Present	3	—N/a
Did not vote	1	—N/a

Minutes after the meeting concluded, representatives Lauren Boebert, Bob Good, Nancy Mace, Max Miller, Barry Moore, and Lloyd Smucker said that they would continue to vote for Jordan on the House floor. Representative Carlos Gimenez said he would vote for Kevin McCarthy on the floor unless McCarthy told him otherwise. These defections were unexpected since abiding by the results of an internal nominee selection was "historically a given". It was expected that Democrats would unanimously vote for Jeffries when the House convened for a roll call, with there being no expectation that any Democrats would either vote for Scalise or abstain from the vote in order to intentionally lower the number of Republican members' votes Scalise would need in order to become speaker. As a result, these Republican defections meant that Scalise presumptively lacked sufficient support to win the speakership on a floor vote. Republicans decided to postpone the afternoon's scheduled floor vote to the following day in order to give Scalise time to secure support from holdouts. On October 12, a floor vote was again postponed due to Scalise's inability to win over holdouts, and Scalise ended his candidacy for speaker.

==== Jordan nomination ====
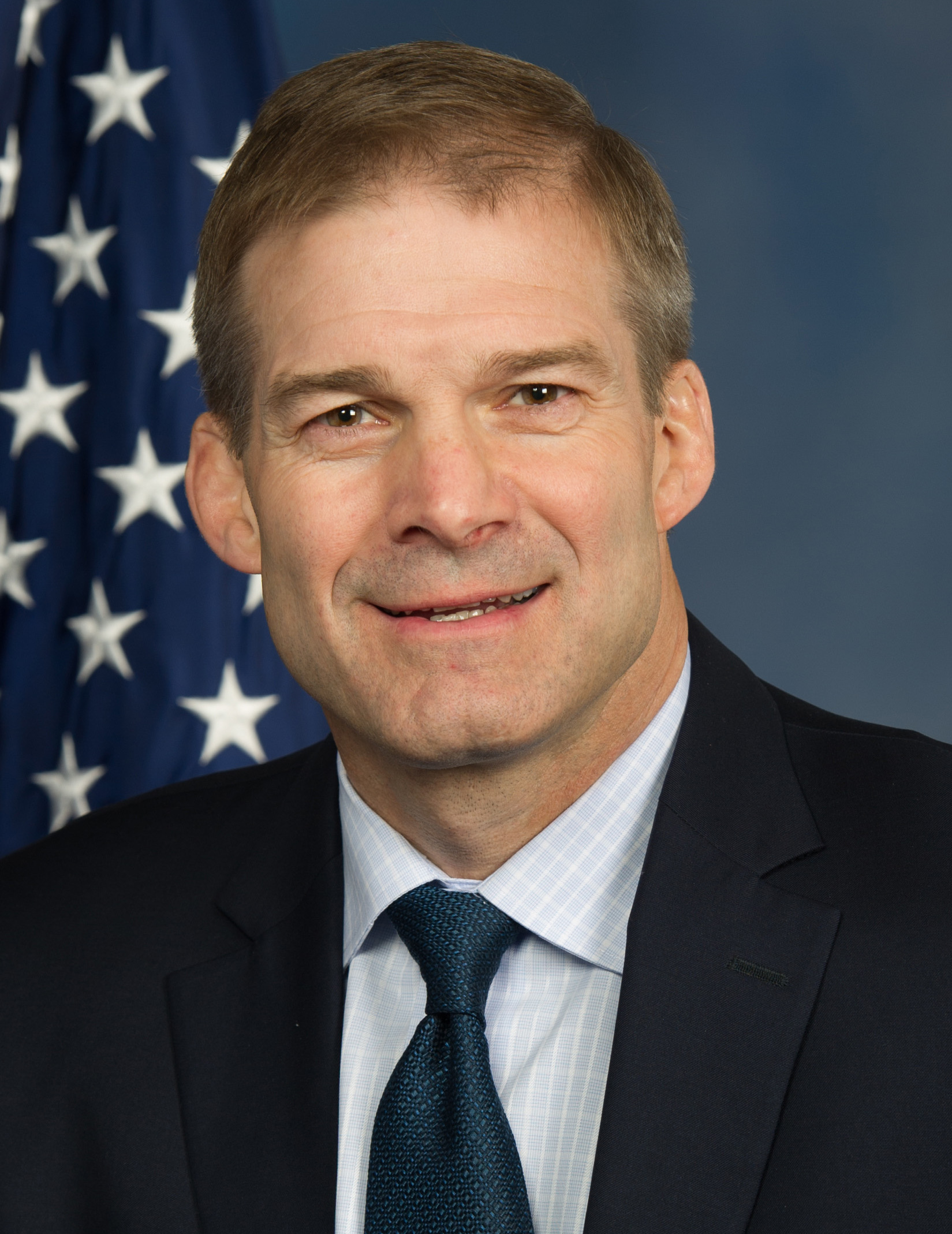
Jim Jordan of Ohio replaced Scalise as the Republican nominee; after losing three ballots over four days on the House floor, he was removed as the conference's nominee on October 20.

The second House Republican Conference vote was held on October 13, 2023. After losing to Steve Scalise in the first vote held on October 11, Jim Jordan won the majority of the votes, becoming the Republican nominee for speaker of the House, despite a late challenge from Austin Scott. Seven members of the conference cast a ballot for someone other than Jordan or Scott, and one member voted present. Mike Johnson also considered running, but decided not to, and endorsed Jordan instead.

Candidate	Votes	Percent
Jim Jordan ✓	124	58.5%
Austin Scott	81	38.2%
Other candidates	7	3.3%
Present	1	—N/a
Did not vote	11	—N/a

Immediately after the second vote, the House Republican Conference held a validation vote asking representatives whether they would support Jordan on the floor. 152 voted yes, while 55 voted no. One member voted present.

	Votes	Percent
Yes ✓	152	73.4%
No	55	26.6%
Present	1	—N/a
Did not vote	16	—N/a

To build support for his candidacy, lawmakers and activists allied with Jordan took to interviews and social media to pressure Republicans to back Jordan. During the four days between the Republican conference vote and the first floor vote on Tuesday, October 17, many influential Republicans who have opposed Jordan, such as Mike Rogers, Ann Wagner, and Ken Calvert, flipped to supporting him. Many previous holdouts changed their support to Jordan as he agreed to link funding for aid to Ukraine and Israel in their respective wars.

=== Calls for a bipartisan coalition ===
On October 4, Democratic representative Vicente Gonzalez suggested that he would be open to doing a deal with House Republicans and vote for a moderate Republican speaker such as McHenry or Congressman Brian Fitzpatrick, who also co-chairs the Problem Solvers Caucus. However on October 5, Fitzpatrick said he had no interest in running for speaker and is only interested in working on behalf of Pennsylvania's 1st congressional district, saying it would be the only office he would ever run for.

In an October 6 op-ed in The Washington Post, Democratic leader Hakeem Jeffries proposed that "Republican partners willing to break with MAGA extremism should work with Democrats in the chamber to strike a deal to form a 'bipartisan governing coalition.'" Jeffries wrote that under such a deal, the "House should be restructured to promote governance by consensus and facilitate up-or-down votes on bills that have strong bipartisan support" and argued that this approach would "reflect the inescapable reality that Republicans are reliant on Democratic support to do the basic work of governing". In an appearance on All In with Chris Hayes on the same day, Democrat Jamie Raskin of Maryland suggested that moderate Republicans should strike a governing deal with Democrats and support Jeffries, an independent like Angus King, or an anti-Trump Republican such as Liz Cheney or Mitt Romney as Speaker. Democratic Congressman Brad Sherman floated the idea of former president George W. Bush becoming the next speaker.

The task of selecting a new speaker took on new urgency with the start of the Gaza war on October 7. With all legislative activity in the U.S. House effectively halted while the speakership was vacant, a bipartisan consensus to authorize more military aid to Israel could not be formally acted upon. In addition, an additional aid package to Ukraine to counter Russia's invasion was a point of contention in the budget negotiations that averted a government shutdown on September 30; the aid to Ukraine was not included in the stopgap bill due to far-right opposition, but Democrats believe a majority exists in the chamber to enact it as a standalone bill. President Biden delivered an Oval Office address on October 19 in which he proposed $105 billion in spending to bolster U.S. leadership in global affairs, including $14 billion in aid to Israel and $60 billion in aid to Ukraine. Moreover, the protracted speaker election had impacted efforts to pass the federal budget for fiscal-year 2024. The continuing resolution enacted on September 30 was set to expire on November 17.

On October 12, Republican congressman Mike Rogers publicly suggested that Republicans would likely have to work with Democrats to elect a speaker, which would be necessary in order to bypass Republican conference holdouts. After Scalise withdrew his candidacy for speaker that same day, several other Republican and Democratic members publicly expressed their openness to the prospect of forming a bipartisan coalition in to elect a new speaker.

== First set of floor votes for speaker ==
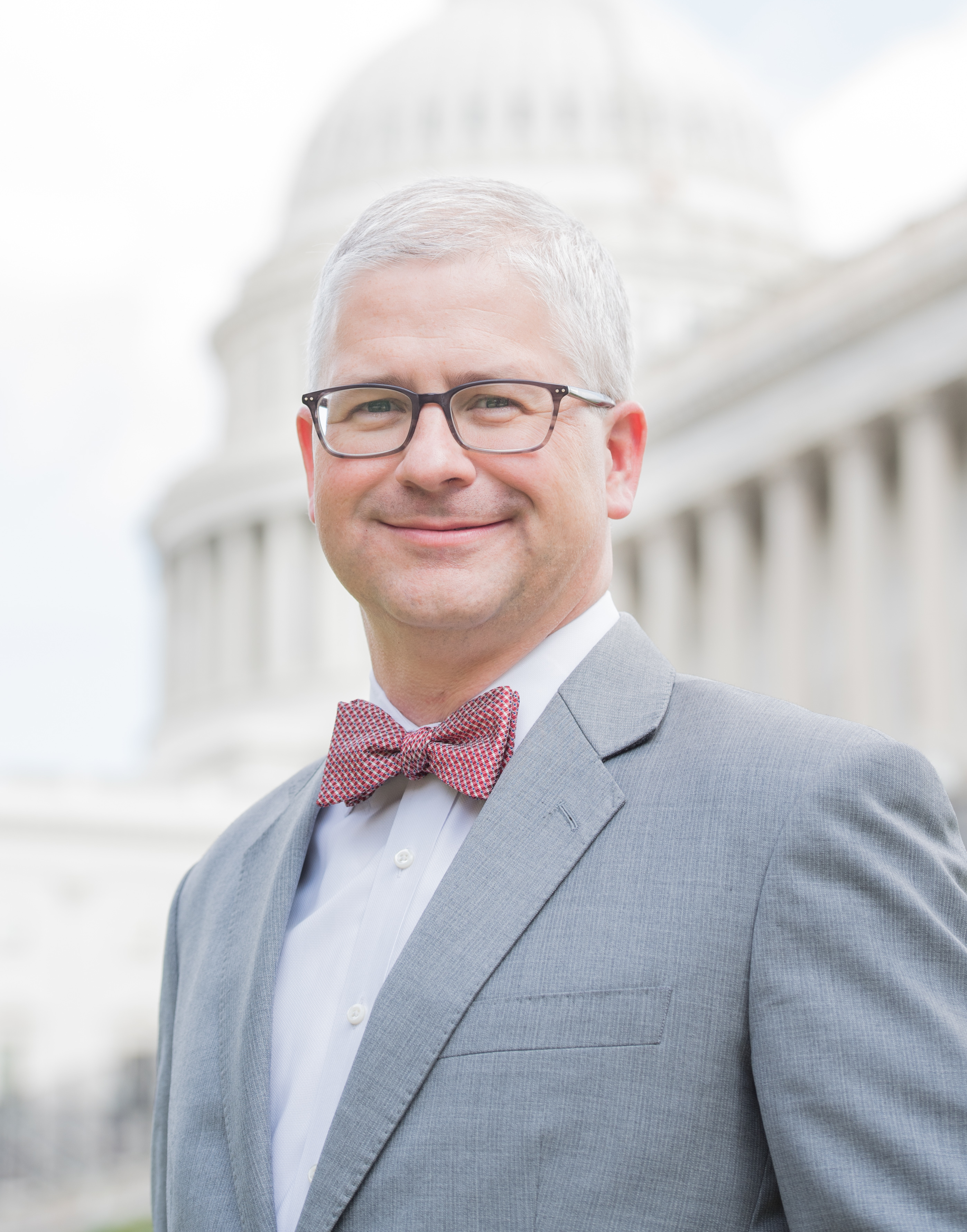
Representative Patrick McHenry, as speaker pro tempore, presided over the election of a new speaker.

The election of the speaker began on October 17, 2023. At the time of the election, there were two vacant seats (Rhode Island's 1st district and Utah's 2nd).

On the first ballot, Elise Stefanik of New York gave a nominating speech for Jordan and Pete Aguilar of California gave a nominating speech for Jeffries. Twenty Republicans voted for someone other than Jordan, and one was absent.

Another round of voting began on October 18. On the second ballot, Tom Cole of Oklahoma nominated Jordan. Aguilar again nominated Jeffries. Twenty-two Republicans voted for someone other than Jordan, with no absent members. Jordan's opposition on the second ballot was greater than any opposition McCarthy faced in the January election. The Washington Post reported that "a coordinated effort" among House Republicans opposed to Jordan would "ensure that he loses more votes each round", which was indeed borne out on the second ballot.

A third vote was expected to take place on October 19, but Jordan postponed the vote; instead backing a plan to temporarily expand the powers of Patrick McHenry as Speaker pro tempore. With the Jordan nomination floundering on the floor of the House after two adverse votes, some members of both parties, including House Minority Leader Hakeem Jeffries, expressed support for expanding Rep. Patrick McHenry's powers as temporary speaker until a permanent speaker could be chosen. While initially opposed to the idea, Jordan, on October 19, announced that he would back a plan to temporarily expand the powers that McHenry has as Speaker pro tempore until January 3, 2024. Later that day, however, he told reporters that there would not be a resolution to expand McHenry's powers, after it became clear that most House Republicans would not support it after a three hour closed-door meeting. Many in the conference echoed the sentiment that the resolution would be "a giant betrayal to Republicans", and some others noted that voting on the resolution "might actually exacerbate divides within the conference" and passing it with the help of Democratic votes "would set off the fuse that would certainly end in civil war within the GOP".

Initially, Jordan announced that a third vote would be scheduled for later in the day, but the vote was later pushed to the next day, October 20. Another round of voting began on October 20. On the third ballot, former Speaker of the House Kevin McCarthy of California nominated Jordan. Katherine Clark of Massachusetts nominated Jeffries. Twenty-five Republicans voted for someone other than Jordan, and four House members were absent.

Observers noted that many of those opposed to Jordan's nomination were from the moderate and more traditionally conservative wings of the party, many of whom represent competitive districts where voting for Jordan, seen as a right-wing figure, may be politically detrimental. Several Republicans who voted against Jordan on the first two ballots reported receiving death threats and other threats to their safety, to themselves and their family members. Ken Buck, Drew Ferguson, and Mariannette Miller-Meeks each said they received death threats. Don Bacon said his wife received threatening messages, and Ferguson said credible threats prompted him to dispatch a sheriff to his daughter's school.

October 2023 election for speaker
Party	Candidate	District	1st ballot October 17		2nd ballot October 18		3rd ballot October 20	
Party	Candidate	District	Votes	%	Votes	%	Votes	%
Democratic	Hakeem Jeffries	NY 8	212	49.1%	212	49.0%	210	49.0%
Republican	Jim Jordan	OH 4	200	46.3%	199	46.0%	194	45.2%
Republican	Steve Scalise	LA 1	7	1.6%	7	1.6%	8	1.9%
Republican	Patrick McHenry	NC 10	—N/a				6	1.4%
Republican	Lee Zeldin	—N/a (Note: Former member of the House.)	3	0.7%	3	0.7%	4	0.9%
Republican	Kevin McCarthy	CA 20	6	1.4%	5	1.2%	2	0.5%
Republican	Byron Donalds	FL 19	—N/a		1	0.2%	2	0.5%
Republican	Tom Emmer	MN 6	1	0.2%	1	0.2%	1	0.2%
Republican	Mike Garcia	CA 27	1	0.2%	1	0.2%	1	0.2%
Republican	Bruce Westerman	AR 4	—N/a		1	0.2%	1	0.2%
Republican	John Boehner	—N/a	—N/a		1	0.2%	—N/a	
Republican	Kay Granger	TX 12	—N/a		1	0.2%	—N/a	
Republican	Candice Miller	—N/a	—N/a		1	0.2%	—N/a	
Republican	Tom Cole	OK 4	1	0.2%	—N/a			
Republican	Thomas Massie	KY 4	1	0.2%	—N/a			
Total votes			432	100%	433	100%	429	100%
Absent			1	—N/a	0	—N/a	4	—N/a
Vacant			2	—N/a	2	—N/a	2	—N/a
Votes needed to win			217	>50%	217	>50%	215	>50%

== Later Republican nominations ==
On October 20, after the three unsuccessful ballots in which an increasing number of Republicans voted against Jordan, the conference reconvened and held a vote on whether to keep or remove Jordan as the party's nominee. 112 voted to remove Jordan, while 86 voted to keep him.

	Votes	Percent
Remove ✓	112	56.6%
Retain	86	43.4%
Present	5	—N/a
Did not vote	21	—N/a

=== Emmer nomination ===
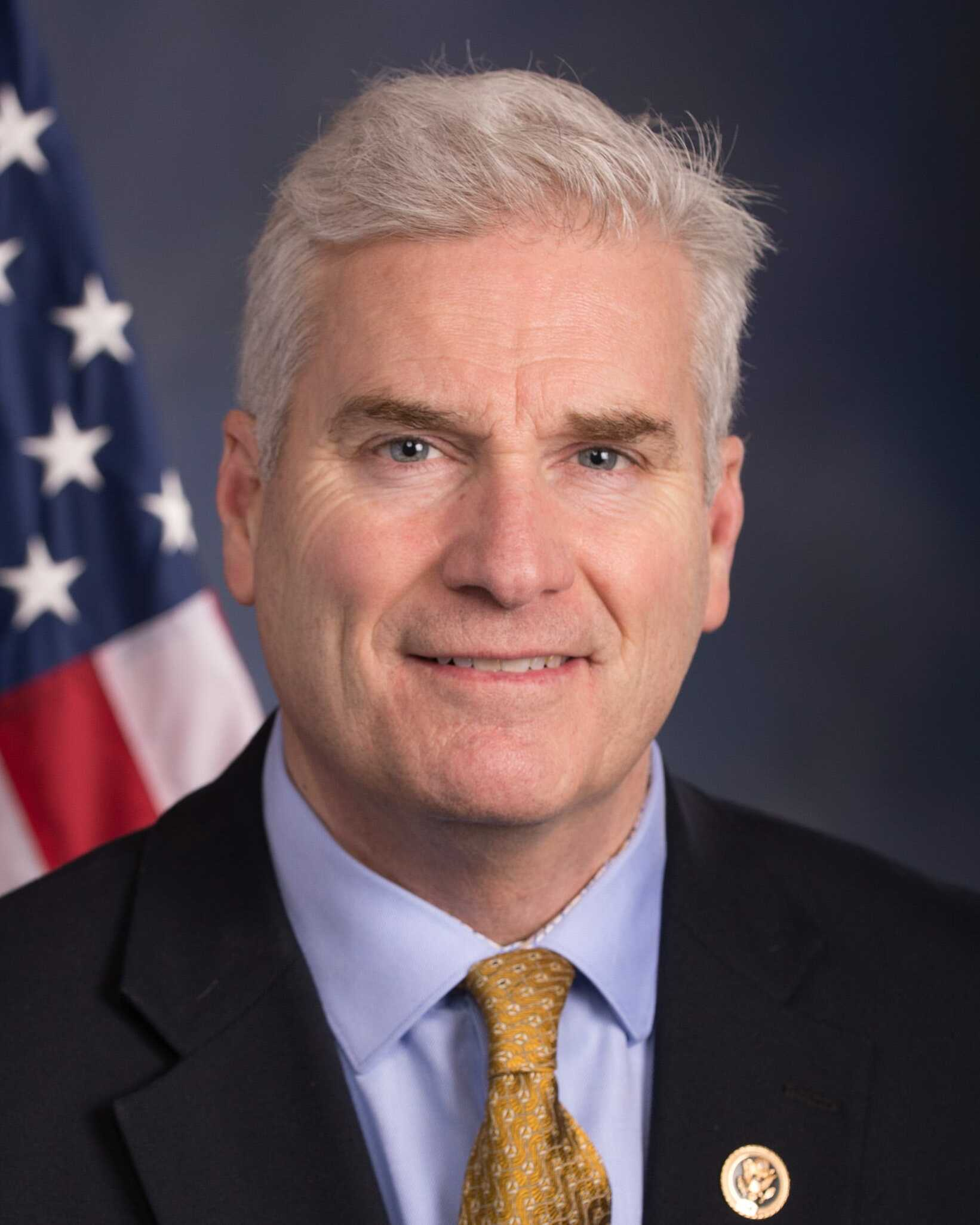
Tom Emmer of Minnesota replaced Jordan as the Republican nominee on October 24, but dropped out shortly thereafter

House Republicans held a candidate forum for nominee candidates on October 23. Each member running for Speaker signed a pledge to support the eventual nominee. They met October 24, to pick a new speaker nominee from a field of seven candidates (originally nine). The voting took place behind closed doors via secret ballot. The candidate receiving the fewest votes in each round was eliminated. Voting continued until the fifth ballot at which point Emmer received a majority of the vote over Rep. Mike Johnson.

Candidate	First ballot		Second ballot		Third ballot		Fourth ballot		Fifth ballot	
Candidate	Votes	Percent	Votes	Percent	Votes	Percent	Votes	Percent	Votes	Percent
Tom Emmer	78	36.3%	90	41.9%	100	46.3%	107	49.3%	✓ 117	53.4%
Mike Johnson	34	15.8%	37	17.2%	43	19.9%	56	25.8%	✗ 97	44.3%
Byron Donalds	29	13.5%	33	15.3%	32	14.8%	✗ 25	11.5%	Withdrawn	
Kevin Hern	27	12.6%	31	14.4%	26	12.0%	✗ 25	11.5%	Eliminated	
Austin Scott	18	8.4%	14	6.5%	✗ 12	5.6%	Eliminated			
Jack Bergman	16	7.4%	✗ 7	3.3%	Eliminated					
Pete Sessions	✗ 8	3.7%	Eliminated							
Write-in	5	2.3%	3	1.4%	3	1.4%	4	1.8%	5	2.3%
Votes cast	215		215		216		217		219	
Present	1	—N/a	2	—N/a	3	—N/a	2	—N/a	1	—N/a
Did not vote	8	—N/a	7	—N/a	5	—N/a	5	—N/a	4	—N/a
Withdrew before vote: Dan Meuser; Gary Palmer

Immediately after the election, the conference held a roll-call vote, where 25 members indicated that they would vote for someone other than Emmer on the House floor or vote present.

Candidate	Votes	Percent
Tom Emmer ✓	193	90.6%
Jim Jordan	15	7.0%
Mike Johnson	4	1.9%
Byron Donalds	1	0.5%
Present	5	—N/a
Did not vote	6	—N/a

After the roll-call vote, former president Donald Trump stated on Truth Social that he opposed Emmer’s bid for speaker, due to Emmer refusing to object to the certification of the Electoral College results in the 2020 presidential election. Trump said that electing Emmer speaker would be "a tragic mistake", and further derided Emmer as a "RINO" in comments made to reporters. Consequentially, Emmer's prospects rapidly evaporated. It became clear that Emmer would be unable to garner enough votes from House Republicans to win the speakership. Only four hours after he was nominated, Emmer withdrew his candidacy for speaker.

=== Johnson nomination ===
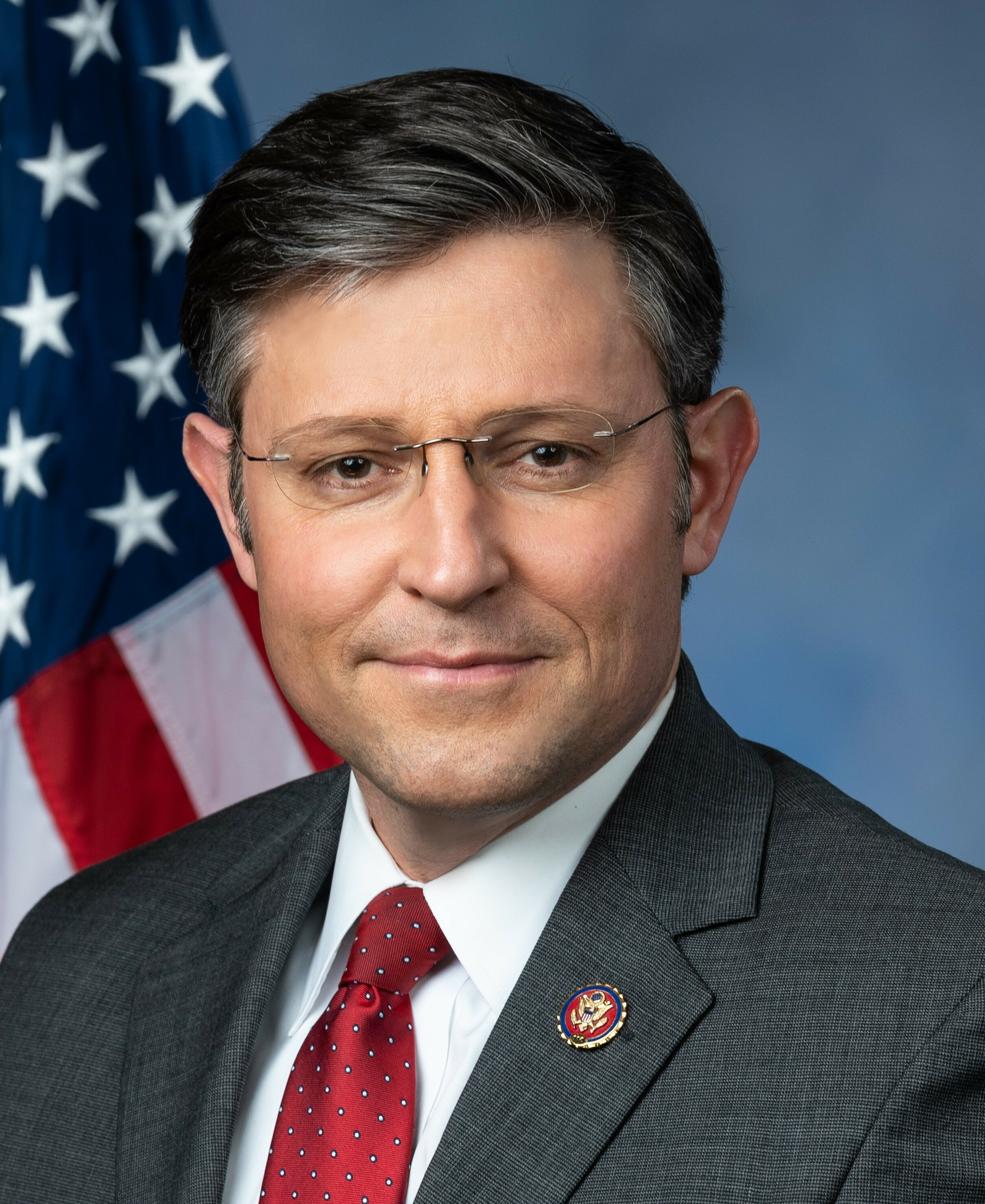
Mike Johnson of Louisiana secured the nomination following Emmer's withdrawal.

Following Emmer's withdrawal, the Republican conference began a fresh attempt to select a new speaker nominee. A candidate forum was held on October 24, beginning at 6 pm EST. It then held a multi-ballot conference vote from which Johnson prevailed.

Candidate	First ballot		Second ballot		Third ballot	
Candidate	Votes	Percent	Votes	Percent	Votes	Percent
Mike Johnson	85	42.1%	97	47.8%	✓ 128	63.7%
Byron Donalds	32	15.8%	31	15.3%	✗ 29	14.4%
Mark Green	23	11.4%	✗ 21	10.3%	Withdrawn	
Roger Williams	21	10.4%	✗ 20	9.9%	Eliminated	
Chuck Fleischmann	✗ 10	5.0%	Eliminated			
Write-in	31	15.3%	34 (Note: Kevin McCarthy received 33 votes; Jim Jordan received 1 vote.)	16.7%	44 (Note: Kevin McCarthy received 43 votes; Jim Jordan received 1 vote.)	21.9%
Votes cast	202		203		201	
Present	2	—N/a	3	—N/a	3	—N/a
Did not vote	20	—N/a	18	—N/a	20	—N/a
Withdrew before vote: Kevin Hern

The conference then held a roll call vote to indicate the level of support for Johnson's nomination on the floor. All named votes were in his favor, with three voting present and 22 not voting or absent.

Candidate	Votes	Percent
Mike Johnson ✓	199 (Note: Unverified number; calculated.)	100%
Present	3	—N/a
Did not vote	22	—N/a

== Final floor vote ==
A fourth speaker ballot occurred on October 25. On the fourth ballot, Elise Stefanik of New York gave a nominating speech for Johnson and Pete Aguilar of California gave a nominating speech for Jeffries. Johnson was elected with 220 votes, surpassing the 215-vote threshold required to win with 429 members present. On the fourth ballot, every present member voted for their party nominee; there were no defectors.

October 2023 election for speaker
Party	Candidate	District	4th ballot October 25	
Party	Candidate	District	Votes	%
Republican	Mike Johnson	LA 4	220	51.3%
Democratic	Hakeem Jeffries	NY 8	209	48.7%
Total votes			429	100%
Absent			4	—N/a
Vacant			2	—N/a
Votes needed to win			215	>50%

== All ballots: votes not cast for party nominee ==
All House members voted for their party's nominee on every ballot, except those members noted here.

Member	Party	District	Ballot vote cast			
Member	Party	District	1st ballot October 17	2nd ballot October 18	3rd ballot October 20	4th ballot October 25
Don Bacon	Republican	NE 2	McCarthy		McHenry	Johnson
Gus Bilirakis	Republican	FL 12	absent (Note: Bilirakis missed the first ballot to attend the funeral of his mother-in-law.)	Jordan		Johnson
Brendan Boyle	Democratic	PA 2	Jeffries			absent (Note: Boyle missed the fourth ballot as he was en route back to DC after going home to be with his wife for her surgery.)
Vern Buchanan	Republican	FL 16	Jordan	Donalds		Johnson
Ken Buck	Republican	CO 4	Emmer			Johnson
Lori Chavez-DeRemer	Republican	OR 5	McCarthy		McHenry	Johnson
Lou Correa	Democratic	CA 46	Jeffries			absent (Note: Correa missed the fourth ballot due to a family emergency.)
Anthony D'Esposito	Republican	NY 4	Zeldin			Johnson
Mario Díaz-Balart	Republican	FL 26	Scalise			Johnson
Jake Ellzey	Republican	TX 6	Garcia			Johnson
Drew Ferguson	Republican	GA 3	Jordan	Scalise		Johnson
Brian Fitzpatrick	Republican	PA 1	Jordan		McHenry	Johnson
Andrew Garbarino	Republican	NY 2	Zeldin			Johnson
Carlos Giménez	Republican	FL 28	McCarthy			Johnson
Tony Gonzales	Republican	TX 23	Scalise			Johnson
Vicente Gonzalez	Democratic	TX 34	Jeffries		absent (Note: Gonzalez missed the third and fourth ballots due to a death in his family.)	
Kay Granger	Republican	TX 12	Scalise			Johnson
Wesley Hunt	Republican	TX 38	Jordan		absent (Note: Hunt missed the third ballot for undisclosed reasons.)	Johnson
John James	Republican	MI 10	Cole	Miller	Donalds	Johnson
Tom Kean	Republican	NJ 7	Jordan		McCarthy	Johnson
Mike Kelly	Republican	PA 16	Scalise	Boehner	Scalise	Johnson
Jen Kiggans	Republican	VA 2	McCarthy		McHenry	Johnson
Nick LaLota	Republican	NY 1	Zeldin			Johnson
Doug LaMalfa	Republican	CA 1	McCarthy	Jordan		Johnson
Mike Lawler	Republican	NY 17	McCarthy		McHenry	Johnson
Mariannette Miller-Meeks	Republican	IA 1	Jordan	Granger	McHenry	Johnson
Marc Molinaro	Republican	NY 19	Jordan		Zeldin	Johnson
Donald Payne Jr.	Democratic	NJ 10	Jeffries		absent (Note: Payne missed the third ballot due to what was described as a "minor health issue". Payne died six months later.)	Jeffries
John Rutherford	Republican	FL 5	Scalise			Johnson
Mike Simpson	Republican	ID 2	Scalise			Johnson
Victoria Spartz	Republican	IN 5	Massie	Jordan		Johnson
Pete Stauber	Republican	MN 8	Jordan	Westerman		Johnson
Derrick Van Orden	Republican	WI 3	Jordan		absent (Note: Van Orden missed the third and fourth ballots as he embarked on what he described as a "fact-finding mission" in Israel.)	
Steve Womack	Republican	AR 3	Scalise			Johnson

== Timeline ==
- October 2: Gaetz files a motion to vacate the chair
- October 3: McCarthy is removed as speaker after the House votes to adopt the motion to vacate the chair. McHenry becomes acting speaker and immediately calls the House into recess
- October 4: Scalise, Jordan, and Hern declare themselves candidates for the Republican Conference's nomination
- October 5: Former president Donald Trump announces that he will not seek the Republican Conference nomination for the speakership, and will instead support Jordan's candidacy
- October 7: Gaza war begins, adding greater urgency to the selection of a new speaker
- October 10: Democratic Caucus votes unanimously for Jeffries to be its nominee
- October 11: Republican Conference votes by secret ballot for Scalise to be its nominee, with Scalise defeating Jordan
- October 12: Scalise withdraws his candidacy
- October 13: Republican Conference votes by secret ballot for Jordan to be its nominee, with Jordan defeating Austin Scott. Republican Conference then holds a roll call vote in which 55 members indicate that they would not commit to voting for Jordan in a floor vote
- October 17–18: Two House floor votes fail to produce a speaker
- October 19: Jordan proposes expanding McHenry's powers as acting speaker until January 3, 2024. Hours later, due to opposition within the Republican Conference, Jordan abandons this proposal
- October 20:
  - A third floor vote fails to produce a speaker
  - Republican Conference holds an internal vote on whether it supports retaining Jordan as its nominee and votes to revoke their nomination of Jordan
- October 23: Republican Conference holds a candidate forum
- October 24:
  - Republican Conference votes by secret ballot for Emmer to be its nominee, with Emmer defeating Johnson, Byron Donalds, Kevin Hern, Austin Scott, Jack Bergman, and Pete Sessions. Republican Conference then holds a roll call vote in which 25 members indicate that they would not commit to supporting Emmer in a floor vote
  - Emmer withdraws his candidacy approximately four hours after becoming the Republican Conference nominee
  - Republican Conference votes by secret ballot for Johnson to be its nominee, with Johnson defeating Byron Donalds, Mark Green, Roger Williams, and Chuck Fleischmann. Republican Conference then holds a roll call vote in which 196 members indicate that they will support Johnson in a floor vote, but in which 3 members indicate that they will vote "present" and 22 members are either absent or otherwise cast no vote
- October 25: On the fourth overall floor vote, Johnson is elected speaker

== Aftermath ==
=== Governance by informal coalition ===
The underlying divisions in the Republican Conference remained after Johnson's election as speaker, necessitating him to turn to the same bipartisan legislative coalition which had doomed Speaker McCarthy to pass major legislation. This resulted in the empowering of the minority caucus with House Minority Leader Hakeem Jeffries stating that Democrats “effectively have been governing as if we were in the majority."

=== Attempt to remove Mike Johnson ===
On March 22, 2024, Republican representative Marjorie Taylor Greene filed a motion to vacate against Speaker Mike Johnson, after the latter put up for a vote an omnibus spending bill opposed by a majority of the Republican Conference, a violation of the Hastert rule. The motion was non-privileged and did not trigger an immediate vote, due to Greene's decision to introduce it through regular channels rather than on the floor. Greene claimed the motion was merely "a warning" and didn't commit to forcing a vote on it. Over the next month, two Republicans, Thomas Massie and Paul Gosar, joined as cosponsors. Republicans' extremely slim margin in the House meant that, if all Democrats had joined the three Republican rebels in voting for Greene's motion, Johnson would have been ousted. However, on April 30, House Democratic leaders announced that they would provide the votes to save Johnson's speakership. Democratic leaders praised Johnson for his role in providing funding to the federal government and aid to Ukraine. Opponents of Johnson were initially considered unlikely to force a vote on the motion unless or until it had enough support to pass, but, after the announcement, Greene stated she would trigger the motion to vacate during the week of May 6. The motion was officially triggered on May 8.

Immediately after the motion was invoked, House Majority Leader Steve Scalise asked for a vote to table (kill) the motion to vacate. The vote to table was successful, meaning the motion to vacate was removed from consideration and Mike Johnson was allowed to remain as Speaker.

Vote to table
Party	Yes	No	Present	Not voting
Republican	196	11	—N/a	10
Democratic	163	32	7	11
Percentage	✓ 89.3%	10.7%	—N/a	
Total votes	✓ 359	43	7	21

Members who voted against the motion to table or voted present
District	Member	Party	Vote
California 44	Nanette Diaz Barragán	Democrat	✗ No
Arizona 5	Andy Biggs	Republican	✗ No
New York 16	Jamaal Bowman	Democrat	✗ No
Missouri 7	Eric Burlison	Republican	✗ No
Missouri 1	Cori Bush	Democrat	✗ No
Texas 35	Greg Casar	Democrat	✗ No
Texas 20	Joaquin Castro	Democrat	✗ No
California 28	Judy Chu	Democrat	Present
New York 9	Yvette D. Clarke	Democrat	✗ No
Arizona 2	Eli Crane	Republican	✗ No
Virginia 11	Gerald E. Connolly	Democrat	✗ No
Ohio 8	Warren Davidson	Republican	✗ No
Colorado 1	Diana DeGette	Democrat	✗ No
Texas 37	Lloyd Doggett	Democrat	✗ No
Texas 16	Veronica Escobar	Democrat	✗ No
Florida 10	Maxwell Frost	Democrat	✗ No
California 8	John Garamendi	Democrat	✗ No
Illinois 4	Chuy García	Democrat	Present
Texas 29	Sylvia R. Garcia	Democrat	✗ No
California 42	Robert Garcia	Democrat	✗ No
California 34	Jimmy Gomez	Democrat	✗ No
Arizona 9	Paul A. Gosar	Republican	✗ No
Georgia 14	Marjorie Taylor Greene	Republican	✗ No
California 9	Josh Harder	Democrat	✗ No
Illinois 1	Jonathan Jackson	Democrat	✗ No
Washington 7	Pramila Jayapal	Democrat	✗ No
California 37	Sydney Kamlager-Dove	Democrat	✗ No
California 12	Barbara Lee	Democrat	✗ No
Pennsylvania 12	Summer Lee	Democrat	✗ No
Kentucky 4	Thomas Massie	Republican	✗ No
New Jersey 8	Robert Menendez	Democrat	✗ No
West Virginia 2	Alexander X. Mooney	Republican	✗ No
Alabama 2	Barry Moore	Republican	✗ No
New York 14	Alexandria Ocasio-Cortez	Democrat	✗ No
Minnesota 5	Ilhan Omar	Democrat	Present
Wisconsin 2	Mark Pocan	Democrat	Present
Massachusetts 7	Ayanna Pressley	Democrat	✗ No
Illinois 3	Delia C. Ramirez	Democrat	✗ No
Texas 21	Chip Roy	Republican	✗ No
New York 18	Patrick Ryan	Democrat	✗ No
Pennsylvania 5	Mary Gay Scanlon	Democrat	✗ No
Illinois 9	Janice D. Schakowsky	Democrat	Present
Indiana 5	Victoria Spartz	Republican	✗ No
California 39	Mark Takano	Democrat	Present
Michigan 12	Rashida Tlaib	Democrat	✗ No
California 35	Norma J. Torres	Democrat	Present
New York 7	Nydia M. Velázquez	Democrat	✗ No
California 43	Maxine Waters	Democrat	✗ No
New Jersey 12	Bonnie Watson Coleman	Democrat	✗ No
Georgia 5	Nikema Williams	Democrat	✗ No

== See also ==
- List of Speaker of the United States House of Representatives elections
- Speaker of the United States House of Representatives
