= Ken Buck =

American politician (born 1959)

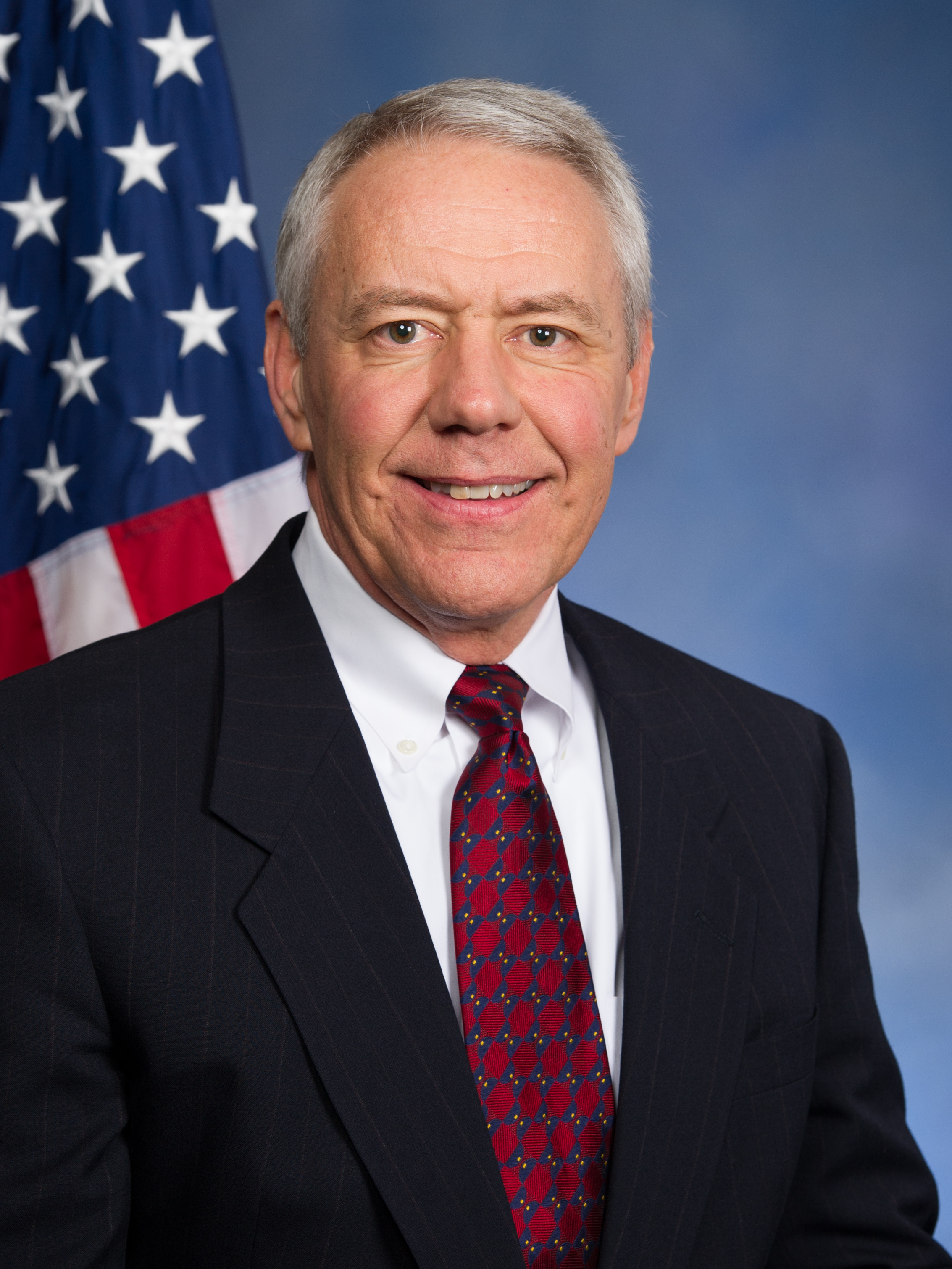
- Official portrait, 2014

Member of the U.S. House of Representatives from Colorado's 4th district
- In office January 3, 2015 – March 22, 2024
- Preceded by: Cory Gardner
- Succeeded by: Greg Lopez

Chair of the Colorado Republican Party
- In office March 30, 2019 – March 27, 2021
- Preceded by: Jeff Hays
- Succeeded by: Kristi Burton Brown

District Attorney of Weld County
- In office 2004–2014
- Preceded by: Al Dominguez
- Succeeded by: Michael Rourke

Personal details
- Born: Kenneth Robert Buck; February 16, 1959 (age 67) Ossining, New York, U.S.
- Party: Republican
- Spouse(s): Dayna Roane (m. 1984; div. 1994) Perry Webster (m. 1996; div. 2018)
- Children: 2
- Education: Princeton University (BA); University of Wyoming (JD)
- Ken Buck's voice Buck supporting legislation on contributions to the World Bank and IDA and on CFPB authority over home mortgages. Recorded January 17, 2018

Kenneth Robert Buck (born February 16, 1959) is an American lawyer and politician who represented Colorado's 4th congressional district in the United States House of Representatives from 2015 until his resignation in 2024. Buck served as chair of the Colorado Republican Party, from 2019 to 2021. Formerly the District Attorney for Weld County, Colorado, Buck ran unsuccessfully for U.S. Senate in 2010, losing to Democrat Michael Bennet.

In Congress, Buck joined the Freedom Caucus, and emerged as a staunch fiscal conservative, as well as one of the foremost proponents of antitrust enforcement in the Republican Party.

Buck announced in November 2023 that he would not seek a sixth House term, stating that his party's "insidious narratives breed widespread cynicism and erode Americans' confidence in the rule of law." On March 12, 2024, Buck announced he would resign from Congress at the end of the following week on March 22, 2024. Governor Jared Polis scheduled the special election for Buck's replacement for June 25.

== Early life and education ==
Buck was born in Ossining, New York, in 1959. He and his two brothers were encouraged by their parents, Ruth (Larsen) and James Buck, both New York lawyers, to attend Ivy League colleges. Buck earned a Bachelor of Arts degree in politics from Princeton University in 1981 with a 75-page long senior thesis titled "Saudi Arabia: Caught Between a Rock and a Hard Place". Buck later said that the Princeton degree was "more important to [my father] than me".

At Princeton, Buck played four years of football on the Princeton Tigers football team, including one year as a defensive back/punter/kicker and three years as a punter, earning All-Ivy League honors as a punter his senior year. After college, he worked in Wyoming at the state legislative services office and received a Juris Doctor from the University of Wyoming College of Law in 1985. He was also an instructor at the University of Denver Law School and for the National Institute for Trial Advocacy in Colorado.

== Career ==
=== U.S. Attorney's Office ===
In 1986, Buck was hired by Congressman Dick Cheney to work on the Iran–Contra investigation. Following that assignment, he worked as a prosecutor with the U.S. Department of Justice in Washington D.C.

In 1990, Buck joined the United States Attorney's Office for the District of Colorado, where he became Chief of the Criminal Division. Buck was formally reprimanded and required to take ethics classes in 2001 for a meeting he had with defense attorneys about a felony case he thought should not be pursued. Only one of the three men initially indicted on felony charges was convicted for a misdemeanor offense. Buck said he is "not proud" of the incident that effectively ended his career with the Justice Department, but that he felt it was unethical to prosecute such a "weak" case. One of the three men donated $700 to Buck's 2010 Senate campaign.

=== Weld County District Attorney ===
Buck was elected the District Attorney for Weld County, Colorado, in 2004. When he suspected that Social Security numbers were being stolen by undocumented immigrants, he raided a tax service in Greeley, Colorado, and seized more than 5,000 tax files. The American Civil Liberties Union sued Buck's office for violating the privacy of the service's clients and after an appeal to the Colorado Supreme Court, costing the county approximately $150,000, the raid was deemed unconstitutional. Buck has said that his time enforcing laws for the Justice Department and Weld County stoked his desire to become a lawmaker himself.

==== Rape case controversy ====
During the 2010 Senate race, The Colorado Independent ran an article titled "Suspect in 2005 Buck rape case said he knew it was rape." The article, about a case Buck refused to prosecute in 2006, included a complete transcript of a tape between the victim and her attacker, including the following dialogue:

Victim: "You do realize that ... it's rape."
Suspect: "Yeah, I do."
Victim: "Like in a number of different ways, because I didn't want to do it and because I was intoxicated and because I was afraid."
Suspect: "Yes I do. I know."

The tape, which Greeley police had the victim record during its investigation, was available before Buck made his decision not to prosecute the woman's admitted rapist. According to a following article in the Independent, "Buck's refusal to prosecute 2005 rape case reverberates in U.S. Senate race", the reporter provides a transcript of another tape of a conversation between the woman and Buck, in which "Buck appears to all but blame her for the rape and tells her that her case would never fly with a Weld County jury."

Buck told the Greeley Tribune in 2006: "A jury could very well conclude that this is a case of buyer's remorse." The victim told the Colorado Independent in 2010: "That comment made me feel horrible. The offender admitted he did it, but Ken Buck said I was to blame. Had he [Buck] not attacked me, I might have let it go. But he put the blame on me, and I was furious. I still am furious." According to the Independent, "A man entered the alleged victim's apartment and had sex with her while she was drunk, she says. As she passed in and out of consciousness, she says she told him 'no' and tried to push him away. If he had been a stranger, the case may have played out differently, but he was a former lover, and she had invited him over." In the meeting that she recorded, Buck said, "It appears to me … that you invited him over to have sex with him," and that he thought she might have wanted to file rape charges to retaliate against the man for some bad feeling left over from when they had been lovers more than a year earlier. According to the Independent, "Buck also comes off on this tape as being at least as concerned with the woman's sexual history and alcohol consumption as he is with other facts of the case." Drawing on Buck's abortion stance, the Independent wrote, "The suspect in this case had claimed that the victim had at one point a year or so before this event become pregnant with his child and had an abortion, which she denies, saying she miscarried. The suspect's claim, though, is in the police report, and Buck refers to it as a reason she may be motivated to file charges where he thinks none are warranted."

=== Attempted falsification of Colorado Assembly GOP primary ===
On May 6, 2020, The Denver Post published a recording of a conference call between Buck and local Republican party official Eli Bremer, who confirmed the authenticity of the recording. In the recording, Buck first asked Bremer if he understood "the order of the executive committee and the central committee" to put activist David Stiver "on the ballot" in the November 2020 election for the District 10 state senate seat. Stiver had not qualified for the November ballot because he only received 24% of votes from Republicans in the district, short of the 30% qualifying mark. Bremer replied: "Uh, yes, sir, I understand the central committee has adopted a resolution that requires me to sign a false affidavit to the state". Buck continued: "And will you do so?" Bremer replied: "I will seek legal counsel as I am being asked to sign an affidavit that states Mr. Stiver received 30% of the vote. I need to seek legal counsel to find out if I am putting myself in jeopardy of a misdemeanor for doing that." Buck lastly asked: "And you understand that it is the order of the central committee that you do so?", to which Bremer replied he understood, and reiterated he would seek legal advice.

Buck told The Denver Post on May 6 that Colorado political party committees traditionally made such decisions. The primary between Stiver and his opponent had been unfair due to the impact of the COVID-19 pandemic in Colorado, Buck said. He further claimed he was not asking Bremer "to commit fraud", but asking "if he understood the decision of the central committee and if he was willing to follow the request of the Republican central committee". Buck also said he had no "personal stake in the process". Meanwhile, Bremer decried that the Republican Party he belonged to was "for the rule of law except when it applies to us".

== 2010 U.S. Senate campaign ==
=== Republican primary ===
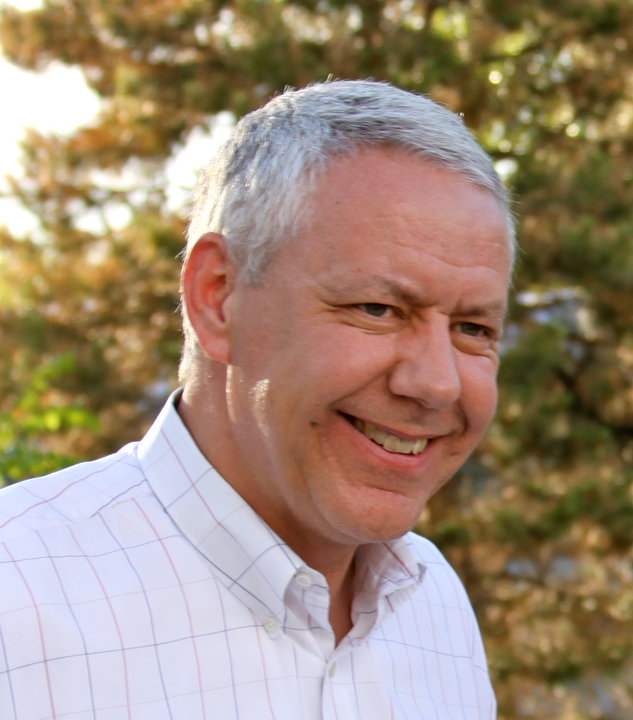
Buck in 2010

Angered by what he later called the nation's "lurch to the left," Buck announced his candidacy for U.S. Senate on April 28, 2009. In his first run for statewide office, Buck frequently referenced national issues in defining his goals as a U.S. senator. Among these were his opposition to the Patient Protection and Affordable Care Act, the Troubled Asset Relief Program (a program of federal economic stimulus initiated under President George W. Bush and finalized under President Barack Obama) and the role of federal policy czars. Buck also stressed mounting governmental debt, an issue to which he frequently returned during the primary campaign. Contrasting himself to what he argued was the "top down" style of early Republican favorite Lieutenant Governor Jane Norton, Buck pledged a "bottom-up" campaign that would include visits to each of Colorado's 64 counties.

Initially Norton was seen to have had a nearly insurmountable advantage against "a band of underfunded unknowns" that included Buck, who early in the primary season was called "a dead-in-the-water Republican U.S. Senate candidate with laughable fundraising totals and little establishment GOP support". Norton's staff at the beginning of the campaign was twice the size of Buck's. He attempted to make a virtue of his meager war chest by positioning "himself as the small-money underdog" in an election cycle that saw a "populist push for outsider candidates to upset the Washington establishment".

After receiving nearly $600,000 in a television advertising support from Americans for Job Security and a victory in March at the state party's caucuses, Buck began to receive endorsements and notice. By late spring of 2010, Colorado had highly competitive Republican and Democratic primaries.

Although Buck positioned himself as the candidate for the Tea Party movement during the Republican primary, he stirred controversy at times with remarks critical of former Representative Tom Tancredo, a Tea Party favorite, and the statement "Will you tell those dumbasses at the Tea Party to stop asking questions about birth certificates while I'm on the camera?"—a reference to those suspicious of President Barack Obama's place of birth. Buck blamed the comments on his exhaustion and frustration after months of campaigning, and on his exasperation that it was difficult to keep debate focused on the mounting governmental debt. Tea Party leader Lu Busse criticized Buck's "choice of words" and inclination to treat all Tea Party adherents as a uniform group.

Buck again stirred controversy by suggesting voters should cast their votes for him over Norton because, unlike Norton, "I do not wear high heels." Buck later said he was responding to Norton's television ad claiming he was not "man enough" to attack her himself. (According to a mass email sent on behalf of Senator Jim DeMint, it was a joking paraphrase of his opponent's suggestion to vote for her "because I wear high heels.")

Making reference to Buck's mandatory ethics classes, Norton argued that she "didn't need an ethics class to know what's right. ... Ken broke the rules, and the facts speak for themselves." After Buck's former supervisor, then-U.S. Attorney John Suthers, endorsed Norton, the Colorado Democratic Party Chair called for Buck's resignation from his Weld County post because of his "career bypassing justice and ethics to reward political allies and campaign contributors".

On August 10, Buck defeated Norton in the Republican primary, 52% to 48%, the end of "a bitterly contested primary that saw him go from an obscure and cash-starved underdog to a gaffe-prone mascot for anti-establishment conservatives [in Colorado] and nationally."

=== General Election ===
This was one of the most expensive elections in the nation, as more than $30 million was spent by outside organizations. Conservative third party groups hammered Bennet for voting 92% of the time with the Democratic leadership, including voting for healthcare reform and the stimulus package. Liberal third party groups called Buck extremist. Bennet focused on attacking Buck's views on abortion, which he believed should be banned, including in cases of rape and incest. He was also attacked for wanting to eliminate the Seventeenth Amendment and refusing to prosecute an alleged rapist as Weld County district attorney. Planned Parenthood mounted a mail campaign, targeting women voters with the warning that "Colorado women can't trust Ken Buck." Bennet won women's vote by 17 points, according to exit polls. After the election, Buck conceded to the Denver Post that the main reason he lost was because of social issues.

In the November 2010 general election, Buck lost to appointed Senator Michael Bennet, by 29,896 votes.

== U.S. House of Representatives ==
=== Elections ===
==== 2014 ====
On August 19, 2013, Buck emailed supporters and announced that the lymphoma he had been diagnosed with was in remission following treatment and he would run against Senator Mark Udall in 2014. He had already filed to run on August 7, 2013, before he sent out the email. In March 2014, Buck withdrew from the race following the entrance of Cory Gardner and decided instead to run for Gardner's seat in Colorado's 4th congressional district.

Buck won the Republican primary, defeating three other candidates with 44% of the vote. He defeated Democratic nominee Vic Meyers in the general election with 65% of the vote.

==== 2016 ====
Buck ran for reelection unopposed in the Republican primary. He defeated Democratic nominee Bob Seay in the general election with 63.5% of the vote.

==== 2018 ====
Buck ran for reelection unopposed in the Republican primary. He defeated Democratic nominee Karen McCormick in the general election with 60.6% of the vote.

==== 2020 ====
Buck ran for reelection unopposed in the Republican primary. He defeated Democratic nominee Ike McCorkle in the general election with 60.1% of the vote.

==== 2022 ====
Buck won the Republican primary, defeating Robert Lewis. He defeated Democratic nominee Ike McCorkle a second time in the general election with 60.9% of the vote.

=== Tenure ===
==== Taxation ====
Buck voted in favor of the Tax Cuts and Jobs Act of 2017. He said the bill is "fairer for American families" and that it would "keep more jobs in America."

==== COVID-19 pandemic response ====
On March 4, 2020, Buck was one of only two representatives to vote against an $8.3 billion emergency aid package meant to help the United States respond to the COVID-19 pandemic. He subsequently voted against the March 14, 2020 Coronavirus Relief Bill that passed the House by a vote of 363–40.

While vaccines were approved for use to prevent the coronavirus and being distributed, Buck told Fox News he would refuse inoculation: "I will not be taking the vaccine. I'm an American. I have the freedom to decide if I'm going to take a vaccine or not and in this case I am not going to take the vaccine. I'm more concerned about the safety of the vaccine than I am the side effects of the disease."

==== Impeachment attempts ====
In September 2023, Buck came out against House Speaker Kevin McCarthy's decision to announce an impeachment inquiry into President Joe Biden. The inquiry was launched by McCarthy to uncover alleged corruption on the part of the President in relation to his son Hunter's business dealings. Buck said that McCarthy and Republicans pushing the inquiry did not have enough evidence to launch it and said it relied on "fictitious" facts and "imagined history." Nevertheless, Buck would vote to formalize inquiry.

In February 2024, Buck was one of three Republicans who voted against impeaching Secretary of Homeland Security Alejandro Mayorkas on both motions. Much like the Biden impeachment, Buck found the charges against Mayorkas to be inappropriate.

==== Debt ceiling ====
In April 2023, Buck was one of only four Republican representatives who voted against the proposed Limit, Save, Grow Act, which raised the debt ceiling while at the same time providing for cuts to non-mandatory spending; he explained in a subsequent Washington Times op-ed that "[i]f this plan with modest spending reductions is the best the GOP can provide, Americans could be forgiven for wondering what the point of a Republican majority in the House is."

Later the same year, Buck was also among the 71 Republicans who voted against the Fiscal Responsibility Act of 2023.

==== Removal of Speaker McCarthy ====
On October 3, 2023, Buck was one of eight Republicans who voted to remove Kevin McCarthy as Speaker of the House; he cited McCarthy's broken promises on spending negotiations as the main reason for his vote.

He also was one of 20 Republicans to support a candidate other than Jim Jordan on the first ballot of the October 2023 Speaker vote, as he was concerned about Jordan's stance on the January 6 United States Capitol attack and his denial about the results of the 2020 presidential election.

==== Expulsion of George Santos ====
On November 17, 2023, after a report from the House Ethics Committee, Buck announced his support of expelling Representative George Santos from Congress. Buck voted to expel Santos on December 1, 2023.

==== Retirement from House ====
Buck announced on November 1, 2023, that he would not seek a sixth House term in the November 2024 election. He spent most of his three-minute video announcement chastising fellow Republicans for being "obsessively fixated on retribution and vengeance for contrived injustices of the past." He continued that "Too many Republican leaders are lying to America, claiming that the 2020 election was stolen, describing January 6 as an unguided tour of the Capitol and asserting that the ensuing prosecutions are a weaponization of our justice system." He asserted, "Our nation is on a collision course with reality, and a steadfast commitment to truth — even uncomfortable truths — is the only way forward."

Buck announced on March 12, 2024, that he would leave Congress within days, rather than when his term expired in January 2025. He said, "It is the worst year of the nine years and three months that I've been in Congress. And having talked to former members, it's the worst year in 40, 50 years to be in Congress. But I'm leaving because I think there's a job to do out there that I want to go do." The Freedom Caucus symbolically ejected Buck days before his departure, citing differences on "major issues", such as his disdain for the Caucus's election denialism and opposing the impeachment votes.

=== Committee assignments ===
For the 118th Congress:

- Committee on Foreign Affairs
  - Subcommittee on the Indo-Pacific
  - Subcommittee on Western Hemisphere
- Committee on the Judiciary
  - Subcommittee on Immigration Integrity, Security, and Enforcement
  - Subcommittee on the Administrative State, Regulatory Reform, and Antitrust

=== Caucus memberships ===
- Congressional Taiwan Caucus
- Congressional Western Caucus
- Congressional Antitrust Caucus
- Freedom Caucus
- Republican Study Committee
- Second Amendment Caucus
- Freedom from Big Tech Caucus

== Political positions ==
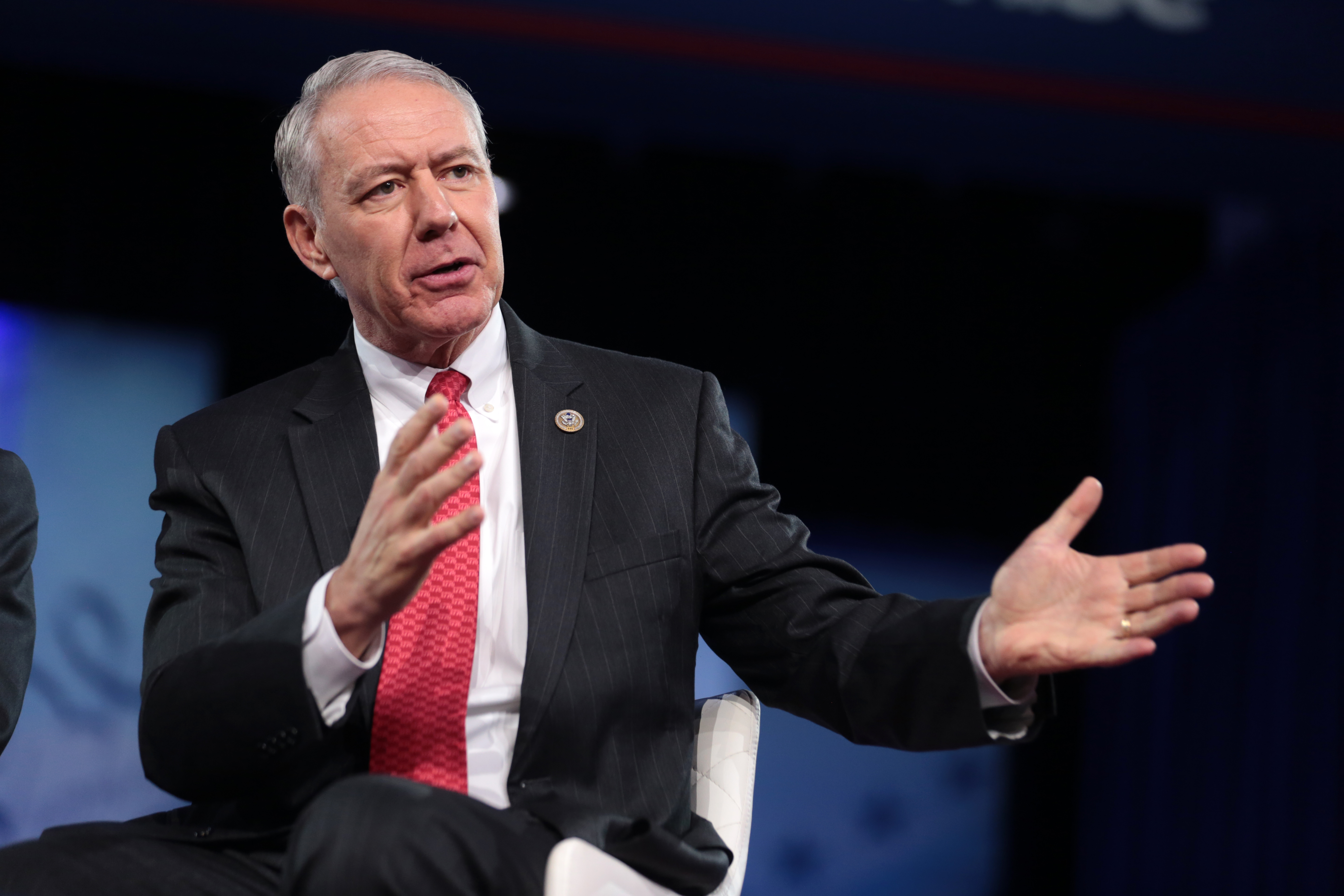
Ken Buck speaking at the 2017 Conservative Political Action Conference (CPAC) in National Harbor, Maryland.

=== 2020 presidential election and aftermath ===
In December 2020, Buck was one of 126 Republican members of the House of Representatives to sign an amicus brief in support of Texas v. Pennsylvania, a lawsuit filed at the United States Supreme Court contesting the results of the 2020 presidential election, in which Joe Biden defeated incumbent Donald Trump. The Supreme Court declined to hear the case on the basis that Texas lacked standing under Article III of the Constitution to challenge the results of an election held by another state.

Buck later became one of a group of seven Republicans who did not support their colleagues' efforts to challenge the results of the election on January 6, 2021. These seven signed a letter that, while giving credence to false election fraud allegations Trump made, said Congress did not have the authority to influence the election's outcome. In a 2021 interview with Kara Swisher of The New York Times, Buck distanced himself from Trump's false claims regarding the 2020 election.

After Liz Cheney was ousted as Republican Conference Chair for refusing to accept Trump's false claims of a stolen election, Buck likened her ouster to cancel culture, further stating that the decision would alienate voters who agreed with Cheney's stance.

After Trump was indicted for attempting to overturn the 2020 presidential election in Georgia, Buck distanced himself from comments made by fellow members of the House Freedom Caucus, which accused federal law enforcement of targeting Trump, saying that he trusted the process to take its course.

Prior to the first nomination election for the October 2023 Speaker of the House election, Buck asked the two Republican candidates, Steve Scalise and Jim Jordan, if the 2020 election was legitimate. Both Scalise and Jordan voted against certifying the results. Buck told reporters that they avoided answering his question. He thus voted "present" in the nomination election and later did not vote for Jordan in any of the votes of the full House. Buck would, however, vote for Mike Johnson, who voted against certifying the 2020 election and organized failed lawsuits to reverse the election results in key states. When asked about his about-face support of an election denier, Buck said Johnson's actions were mistakes, but they did not disqualify him from the speakership, and claimed Johnson's actions were not as significant as the moves Jordan took to overturn the election. Buck also stressed the need to elect a speaker and pass legislation once again.

=== Abortion ===
Buck opposes abortion, including in cases of rape and incest, but makes exceptions if the mother's life is in danger.

=== Antitrust ===
Buck favors bipartisan legislation designed to bolster the federal government's ability to bring antitrust cases against "Big Tech" companies. In 2021, he introduced the House version of the Open App Markets Act alongside Democrat Hank Johnson. Buck supports the proposed American Innovation and Choice Online Act.

In 2022, Buck was one of 39 Republicans to vote for the Merger Filing Fee Modernization Act of 2022, an antitrust package that would crack down on corporations for anti-competitive behavior. In 2023, Buck and Representative David Cicilline co-founded the Congressional Antitrust Caucus.

In 2022, Buck gave a speech on antitrust law and Big Tech at the National Conservatism Conference.

=== COVID-19 ===
Buck opposed many of Colorado's COVID-19 restrictions, including the closing of businesses. Of COVID-19 restrictions, he told The Denver Post, "we went like lambs to the slaughter. We can't allow that to happen again". Buck voted against the American Rescue Plan Act of 2021, calling it "funding for pet projects in Nancy Pelosi and Chuck Schumer's home states, money for Obamacare subsidies and Planned Parenthood, and stimulus checks for prisoners and illegal immigrants".

=== Education ===
Buck supports a revamp of the Department of Education and questions the department's constitutionality.

=== Environment ===
Buck rejects the scientific consensus on climate change. In an October 2010 meeting with supporters in Fort Collins, Colorado, he endorsed the views of Senator James Inhofe, saying, "Inhofe was the first person to stand up and say this global warming is the greatest hoax that has been perpetrated. The evidence just keeps supporting his view, and more and more people's view, of what's going on." According to a Buck spokesman, "Ken believes there is global warming but thinks the evidence points to it being natural rather than man-made."

=== Foreign policy ===
In 2020, Buck voted against the National Defense Authorization Act of 2021, which would prevent the president from withdrawing soldiers from Afghanistan without congressional approval.

In 2021, during a House vote on a measure condemning the Myanmar coup d'état that overwhelmingly passed, Buck was among 14 Republican representatives who voted against it, for reasons reported to be unclear.

In June 2021, Buck was one of 49 House Republicans to vote to repeal the Use of Military Force Authorization against Iraq.

In September 2021, Buck was among 75 House Republicans to vote against the National Defense Authorization Act of 2022, which contains a provision that would require women to be drafted.

Buck was among 19 House Republicans to vote against the final passage of the 2022 National Defense Authorization Act.

In 2023, Buck was among 47 Republicans to vote in favor of H.Con.Res. 21, which directed President Joe Biden to remove U.S. troops from Syria within 180 days.

Buck voted to provide Israel with support following 2023 Hamas attack on Israel.

Buck's last action as a congressman was to sign discharge petitions that would force votes on bills supplying military aid to Ukraine, Israel, and Taiwan.

=== Guns ===
Buck opposes gun control and is endorsed by Gun Owners of America. He has said he would "oppose any federal legislation to compile a database of gun owners or to further proscribe Americans' freedoms under the Second Amendment".

=== Healthcare ===
Buck opposes the health care reform laws enacted in 2010. He instead favors free market-based reforms. While running for Senate in 2010, Buck's campaign website stated, "We need to let the market work, make people responsible for their own insurance, and restore Americans' freedom to decide for themselves whether and how much insurance to buy." He supported a state constitutional amendment that would give rights to unborn fetuses, but then later withdrew his support reportedly after he found out that the measure would have restricted certain fertility and contraception procedures.

=== LGBT rights ===
Buck supported the U.S. military's "Don't ask, don't tell" policy. He said, "I do not support the repeal of don't ask don't tell. I think it is a policy that makes a lot of sense." Buck believes that being gay is a choice. He said, "I think birth has an influence over it, like alcoholism ... but I think that basically you have a choice." The Log Cabin Republicans have rebuked him for this comment. In 2015, Buck condemned the Supreme Court decision Obergefell v. Hodges, which held that same-sex marriage bans violate the constitution. On June 19, 2022, Buck voted against The Respect for Marriage Act, a bill that would protect the right to gay marriage at a federal level.

In 2021 Buck opposed the Equality Act, arguing that the legislation would force doctors to treat LGBT patients despite their religious objections, comparing it to forcing Jewish doctors to treat Nazi patients.

In 2023 Buck cosponsored the Protection of Women and Girls in Sports Act of 2023, which is a nationwide ban on transgender and intersex girls and women from participating in girls and women's sports.

=== Net neutrality ===
Buck signed his support for Ajit Pai's motion to abolish net neutrality, alongside 106 other Republican representatives. When asked about Pai's work to unravel net neutrality rules, Buck said: "I support Chairman Pai's efforts to free internet providers from burdensome regulations that stifle innovation and increase costs for Coloradans."

=== National security ===
During debate over the USA FREEDOM Reauthorization Act of 2020, Buck offered an amendment to the title of the bill so as to read: "A bill to be known as the Federal Initiative to Spy on Americans (FISA) Act." With only 35 votes in favor, the amendment was not adopted.

=== Veterans' health ===
Buck proposed privatizing Veterans Administration hospitals so they would "be better run". Three months later, he changed positions and his campaign said, "while Buck does indeed believe that private sector providers might do a better job than the VA in delivering health care to veterans, he is not in favor of fully privatizing health care for veterans."

=== Congressional prohibition on stock trading ===
The congressman supports a prohibition on members of Congress trading in stocks.

=== Fiscal Responsibility Act of 2023 ===
Buck was among the 71 Republicans who voted against final passage of the Fiscal Responsibility Act of 2023 in the House.

== Personal life ==
Both of Buck's marriages ended in divorce. Buck has two children from his first marriage to Dayna Roane. His son Cody (born 1988) is a 2011 graduate of the U.S. Military Academy at West Point, New York. Buck married his second wife, Perry, in 1996 and they announced their divorce on November 9, 2018, three days after the midterm election.

Buck is Protestant.

== Books ==
Buck's book Drain the Swamp: How Washington Corruption is Worse Than You Think was published in 2017. His book Crushed: Big Tech's War on Free Speech was published in 2023.

== Electoral history ==
United States Senate election in Colorado, 2010
Party	Candidate	Votes	%	±%
Democratic	Michael Bennet (incumbent)	854,685	48.08%	−3.22%
Republican	Ken Buck	824,789	46.40%	−0.13%
Green	Bob Kinsey	38,884	2.19%	N/A
Libertarian	Maclyn Stringer	22,646	1.27%	+0.79%
Independent	Jason Napolitano	19,450	1.09%	N/A
Independent	Charley Miller	11,351	0.64%	N/A
Independent	J. Moromisato	5,780	0.33%	N/A
Write-in		83	0.07%	N/A
Total votes		1,777,668	100.0%	
Democratic hold				

2014 United States House of Representatives elections
Party	Candidate	Votes	%
Republican	Ken Buck	185,292	65%
Democratic	Vic Meyers	83,727	29%
Libertarian	Jess Loban	9,472	3%
Independent	Grant Doherty	8,016	3%
Total votes		286,507	100%
Republican hold			

2016 United States House of Representatives elections
Party	Candidate	Votes	%
Republican	Ken Buck (incumbent)	248,230	63.5%
Democratic	Bob Seay	123,642	31.7%
Libertarian	Bruce Griffith	18,761	4.8%
Total votes		390,633	100%
Republican hold			

2018 United States House of Representatives elections
Party	Candidate	Votes	%
Republican	Ken Buck (incumbent)	224,038	60.61%
Democratic	Karen McCormick	145,544	39.38%
Write-in		38	0.01%
Total votes		369,620	100%
Republican hold			

2020 United States House of Representatives elections
Party	Candidate	Votes	%
Republican	Ken Buck (incumbent)	285,606	60.1%
Democratic	Ike McCorkle	173,945	36.6%
Libertarian	Bruce Griffith	11,026	2.3%
Unity	Laura Ireland	4,530	1.0%
Total votes		475,107	100%
Republican hold			

2022 United States House of Representatives elections
Party	Candidate	Votes	%
Republican	Ken Buck (incumbent)	216,024	60.9%
Democratic	Ike McCorkle	129,619	36.6%
American Constitution	Ryan McGonigal	8,870	2.5%
Total votes		354,513	100%
Republican hold			

Party political offices
Preceded by Pete Coors	Republican nominee for U.S. Senator from Colorado (Class 3); 2010	Succeeded by Darryl Glenn
Preceded by Jess Hays	Chair of the Colorado Republican Party; 2019–2021	Succeeded by Kristi Burton Brown
U.S. House of Representatives
Preceded by Cory Gardner	Member of the U.S. House of Representatives from Colorado's 4th congressional district 2015–2024	Succeeded by Greg Lopez
U.S. order of precedence (ceremonial)
Preceded by Ken Kramer as Former U.S. Representative	Order of precedence of the United States as Former U.S. Representative	Succeeded by Denny Heck as Former U.S. Representative
