= Open App Markets Act =

Proposed antitrust bill in the US Congress

- Long title: A bill to promote competition and reduce gatekeeper power in the app economy, increase choice, improve quality, and reduce costs for consumers.
- Announced in: the 117th United States Congress
- Number of co-sponsors: 10

Legislative history
- Introduced in the Senate as S. 2710 by Richard Blumenthal (D–CT) on August 8, 2021; Committee consideration by United States Senate Committee on the Judiciary

The Open App Markets Act (OAMA) is a proposed antitrust bill in the United States Congress. The Senate version of the legislation, S.2710, was introduced on August 11, 2021, by Richard Blumenthal (D-CT), Amy Klobuchar (D-MN) and Marsha Blackburn (R-TN). On August 13, 2021, a companion bill in the House of Representatives was introduced by Hank Johnson (D-GA) and Ken Buck (R-CO).

The legislation aims to prevent Apple and Google, operators of the App Store and Google Play, respectively, from engaging in what supporters of the legislation deem anti-competitive practices in app markets. The Open App Markets Act is intended to protect the ability to sideload apps and prevent operators of app marketplaces from "self-preferencing" their own products. On February 3, 2022, the Senate Judiciary Committee advanced the legislation in a 20–2 bipartisan vote.

The bill never came up for a vote after passing through the Senate Judiciary Committee. A modified version of the bill was reintroduced in June 2025.

== Background ==
Both Apple and Google have received national and international scrutiny regarding their operation of their in-house app marketplaces. In Epic Games v. Apple (2020), developer Epic Games sued Apple for restricting applications on its App Store from featuring other in-app purchasing methods. Epic Games founder Tim Sweeney had criticized Apple for taking a 30% revenue cut from purchases made in the App Store.

In July 2021, a group of 36 states and the District of Columbia filed a lawsuit against Google, alleging that the company abuses its market power through Google Play. In August 2021, the National Assembly of South Korea voted to amend the country's telecommunications law to ban Apple and Google from requiring developers to use their in-house payment systems.

== Provisions ==
The legislation applies to companies with 50 million users in the United States that operate app marketplaces. Provisions of the legislation include:

- A prohibition on requiring that app developers use the company's in-app payment system
- Prohibiting the so-called "self-preferencing" of apps, where app marketplace operators advantage their own products at the expense of other developers
- Requiring that app market operators allow for the download of third-party applications
- Preventing app developers from being penalized for selling apps on a separate app marketplace at a lower price

== Support and opposition ==
=== Support ===
As of June 13, 2022, the Senate version of the legislation, introduced by Blumenthal, has been co-sponsored by eleven senators. The House companion bill introduced by Johnson, H.R.5017, has seven co-sponsors. Ahead of the Senate Judiciary Committee vote, the Open App Markets Act received support from the CEOs of 20 tech companies, including Spotify. A poll conducted by the Coalition for App Fairness (CAF) found that 84% of app developers surveyed supported the legislation.

The American Economic Liberties Project (AELP), an anti-monopoly organization, urged lawmakers to pass the legislation. Tennessee Republican Marsha Blackburn, a co-sponsor of the legislation, argued that the legislation would "take power away from Big Tech and give it to the free market". Tom Ridge and Janet Napolitano, who served as Secretary of Homeland Security in the Bush and Obama administrations, respectively, have endorsed the legislation on security grounds.

In January 2022, a coalition of Chinese human rights activists and advocacy organizations wrote to the Senate Judiciary Committee in support of the legislation. Signatories to the legislation include Yang Jianli, a former Tiananmen Square activist, the Uyghur Human Rights Project (UHRP), and Tibetan rights groups. The activists argued that:

"If we were allowed to provide apps outside of the censored App Store, also known as sideloading, we would be able finally offer Chinese communities with tools to defeat the Great Firewall, such as Ultrasurf, Psiphon, and FreeGate."

=== Opposition ===
Both Apple and Google publicly opposed the legislation, with Google vice president Mark Isakowitz arguing the bill would "destroy many consumer benefits that current payment systems provide and distort competition by exempting gaming platforms, which amounts to Congress trying to artificially pick winners and losers in a highly competitive marketplace.” Apple CEO Tim Cook has criticized the legislation, arguing it would harm user security.

The Chamber of Progress, a tech industry trade group, criticized the bill on user security grounds, arguing that the sideloading provisions of the legislation posed a threat to consumers. Despite voting to advance the legislation in the committee, California Democrat Dianne Feinstein expressed concern that the legislation would disproportionately impact Apple and Google, both of which are headquartered in her state.

== Legislative history ==
Congress	Short title	Bill number(s)	Date introduced	Sponsor(s)	# of cosponsors	Latest status
117th Congress	Open App Markets Act.	H.R.5017	July 13, 2021	Hank Johnson (D-GA)	7	Referred to Committees of Jurisdiction.
117th Congress	Open App Markets Act.	H.R.7030	March 9, 2021	Hank Johnson (D-GA)	20	Referred to Committees of Jurisdiction.
117th Congress	Open App Markets Act.	S.2710	July 11, 2021	Richard Blumenthal (D-CT)	14	Referred to Committees of Jurisdiction.

=== Procedural history ===
On February 3, 2022, the Senate Judiciary Committee voted to advance the legislation in a 20–2 bipartisan vote, with only Republicans John Cornyn (R-TX) and Thom Tillis (R-NC) voting in opposition. The bill never came up for a vote after passing through the Senate Judiciary Committee. A modified version of the bill was reintroduced in June 2025.

== See also ==
- American Innovation and Choice Online Act
- State Antitrust Enforcement Venue Act of 2021
- United States antitrust law
- Epic Games v. Apple
