= American Innovation and Choice Online Act =

Proposed American antitrust bill

- Long title: To provide that certain discriminatory conduct by covered platforms shall be unlawful, and for other purposes.
- Announced in: the 117th United States Congress
- Number of co-sponsors: 45

Legislative history
- Introduced in the House of Representatives as H.R. 3816 by David Cicilline (D–RI) on June 11, 2021; Committee consideration by United States House Committee on the Judiciary

The American Innovation and Choice Online (AICO) is a proposed antitrust bill in the United States Congress. The legislation was introduced by David Cicilline (D-RI) in the House of Representatives as the American Choice and Innovation Online Act (H.R. 3816) on June 11, 2021. On October 14, 2021, companion legislation in the Senate was introduced by Amy Klobuchar (D-MN) and Chuck Grassley (R-IA) as S.2992.

The legislation aims to prevent Big Tech companies from "self-preferencing" their own products at the expense of competitors. Under AICO, covered platforms would be forbidden from disadvantaging other companies' products or services. The legislation would also prohibit covered platforms from using non-public data collected from business users to unfairly advantage the platforms' own products.

On June 24, 2021, the House Committee on the Judiciary advanced H.R. 3816 on a 24–20 vote. On January 20, 2022, the Senate Committee on the Judiciary voted to advance the legislation in a 16–6 vote.

== Background ==
Following a sixteen-month investigation, the House Committee on the Judiciary released a 450-page report in 2020 alleging that Big Tech companies have engaged in anti-competitive conduct.

According to Cicilline, both AICO and five accompanying pieces of antitrust legislation approved by the House Committee on the Judiciary in June 2021 were borne out of the report's findings.

== Provisions ==
The legislation is a bipartisan attempt to promote fair competition on the Internet by implementing new rules to prevent large tech companies from "abusing their market power to harm competition, online businesses, and consumers," according to a statement by Sens. Klobuchar and Grassley.

Under the House legislation (H.R. 3816), AICO would forbid covered platforms from:

- "Self-preferencing" their own products at the expense of competitors
- Intentionally disadvantaging other firms' products or services
- Using non-public data generated by a business user to advantage the covered platform's own products
- Interfering with pricing decisions set by another business user

The legislation would also prohibit covered platforms from retaliating against a business user that notifies law enforcement about the activities of covered platforms. If passed, the Federal Trade Commission (FTC) and the Department of Justice (DOJ) would be responsible for determining which platforms are "covered platforms" subject to AICO, and would be tasked with enforcement of the law.

=== Penalties ===
H.R. 3816 specifies penalties for covered platforms that violate AICO. Failure to comply with the law would result in fining the offending platform up to 15% of their U.S. revenue in the prior calendar year or up to 30% of their U.S. revenue for any one line of business harmed by their actions. Violation of AICO would additionally result in restitution as well as disgorgement.

=== Companies affected ===
If enacted, only companies with 50 million or more monthly users in the U.S. and a market capitalization of at least $600 billion would be governed by the provisions of AICO. According to reporting by Axios, AICO would prevent Apple and Google's Android from setting "prices and policies for their app stores that rivals have complained make them lose business and revenue". The legislation also aims to prevent Amazon from "self-preferencing" their own products at the expense of those sold by third parties.

=== Impact on cybersecurity ===
According to Richard Stiennon, the chief research analyst at cybersecurity company IT-Harvest, AICO would not prevent covered platforms from investing in cybersecurity measures. Stiennon noted that Google would be able to block phishing efforts on Gmail, and would similarly be permitted to continue scanning apps submitted to its Google Play store.

== Legislative history ==
As of September 28, 2022

Congress	Short title	Bill number(s)	Date introduced	Sponsor(s)	# of cosponsors	Latest status
117th Congress	American Innovation and Choice Online Act.	H.R.3816	June 11, 2021	David Cicilline (D-RI)	47	Referred to Committees of Jurisdiction.
117th Congress	American Innovation and Choice Online Act.	S.2992	October 18, 2021	Amy Klobuchar (D-MN)	13	Referred to Committees of Jurisdiction.
118th Congress	American Innovation and Choice Online Act	S.2033	June 15, 2023	Amy Klobuchar (D-MN)	8	Referred to Committees of Jurisdiction.

=== House of Representatives ===
H.R. 3816 was introduced by Cicilline on June 11, 2021, with fellow Democrat Jerry Nadler (D-NY) and Republicans Ken Buck (R-CO) and Lance Gooden (R-TX) as original cosponsors. On June 24, 2021, the House Committee on the Judiciary voted to advance the legislation in a 24–20 vote. The legislation has not received a floor vote in the full House of Representatives.

=== Senate ===
S.2992 was introduced as a companion bill to H.R. 3816 by Klobuchar and Grassley on October 14, 2021. On January 20, 2022, the Senate Committee on the Judiciary voted in favor of advancing the legislation in a 16–6 bipartisan vote. The industry fought against the bill with "an aggressive lobbying blitz" according to the Washington Post.

== See also ==
- Open App Markets Act
- State Antitrust Enforcement Venue Act of 2021
- United States antitrust law
