= State Antitrust Enforcement Venue Act of 2021 =

- Long title: To amend title 28 of the United States Code to prevent the transfer of actions arising under the antitrust laws in which a State is a complainant.
- Announced in: the 117th United States Congress
- Number of co-sponsors: 39

Legislative history
- Introduced in the House of Representatives as H.R. 3460 by Ken Buck (R–CO) on May 21, 2021; Committee consideration by United States House Committee on the Judiciary

The State Antitrust Enforcement Venue Act of 2021 is an antitrust bill in the United States Congress. The legislation was introduced in the House of Representatives by Ken Buck (R-CO) as H.R. 3460 on May 21, 2021. Companion legislation was introduced in the Senate by Mike Lee (R-UT) as S. 1787 on May 24, 2021.

The legislation would prevent antitrust lawsuits filed by multiple state attorneys general (state AGs) from being consolidated or transferred to a separate venue at the request of a company. Proponents of the bill argue that the current law helps companies accused of anti-competitive conduct by allowing suits to be consolidated or transferred in a more favorable venue at their request.

On June 14, 2022, the Senate passed the legislation by voice vote. The act was later consolidated into the 2022 omnibus spending bill and signed into law on Dec. 29th 2022.

== History ==
The legislation was introduced days after Google filed to transfer an antitrust suit from the Texas Attorney General's office and fourteen other state AGs to its home court in San Francisco, California.

In June 2021, a bipartisan coalition of 52 state AGs wrote a letter to Congress in support of the legislation. Lina Khan, chair of the Federal Trade Commission (FTC), urged members of the Senate to support the legislation in February 2022. Buck, who introduced the legislation in the House of Representatives, argued that states "should have the same benefit that is already afforded to federal antitrust enforcers — to select and remain in their preferred venue".

== Provisions ==
The legislation would allow antitrust lawsuits filed by state attorneys general to remain in their original court district, rather than be transferred or consolidated elsewhere. With the exception of suits filed by a federal agencies, antitrust lawsuits filed in multiple federal court districts can be consolidated in a single venue at a litigant's request.

If passed, the State Antitrust Enforcement Venue Act of 2021 would create a carve-out for state AGs from the Judicial Panel on Multidistrict Litigation (JPML) akin to the relevant exemption for federal agencies.

== Voting history ==
In June 2021, the House Judiciary Committee in favor of advancing H.R. 3460 to the House floor by a 34–7 margin. On September 23, 2021, the Senate Judiciary Committee voted to advance the legislation to a full vote in the Senate by voice vote.

On June 14, 2022, the Senate passed the legislation unanimously. Buck, who introduced the House version of the bill, praised the Senate's vote, describing it marking "the beginning of a new era of antitrust reform and proof-of-concept for a bipartisan reform coalition of conservatives and progressives".

== Legislative history ==
Congress	Short title	Bill number(s)	Date introduced	Sponsor(s)	# of cosponsors	Latest status
117th Congress	State Antitrust Enforcement Venue Act of 2021	H.R.3460	May 21, 2021	Ken Buck(R-CO)	40	Referred to committees of Jurisdiction.
117th Congress	State Antitrust Enforcement Venue Act of 2021	S.1787	May 24, 2021	Mike Lee(R-UT)	5	Passed the Senate.

== See also ==
- American Innovation and Choice Online Act
- Open App Markets Act
- United States antitrust law
