= List of acts of the 118th United States Congress =

The 118th United States Congress, which began on January 3, 2023, and ended on January 3, 2025, has enacted 274 public laws and zero private laws.

In contrast with previous Congresses, which generally enacted their first laws no later than January or February, the 118th Congress's first law was enacted on March 20. It has been called one of the least productive Congresses since 1951, being compared to the 113th Congress or the 92nd Congress.

== Public laws ==
The 118th Congress has enacted the following laws: (commemorative legislation is marked in blue)

Public law number	Date of enactment	Official short title(s)	Official title	Link to GPO
118-1	Mar 20, 2023	(No short title)	Disapproving the action of the District of Columbia Council in approving the Revised Criminal Code Act of 2022.	Pub. L. 118–1 (text) (PDF), H.J.Res. 26, 137 Stat. 3
118-2	Mar 20, 2023	COVID–19 Origin Act of 2023	To require the Director of National Intelligence to declassify information relating to the origin of COVID–19, and for other purposes.	Pub. L. 118–2 (text) (PDF), S. 619, 137 Stat. 4
118-3	Apr 10, 2023	(No short title)	Relating to a national emergency declared by the President on March 13, 2020.	Pub. L. 118–3 (text) (PDF), H.J.Res. 7, 137 Stat. 6
118-4	June 3, 2023	NOTAM Improvement Act of 2023	To establish a task force on improvements for notices to air missions, and for other purposes.	Pub. L. 118–4 (text) (PDF), H.R. 346, 137 Stat. 7
118-5	June 3, 2023	Fiscal Responsibility Act of 2023	To provide for a responsible increase to the debt ceiling.	Pub. L. 118–5 (text) (PDF), H.R. 3746, 137 Stat. 10
118-6	June 14, 2023	Veterans’ Compensation Cost-of-Living Adjustment Act of 2023 (Veterans’ COLA Act of 2023)	To increase, effective as of December 1, 2023, the rates of compensation for veterans with service-connected disabilities and the rates of dependency and indemnity compensation for the survivors of certain disabled veterans, and for other purposes.	Pub. L. 118–6 (text) (PDF), S. 777, 137 Stat. 50
118-7	June 30, 2023	Changing Age-Determined Eligibility To Student Incentive Payments Act (CADETS Act)	To modify the age requirement for the Student Incentive Payment Program of the State maritime academies.	Pub. L. 118–7 (text) (PDF), S. 467, 137 Stat. 52
118-8	July 18, 2023	Fiscal Year 2023 Veterans Affairs Major Medical Facility Authorization Act	To authorize major medical facility projects for the Department of Veterans Affairs for fiscal year 2023, and for other purposes.	Pub. L. 118–8 (text) (PDF), S. 30, 137 Stat. 53
118-9	July 25, 2023	Providing Accountability Through Transparency Act of 2023	To require each agency, in providing notice of a rulemaking, to include a link to a 100-word plain language summary of the proposed rule.	Pub. L. 118–9 (text) (PDF), S. 111, 137 Stat. 55
118-10	July 26, 2023	250th Anniversary of the United States Marine Corps Commemorative Coin Act	To require the Secretary of the Treasury to mint coins in commemoration of the 250th Anniversary of the United States Marine Corps, and to support programs at the Marine Corps Heritage Center.	Pub. L. 118–10 (text) (PDF), H.R. 1096, 137 Stat. 56
118-11	July 28, 2023	Pala Band of Mission Indians Land Transfer Act of 2023	To take certain land located in San Diego County, California, into trust for the benefit of the Pala Band of Mission Indians, and for other purposes.	Pub. L. 118–11 (text) (PDF), H.R. 423, 137 Stat. 60
118-12	July 28, 2023	(No short title)	To designate the clinic of the Department of Veterans Affairs in Indian River, Michigan, as the "Pfc. Justin T. Paton Department of Veterans Affairs Clinic".	Pub. L. 118–12 (text) (PDF), H.R. 3672, 137 Stat. 62
118-13	Aug 7, 2023	United States-Taiwan Initiative on 21st-Century Trade First Agreement Implementation Act	To approve and implement the Agreement between the American Institute in Taiwan and the Taipei Economic and Cultural Representative Office in the United States regarding Trade between the United States of America and Taiwan, and for other purposes.	Pub. L. 118–13 (text) (PDF), H.R. 4004, 137 Stat. 63
118-14	Sep 22, 2023	Securing the U.S. Organ Procurement and Transplantation Network Act	To improve the Organ Procurement and Transplantation Network, and for other purposes.	Pub. L. 118–14 (text) (PDF), H.R. 2544, 137 Stat. 69
118-15	Sep 30, 2023	Continuing Appropriations Act, 2024 and Other Extensions Act	Making continuing appropriations for fiscal year 2024, and for other purposes.	Pub. L. 118–15 (text) (PDF), H.R. 5860, 137 Stat. 71
118-16	Oct 2, 2023	(No short title)	To designate the clinic of the Department of Veterans Affairs in Gallup, New Mexico, as the Hiroshi "Hershey" Miyamura VA Clinic.	Pub. L. 118–16 (text) (PDF), S. 475, 137 Stat. 100
118-17	Oct 6, 2023	Protecting Hunting Heritage and Education Act	To amend the Elementary and Secondary Education Act of 1965 to clarify that the prohibition on the use of Federal education funds for certain weapons does not apply to the use of such weapons for training in archery, hunting, or other shooting sports.	Pub. L. 118–17 (text) (PDF), H.R. 5110, 137 Stat. 102
118-18	Oct 6, 2023	(No short title)	To amend title 38, United States Code, to strengthen benefits for children of Vietnam veterans born with spina bifida, and for other purposes.	Pub. L. 118–18 (text) (PDF), S. 112, 137 Stat. 103
118-19	Oct 6, 2023	(No short title)	To amend title 38, United States Code, to extend and modify certain authorities and requirements relating to the Department of Veterans Affairs, and for other purposes.	Pub. L. 118–19 (text) (PDF), S. 2795, 137 Stat. 106
118-20	Nov 13, 2023	Korean American Vietnam Allies Long Overdue for Relief Act (Korean American VALOR Act)	To amend title 38, United States Code, to treat certain individuals who served in Vietnam as a member of the armed forces of the Republic of Korea as a veteran of the Armed Forces of the United States for purposes of the provision of health care by the Department of Veterans Affairs.	Pub. L. 118–20 (text) (PDF), H.R. 366, 137 Stat. 108
118-21	Nov 13, 2023	Wounded Warrior Access Act	To amend title 38, United States Code, to allow for the electronic request of certain records, and for other purposes.	Pub. L. 118–21 (text) (PDF), H.R. 1226, 137 Stat. 109
118-22	Nov 17, 2023	Further Continuing Appropriations and Other Extensions Act, 2024	Making further continuing appropriations for fiscal year 2024, and for other purposes.	Pub. L. 118–22 (text) (PDF), H.R. 6363, 137 Stat. 112
118-23	Dec 19, 2023	Testing, Rapid Analysis, and Narcotic Quality Research Act of 2023 (TRANQ Research Act of 2023)	To require coordinated National Institute of Standards and Technology science and research activities regarding illicit drugs containing xylazine, novel synthetic opioids, and other substances of concern, and for other purposes.	Pub. L. 118–23 (text) (PDF), H.R. 1734, 137 Stat. 125
118-24	Dec 19, 2023	National Guard and Reservists Debt Relief Extension Act of 2023	To exempt for an additional 4-year period, from the application of the means-test presumption of abuse under chapter 7, qualifying members of reserve components of the Armed Forces and members of the National Guard who, after September 11, 2001, are called to active duty or to perform a homeland defense activity for not less than 90 days.	Pub. L. 118–24 (text) (PDF), H.R. 3315, 137 Stat. 128
118-25	Dec 19, 2023	Duck Stamp Modernization Act of 2023	To amend the Permanent Electronic Duck Stamp Act of 2013 to allow States to issue fully electronic stamps under that Act, and for other purposes.	Pub. L. 118–25 (text) (PDF), S. 788, 137 Stat. 129
118-26	Dec 19, 2023	(No short title)	To amend the Federal Election Campaign Act of 1971 to extend the Administrative Fine Program for certain reporting violations.	Pub. L. 118–26 (text) (PDF), S. 2747, 137 Stat. 131
118-27	Dec 19, 2023	5G Spectrum Authority Licensing Enforcement Act (5G SALE Act)	To authorize the Federal Communications Commission to process applications for spectrum licenses from applicants who were successful bidders in an auction before the authority of the Commission to conduct auctions expired on March 9, 2023.	Pub. L. 118–27 (text) (PDF), S. 2787, 137 Stat. 132
118-28	Dec. 21, 2023	(No short title)	Providing for the reappointment of Michael Govan as a citizen regent of the Board of Regents of the Smithsonian Institution.	Pub. L. 118–28 (text) (PDF), H.J.Res. 62, 137 Stat. 133
118-29	Dec. 21, 2023	(No short title)	Providing for the appointment of Antoinette Bush as a citizen regent of the Board of Regents of the Smithsonian Institution.	Pub. L. 118–29 (text) (PDF), H.J.Res. 63, 137 Stat. 134
118-30	Dec. 21, 2023	(No short title)	Providing for the reappointment of Roger W. Ferguson as a citizen regent of the Board of Regents of the Smithsonian Institution.	Pub. L. 118–30 (text) (PDF), H.J.Res. 64, 137 Stat. 135
118-31	Dec 22, 2023	National Defense Authorization Act for Fiscal Year 2024	To authorize appropriations for fiscal year 2024 for military activities of the Department of Defense and for military construction, and for defense activities of the Department of Energy, to prescribe military personnel strengths for such fiscal year, and for other purposes.	Pub. L. 118–31 (text) (PDF), H.R. 2670, 137 Stat. 136
118-32	Dec 26, 2023	Grand Ronde Reservation Act Amendment of 2023	To amend the Grand Ronde Reservation Act, and for other purposes.	Pub. L. 118–32 (text) (PDF), H.R. 1722, 137 Stat. 1109
118-33	Dec 26, 2023	(No short title)	To amend the Siletz Reservation Act to address the hunting, fishing, trapping, and animal gathering rights of the Confederated Tribes of Siletz Indians, and for other purposes.	Pub. L. 118–33 (text) (PDF), H.R. 2839, 137 Stat. 1110
118-34	Dec 26, 2023	Airport and Airway Extension Act of 2023, Part II	To amend title 49, United States Code, to extend authorizations for the airport improvement program, to amend the Internal Revenue Code of 1986 to extend the funding and expenditure authority of the Airport and Airway Trust Fund, and for other purposes.	Pub. L. 118–34 (text) (PDF), H.R. 6503, 137 Stat. 1112
118-35	Jan 19, 2024	Further Additional Continuing Appropriations and Other Extensions Act, 2024	Making further continuing appropriations for the fiscal year ending September 30, 2024, and for other purposes.	Pub. L. 118–35 (text) (PDF), H.R. 2872, 138 Stat. 3
118-36	Jan 26, 2024	(No short title)	To ensure the security of office space rented by Senators, and for other purposes.	Pub. L. 118–36 (text) (PDF), S. 3222, 138 Stat. 9
118-37	Jan 26, 2024	(No short title)	To provide remote access to court proceedings for victims of the 1988 Bombing of Pan Am Flight 103 over Lockerbie, Scotland.	Pub. L. 118–37 (text) (PDF), S. 3250, 138 Stat. 11
118-38	Feb 6, 2024	Overtime Pay for Protective Services Act of 2023	To extend the authority to provide employees of the United States Secret Service with overtime pay beyond other statutory limitations, and for other purposes.	Pub. L. 118–38 (text) (PDF), S. 3427, 138 Stat. 13
118-39	Feb 9, 2024	Moving Americans Privacy Protection Act	To amend the Tariff Act of 1930 to protect personally identifiable information, and for other purposes.	Pub. L. 118–39 (text) (PDF), H.R. 1568, 138 Stat. 16
118-40	Mar 1, 2024	Extension of Continuing Appropriations and Other Matters Act, 2024	Making further continuing appropriations for fiscal year 2024, and for other purposes.	Pub. L. 118–40 (text) (PDF), H.R. 7463, 138 Stat. 17
118-41	Mar 8, 2024	Airport and Airway Extension Act of 2024	To amend title 49, United States Code, to extend authorizations for the airport improvement program, to amend the Internal Revenue Code of 1986 to extend the funding and expenditure authority of the Airport and Airway Trust Fund, and for other purposes.	Pub. L. 118–41 (text) (PDF), H.R. 7454, 138 Stat. 20
118-42	Mar 9, 2024	Consolidated Appropriations Act, 2024	Making consolidated appropriations for the fiscal year ending September 30, 2024, and for other purposes.	Pub. L. 118–42 (text) (PDF), H.R. 4366, 138 Stat. 25
118-43	Mar 18, 2024	Eradicating Narcotic Drugs and Formulating Effective New Tools to Address National Yearly Losses of life Act (END FENTANYL Act)	To require the Commissioner of U.S. Customs and Border Protection to regularly review and update policies and manuals related to inspections at ports of entry.	Pub. L. 118–43 (text) (PDF), S. 206, 138 Stat. 453
118-44	Mar 18, 2024	Disaster Assistance Deadlines Alignment Act	To amend the Robert T. Stafford Disaster Relief and Emergency Assistance Act to establish a deadline for applying for disaster unemployment assistance.	Pub. L. 118–44 (text) (PDF), S. 1858, 138 Stat. 455
118-45	Mar 22, 2024	I–27 Numbering Act of 2023	To amend the Intermodal Surface Transportation Efficiency Act of 1991 to designate the Texas and New Mexico portions of the future Interstate-designated segments of the Ports-to-Plains Corridor as Interstate Route 27, and for other purposes.	Pub. L. 118–45 (text) (PDF), S. 992, 138 Stat. 457
118-46	Mar 22, 2024	(No short title)	To designate the Federal building located at 985 Michigan Avenue in Detroit, Michigan, as the "Rosa Parks Federal Building", and for other purposes.	Pub. L. 118–46 (text) (PDF), S. 1278, 138 Stat. 459
118-47	Mar 23, 2024	Further Consolidated Appropriations Act, 2024	Making further consolidated appropriations for the fiscal year ending September 30, 2024, and for other purposes.	Pub. L. 118–47 (text) (PDF), H.R. 2882, 138 Stat. 460
118-48	Apr 19, 2024	Puyallup Tribe of Indians Land Into Trust Confirmation Act of 2023	To take certain land in the State of Washington into trust for the benefit of the Puyallup Tribe of the Puyallup Reservation, and for other purposes.	Pub. L. 118–48 (text) (PDF), S. 382, 138 Stat. 860
118-49	Apr 20, 2024	Reforming Intelligence and Securing America Act	To reform the Foreign Intelligence Surveillance Act of 1978.	Pub. L. 118–49 (text) (PDF), H.R. 7888, 138 Stat. 862
118-50	Apr 24, 2024	(No short title)	Making emergency supplemental appropriations for the fiscal year ending September 30, 2024, and for other purposes.	Pub. L. 118–50 (text) (PDF), H.R. 815, 138 Stat. 895
118-51	Apr 24, 2024	Migratory Birds of the Americas Conservation Enhancements Act of 2023	To amend the Neotropical Migratory Bird Conservation Act to make improvements to that Act, and for other purposes.	Pub. L. 118–51 (text) (PDF), H.R. 4389, 138 Stat. 1005
118-52	May 7, 2024	(No short title)	To designate the facility of the United States Postal Service located at 24355 Creekside Road in Santa Clarita, California, as the "William L. Reynolds Post Office Building".	Pub. L. 118–52 (text) (PDF), H.R. 292, 138 Stat. 1007
118-53	May 7, 2024	(No short title)	To designate the facility of the United States Postal Service located at 3901 MacArthur Blvd., in New Orleans, Louisiana, as the "Dr. Rudy Lombard Post Office".	Pub. L. 118–53 (text) (PDF), H.R. 996, 138 Stat. 1008
118-54	May 7, 2024	(No short title)	To designate the facility of the United States Postal Service located at 616 East Main Street in St. Charles, Illinois, as the "Veterans of the Vietnam War Memorial Post Office".	Pub. L. 118–54 (text) (PDF), H.R. 2379, 138 Stat. 1009
118-55	May 7, 2024	(No short title)	To designate the facility of the United States Postal Service located at 2395 East Del Mar Boulevard in Laredo, Texas, as the "Lance Corporal David Lee Espinoza, Lance Corporal Juan Rodrigo Rodriguez & Sergeant Roberto Arizola Jr. Post Office Building".	Pub. L. 118–55 (text) (PDF), H.R. 2754, 138 Stat. 1010
118-56	May 7, 2024	(No short title)	To designate the facility of the United States Postal Service located at 101 South 8th Street in Lebanon, Pennsylvania, as the "Lieutenant William D. Lebo Post Office Building".	Pub. L. 118–56 (text) (PDF), H.R. 3865, 138 Stat. 1011
118-57	May 7, 2024	(No short title)	To designate the facility of the United States Postal Service located at 120 West Church Street in Mount Vernon, Georgia, as the "Second Lieutenant Patrick Palmer Calhoun Post Office".	Pub. L. 118–57 (text) (PDF), H.R. 3944, 138 Stat. 1012
118-58	May 7, 2024	(No short title)	To designate the facility of the United States Postal Service located at 859 North State Road 21 in Melrose, Florida, as the "Pamela Jane Rock Post Office Building".	Pub. L. 118–58 (text) (PDF), H.R. 3947, 138 Stat. 1013
118-59	May 7, 2024	Revising Existing Procedures On Reporting via Technology Act (REPORT Act)	To amend title 18, United States Code, to strengthen reporting to the CyberTipline related to online sexual exploitation of children, to modernize liabilities for such reports, to preserve the contents of such reports for 1 year, and for other purposes.	Pub. L. 118–59 (text) (PDF), S. 474, 138 Stat. 1014
118-60	May 10, 2024	Airport and Airway Extension Act of 2024, Part II	To extend authorizations for the airport improvement program, to extend the funding and expenditure authority of the Airport and Airway Trust Fund, and for other purposes.	Pub. L. 118–60 (text) (PDF), H.R. 8289, 138 Stat. 1018
118-61	May 13, 2024	(No short title)	To rename the Department of Veterans Affairs community-based outpatient clinic in Hinesville, Georgia, as the "John Gibson, Dan James, William Sapp, and Frankie Smiley VA Clinic".	Pub. L. 118–61 (text) (PDF), H.R. 593, 138 Stat. 1021
118-62	May 13, 2024	Prohibiting Russian Uranium Imports Act	To prohibit the importation into the United States of unirradiated low-enriched uranium that is produced in the Russian Federation, and for other purposes.	Pub. L. 118–62 (text) (PDF), H.R. 1042, 138 Stat. 1022
118-63	May 16, 2024	FAA Reauthorization Act of 2024	To amend title 49, United States Code, to reauthorize and improve the Federal Aviation Administration and other civil aviation programs, and for other purposes.	Pub. L. 118–63 (text) (PDF), H.R. 3935, 138 Stat. 1025
118-64	May 24, 2024	Recruit and Retain Act	To amend the Omnibus Crime Control and Safe Streets Act of 1968 to authorize law enforcement agencies to use COPS grants for recruitment activities, and for other purposes.	Pub. L. 118–64 (text) (PDF), S. 546, 138 Stat. 1435
118-65	June 17, 2024	Missing Children's Assistance Reauthorization Act of 2023	To reauthorize the Missing Children’s Assistance Act, and for other purposes.	Pub. L. 118–65 (text) (PDF), S. 2051, 138 Stat. 1439
118-66	July 2, 2024	Dr. Emmanuel Bilirakis and Honorable Jennifer Wexton National Plan to End Parkinson's Act	To direct the Secretary of Health and Human Services to carry out a national project to prevent, diagnose, treat, and cure Parkinson’s, to be known as the National Parkinson’s Project, and for other purposes.	Pub. L. 118–66 (text) (PDF), H.R. 2365, 138 Stat. 1443
118-67	July 9, 2024	Fire Grants and Safety Act of 2023	To authorize appropriations for the United States Fire Administration and firefighter assistance grant programs, to advance the benefits of nuclear energy, and for other purposes.	Pub. L. 118–67 (text) (PDF), S. 870, 138 Stat. 1447
118-68	July 12, 2024	Winnebago Land Transfer Act of 2023	To transfer administrative jurisdiction of certain Federal lands from the Army Corps of Engineers to the Bureau of Indian Affairs, to take such lands into trust for the Winnebago Tribe of Nebraska, and for other purposes.	Pub. L. 118–68 (text) (PDF), H.R. 1240, 138 Stat. 1483
118-69	July 12, 2024	Maternal and Child Health Stillbirth Prevention Act of 2024	To amend title V of the Social Security Act to support stillbirth prevention and research, and for other purposes.	Pub. L. 118–69 (text) (PDF), H.R. 4581, 138 Stat. 1485
118-70	July 12, 2024	Promoting a Resolution to the Tibet-China Dispute Act	To amend the Tibetan Policy Act of 2002 to modify certain provisions of that Act.	Pub. L. 118–70 (text) (PDF), S. 138, 138 Stat. 1487
118-71	July 25, 2024	Federal Prison Oversight Act	To establish an inspections regime for the Bureau of Prisons, and for other purposes.	Pub. L. 118–71 (text) (PDF), H.R. 3019, 138 Stat. 1492
118-72	July 30, 2024	Debbie Smith Act of 2023	To amend the DNA Analysis Backlog Elimination Act of 2000 to reauthorize the Debbie Smith DNA Backlog Grant Program, and for other purposes.	Pub. L. 118–72 (text) (PDF), H.R. 1105, 138 Stat. 1503
118-73	July 30, 2024	Improving Access to Our Courts Act	To amend title 28, United States Code, to provide an additional place for holding court for the Pecos Division of the Western District of Texas, and for other purposes.	Pub. L. 118–73 (text) (PDF), S. 227, 138 Stat. 1504
118-74	July 30, 2024	All-American Flag Act	To require the purchase of domestically made flags of the United States of America for use by the Federal Government.	Pub. L. 118–74 (text) (PDF), S. 1973, 138 Stat. 1505
118-75	July 30, 2024	(No short title)	To designate the outpatient clinic of the Department of Veterans Affairs in Wyandotte County, Kansas City, Kansas, as the "Captain Elwin Shopteese VA Clinic".	Pub. L. 118–75 (text) (PDF), S. 3249, 138 Stat. 1507
118-76	July 30, 2024	(No short title)	To rename the community-based outpatient clinic of the Department of Veterans Affairs in Butte, Montana, as the "Charlie Dowd VA Clinic".	Pub. L. 118–76 (text) (PDF), S. 3285, 138 Stat. 1508
118-77	July 30, 2024	Victims’ Voices Outside and Inside the Courtroom Effectiveness Act (Victims’ VOICES Act)	To amend section 3663A of title 18, United States Code, to clarify that restitution includes necessary and reasonable expenses incurred by a person who has assumed the victim's rights.	Pub. L. 118–77 (text) (PDF), S. 3706, 138 Stat. 1510
118-78	July 30, 2024	Foreign Extortion Prevention Technical Corrections Act	To make a technical correction to the National Defense Authorization Act for Fiscal Year 2024 by repealing section 5101 and enacting an updated version of the Foreign Extortion Prevention Act.	Pub. L. 118–78 (text) (PDF), S. 4548, 138 Stat. 1512
118-79	Sep 13, 2024	Preventing the Financing of Illegal Synthetic Drugs Act	To require the Comptroller General of the United States to carry out a study on the trafficking into the United States of synthetic drugs, and related illicit finance, and for other purposes.	Pub. L. 118–79 (text) (PDF), H.R. 1076, 138 Stat. 1515
118-80	Sep 13, 2024	Starr–Camargo Bridge Expansion Act	To provide for the expansion of the Starr–Camargo Bridge near Rio Grande City, Texas, and for other purposes.	Pub. L. 118–80 (text) (PDF), S. 1608, 138 Stat. 1518
118-81	Sep 20, 2024	Royalty Resiliency Act	To amend the Federal Oil and Gas Royalty Management Act of 1982 to improve the management of royalties from oil and gas leases, and for other purposes.	Pub. L. 118–81 (text) (PDF), H.R. 7377, 138 Stat. 1520
118-82	Sep 20, 2024	Veterans Benefits Continuity and Accountability Supplemental Appropriations Act, 2024	Making supplemental appropriations for the fiscal year ending September 30, 2024, and for other purposes.	Pub. L. 118–82 (text) (PDF), H.R. 9468, 138 Stat. 1521
118-83	Sep 26, 2024	Continuing Appropriations and Extensions Act, 2025	Making continuing appropriations and extensions for fiscal year 2025, and for other purposes.	Pub. L. 118–83 (text) (PDF), H.R. 9747, 138 Stat. 1524
118-84	Sep 26, 2024	Supporting and Improving Rural EMS Needs Reauthorization Act (SIREN Reauthorization Act)	To reauthorize the rural emergency medical service training and equipment assistance program, and for other purposes.	Pub. L. 118–84 (text) (PDF), S. 265, 138 Stat. 1544
118-85	Sep 26, 2024	Launch Communications Act	To facilitate access to the electromagnetic spectrum for commercial space launches and commercial space reentries, and for other purposes.	Pub. L. 118–85 (text) (PDF), S. 1648, 138 Stat. 1546
118-86	Sep 26, 2024	Poison Control Centers Reauthorization Act of 2024	To amend the Public Health Service Act to reauthorize certain poison control programs.	Pub. L. 118–86 (text) (PDF), S. 4351, 138 Stat. 1549
118-87	Sep 26, 2024	Dustoff Crews of the Vietnam War Congressional Gold Medal Act	To award a Congressional Gold Medal to the United States Army Dustoff crews of the Vietnam War, collectively, in recognition of their extraordinary heroism and life-saving actions in Vietnam.	Pub. L. 118–87 (text) (PDF), S. 2825, 138 Stat. 1550
118-88	Sep 26, 2024	Billie Jean King Congressional Gold Medal Act	To award a Congressional Gold Medal to Billie Jean King, an American icon, in recognition of a remarkable life devoted to championing equal rights for all, in sports and in society.	Pub. L. 118–88 (text) (PDF), S. 2861, 138 Stat. 1554
118-89	Sep 30, 2024	Congressional Budget Office Data Sharing Act	To amend the Congressional Budget and Impoundment Control Act of 1974 to provide the Congressional Budget Office with necessary authorities to expedite the sharing of data from executive branch agencies, and for other purposes.	Pub. L. 118–89 (text) (PDF), H.R. 7032, 138 Stat. 1557
118-90	Sep 30, 2024	United States Commission on International Religious Freedom Reauthorization Act of 2024	To extend and authorize annual appropriations for the United States Commission on International Religious Freedom through fiscal year 2026.	Pub. L. 118–90 (text) (PDF), S. 3764, 138 Stat. 1559
118-91	Oct 1, 2024	Enhanced Presidential Security Act of 2024	To direct the Director of the United States Secret Service to apply the same standards for determining the number of agents required to protect Presidents, Vice Presidents, and major Presidential and Vice Presidential candidates, and for other purposes.	Pub. L. 118–91 (text) (PDF), H.R. 9106, 138 Stat. 1560
118-92	Oct 1, 2024	NAPA Reauthorization Act	To extend the National Alzheimer's Project.	Pub. L. 118–92 (text) (PDF), S. 133, 138 Stat. 1562
118-93	Oct 1, 2024	Alzheimer's Accountability and Investment Act	To require an annual budget estimate for the initiatives of the National Institutes of Health pursuant to reports and recommendations made under the National Alzheimer's Project Act.	Pub. L. 118–93 (text) (PDF), S. 134, 138 Stat. 1565
118-94	Oct 1, 2024	Lake Tahoe Restoration Reauthorization Act	To reauthorize the Lake Tahoe Restoration Act, and for other purposes.	Pub. L. 118–94 (text) (PDF), S. 612, 138 Stat. 1566
118-95	Oct 1, 2024	Veteran Improvement Commercial Driver License Act of 2023	To amend title 38, United States Code, to revise the rules for approval by the Secretary of Veterans Affairs of commercial driver education programs for purposes of veterans educational assistance, and for other purposes.	Pub. L. 118–95 (text) (PDF), S. 656, 138 Stat. 1567
118-96	Oct 1, 2024	IMPACTT Human Trafficking Act	To improve services for trafficking victims by establishing, in Homeland Security Investigations, the Investigators Maintain Purposeful Awareness to Combat Trafficking Trauma Program and the Victim Assistance Program.	Pub. L. 118–96 (text) (PDF), S. 670, 138 Stat. 1569
118-97	Oct 1, 2024	GAO Database Modernization Act of 2023	To amend chapter 8 of title 5, United States Code, to require Federal agencies to submit to the Comptroller General of the United States a report on rules that are revoked, suspended, replaced, amended, or otherwise made ineffective.	Pub. L. 118–97 (text) (PDF), S. 679, 138 Stat. 1573
118-98	Oct 1, 2024	Customs Trade Partnership Against Terrorism Pilot Program Act of 2023 (CTPAT Pilot Program Act of 2023)	To require a pilot program on the participation of non-asset-based third-party logistics providers in the Customs-Trade Partnership Against Terrorism.	Pub. L. 118–98 (text) (PDF), S. 794, 138 Stat. 1575
118-99	Oct 1, 2024	Reuse Excess Property Act	To make data and internal guidance on excess personal property publicly available, and for other purposes.	Pub. L. 118–99 (text) (PDF), S. 2685, 138 Stat. 1578
118-100	Oct 1, 2024	(No short title)	To designate the facility of the United States Postal Service located at 2075 West Stadium Boulevard in Ann Arbor, Michigan, as the "Robert Hayden Post Office".	Pub. L. 118–100 (text) (PDF), S. 3639, 138 Stat. 1581
118-101	Oct 1, 2024	(No short title)	To designate the facility of the United States Postal Service located at 155 South Main Street in Mount Clemens, Michigan, as the "Lieutenant Colonel Alexander Jefferson Post Office".	Pub. L. 118–101 (text) (PDF), S. 3640, 138 Stat. 1582
118-102	Oct 1, 2024	(No short title)	To designate the facility of the United States Postal Service located at 90 McCamly Street South in Battle Creek, Michigan, as the "Sojourner Truth Post Office".	Pub. L. 118–102 (text) (PDF), S. 3851, 138 Stat. 1583
118-103	Oct 1, 2024	DHS Joint Task Forces Reauthorization Act of 2024	To authorize the Joint Task Forces of the Department of Homeland Security, and for other purposes.	Pub. L. 118–103 (text) (PDF), S. 4698, 138 Stat. 1584
118-104	Oct 2, 2024	Congressional Budget Office Data Access Act	To provide the Congressional Budget Office with necessary authorities to expedite the sharing of data from executive branch agencies, and for other purposes.	Pub. L. 118–104 (text) (PDF), S. 1549, 138 Stat. 1586
118-105	Oct 2, 2024	Building Chips in America Act of 2023	To amend the William M. (Mac) Thornberry National Defense Authorization Act for Fiscal Year 2021 to clarify the scope of a major Federal action under the National Environmental Policy Act of 1969 with respect to certain projects relating to the production of semiconductors, and for other purposes.	Pub. L. 118–105 (text) (PDF), S. 2228, 138 Stat. 1587
118-106	Oct 4, 2024	Confirmation Of Congressional Observer Access Act of 2024 (COCOA Act of 2024)	To amend the Help America Vote Act of 2002 to confirm the requirement that States allow access to designated congressional election observers to observe the election administration procedures in congressional elections.	Pub. L. 118–106 (text) (PDF), H.R. 6513, 138 Stat. 1591
118-107	Nov 21, 2024	Congenital Heart Futures Reauthorization Act of 2024	To amend the Public Health Service Act to reauthorize a national congenital heart disease research, surveillance, and awareness program, and for other purposes.	Pub. L. 118–107 (text) (PDF), H.R. 7189, 138 Stat. 1594
118-108	Nov 25, 2024	(No short title)	To designate the facility of the United States Postal Service located at 3500 West 6th Street, Suite 103 in Los Angeles, California, as the "Dosan Ahn Chang Ho Post Office".	Pub. L. 118–108 (text) (PDF), H.R. 599, 138 Stat. 1596
118-109	Nov 25, 2024	Working Dog Commemorative Coin Act	To require the Secretary of the Treasury to mint coins in commemoration of the invaluable service that working dogs provide to society.	Pub. L. 118–109 (text) (PDF), H.R. 807, 138 Stat. 1597
118-110	Nov 25, 2024	(No short title)	To designate the facility of the United States Postal Service located at 1663 East Date Place in San Bernardino, California, as the "Dr. Margaret B. Hill Post Office Building".	Pub. L. 118–110 (text) (PDF), H.R. 1060, 138 Stat. 1601
118-111	Nov 25, 2024	(No short title)	To designate the facility of the United States Postal Service located at 50 East Derry Road in East Derry, New Hampshire, as the "Chief Edward B. Garone Post Office".	Pub. L. 118–111 (text) (PDF), H.R. 1098, 138 Stat. 1602
118-112	Nov 25, 2024	(No short title)	To designate the facility of the United States Postal Service located at 28081 Marguerite Parkway in Mission Viejo, California, as the "Major Megan McClung Post Office Building".	Pub. L. 118–112 (text) (PDF), H.R. 3608, 138 Stat. 1603
118-113	Nov 25, 2024	(No short title)	To designate the facility of the United States Postal Service located at 25 Dorchester Avenue, Room 1, in Boston, Massachusetts, as the "Caroline Chang Post Office".	Pub. L. 118–113 (text) (PDF), H.R. 3728, 138 Stat. 1604
118-114	Nov 25, 2024	Restoring Benefits to Defrauded Veterans Act	To amend title 38, United States Code, to direct the Secretary of Veterans Affairs to repay the estates of deceased beneficiaries for certain benefits paid by the Secretary and misused by fiduciaries of such beneficiaries.	Pub. L. 118–114 (text) (PDF), H.R. 4190, 138 Stat. 1605
118-115	Nov 25, 2024	(No short title)	To name the Department of Veterans Affairs community-based outpatient clinic in Guntersville, Alabama, as the "Colonel Ola Lee Mize Department of Veterans Affairs Clinic".	Pub. L. 118–115 (text) (PDF), H.R. 5464, 138 Stat. 1606
118-116	Nov 25, 2024	(No short title)	To designate the facility of the United States Postal Service located at 1077 River Road, Suite 1, in Washington Crossing, Pennsylvania, as the "Susan C. Barnhart Post Office".	Pub. L. 118–116 (text) (PDF), H.R. 5476, 138 Stat. 1607
118-117	Nov 25, 2024	Bolstering Ecosystems Against Coastal Harm Act (BEACH Act)	To amend the Coastal Barrier Resources Act to expand the John H. Chafee Coastal Barrier Resources System, and for other purposes.	Pub. L. 118–117 (text) (PDF), H.R. 5490, 138 Stat. 1608
118-118	Nov 25, 2024	(No short title)	To designate the facility of the United States Postal Service located at 12804 Chillicothe Road in Chesterland, Ohio, as the "Sgt. Wolfgang Kyle Weninger Post Office Building".	Pub. L. 118–118 (text) (PDF), H.R. 5640, 138 Stat. 1624
118-119	Nov 25, 2024	(No short title)	To designate the facility of the United States Postal Service located at 220 Fremont Street in Kiel, Wisconsin, as the "Trooper Trevor J. Casper Post Office Building".	Pub. L. 118–119 (text) (PDF), H.R. 5712, 138 Stat. 1625
118-120	Nov 25, 2024	Building on Reemployment Improvements to Deliver Good Employment for Workers Act (BRIDGE for Workers Act)	To extend reemployment services and eligibility assessments to all claimants for unemployment benefits, and for other purposes.	Pub. L. 118–120 (text) (PDF), H.R. 5861, 138 Stat. 1626
118-121	Nov 25, 2024	(No short title)	To designate the facility of the United States Postal Service located at 517 Seagaze Drive in Oceanside, California, as the "Charlesetta Reece Allen Post Office Building".	Pub. L. 118–121 (text) (PDF), H.R. 5985, 138 Stat. 1627
118-122	Nov 25, 2024	(No short title)	To designate the facility of the United States Postal Service located at 9925 Bustleton Avenue in Philadelphia, Pennsylvania, as the "Sergeant Christopher David Fitzgerald Post Office Building".	Pub. L. 118–122 (text) (PDF), H.R. 6073, 138 Stat. 1628
118-123	Nov 25, 2024	Think Differently About Emergencies Act	To provide for a review and report on the assistance and resources that the Administrator of the Federal Emergency Management Agency provides to individuals with disabilities and the families of such individuals that are impacted by major disasters, and for other purposes.	Pub. L. 118–123 (text) (PDF), H.R. 6249, 138 Stat. 1629
118-124	Nov 25, 2024	Fiscal Year 2024 Veterans Affairs Major Medical Facility Authorization Act	To authorize major medical facility projects for the Department of Veterans Affairs for fiscal year 2024, and for other purposes.	Pub. L. 118–124 (text) (PDF), H.R. 6324, 138 Stat. 1632
118-125	Nov 25, 2024	(No short title)	To designate the facility of the United States Postal Service located at 603 West 3rd Street in Necedah, Wisconsin, as the "Sergeant Kenneth E. Murphy Post Office Building".	Pub. L. 118–125 (text) (PDF), H.R. 6651, 138 Stat. 1634
118-126	Nov 25, 2024	(No short title)	To designate the facility of the United States Postal Service located at 333 West Broadway in Anaheim, California, as the Dr. "William I. 'Bill' Kott Post Office Building".	Pub. L. 118–126 (text) (PDF), H.R. 7192, 138 Stat. 1635
118-127	Nov 25, 2024	(No short title)	To designate the facility of the United States Postal Service located at S74w16860 Janesville Road, in Muskego, Wisconsin, as the "Colonel Hans Christian Heg Post Office".	Pub. L. 118–127 (text) (PDF), H.R. 7199, 138 Stat. 1636
118-128	Nov 25, 2024	(No short title)	To name the Department of Veterans Affairs medical center in West Palm Beach, Florida, as the "Thomas H. Corey VA Medical Center".	Pub. L. 118–128 (text) (PDF), H.R. 7333, 138 Stat. 1637
118-129	Nov 25, 2024	(No short title)	To designate the facility of the United States Postal Service located at 103 Benedette Street in Rayville, Louisiana, as the "Luke Letlow Post Office Building".	Pub. L. 118–129 (text) (PDF), H.R. 7423, 138 Stat. 1638
118-130	Nov 25, 2024	Veterans' Compensation Cost-of-Living Adjustment Act of 2024	To increase, effective as of December 1, 2024, the rates of compensation for veterans with service-connected disabilities and the rates of dependency and indemnity compensation for the survivors of certain disabled veterans, and for other purposes.	Pub. L. 118–130 (text) (PDF), H.R. 7777, 138 Stat. 1639
118-131	Nov 25, 2024	GAO Inspector General Parity Act	To amend provisions relating to the Office of the Inspector General of the Government Accountability Office, and for other purposes.	Pub. L. 118–131 (text) (PDF), S. 1510, 138 Stat. 1641
118-132	Nov 25, 2024	(No short title)	To designate the facility of the United States Postal Service located at 320 South 2nd Avenue in Sioux Falls, South Dakota, as the "Staff Sergeant Robb Lura Rolfing Post Office Building".	Pub. L. 118–132 (text) (PDF), S. 2143, 138 Stat. 1644
118-133	Nov 25, 2024	(No short title)	To designate the facility of the United States Postal Service located at 112 Wyoming Street in Shoshoni, Wyoming, as the "Dessie A. Bebout Post Office".	Pub. L. 118–133 (text) (PDF), S. 2274, 138 Stat. 1645
118-134	Nov 25, 2024	Mark Our Place Act	To amend title 38, United States Code, to authorize the Secretary of Veterans Affairs to furnish or replace a headstone, marker, or medallion for the grave of an eligible Medal of Honor recipient regardless of the recipient's dates of service in the Armed Forces, and for other purposes.	Pub. L. 118–134 (text) (PDF), S. 3126, 138 Stat. 1646
118-135	Nov 25, 2024	(No short title)	To designate the facility of the United States Postal Service located at 410 Dakota Avenue South in Huron, South Dakota, as the "First Lieutenant Thomas Michael Martin Post Office Building".	Pub. L. 118–135 (text) (PDF), S. 3267, 138 Stat. 1647
118-136	Nov 25, 2024	(No short title)	To designate the facility of the United States Postal Service located at 1765 Camp Hill Bypass in Camp Hill, Pennsylvania, as the "John Charles Traub Post Office".	Pub. L. 118–136 (text) (PDF), S. 3419, 138 Stat. 1648
118-137	Dec 1, 2024	No Stolen Trademarks Honored in America Act of 2023	To modify the prohibition on recognition by United States courts of certain rights relating to certain marks, trade names, or commercial names.	Pub. L. 118–137 (text) (PDF), H.R. 1505, 138 Stat. 1649
118-138	Dec 11, 2024	Coastal Habitat Conservation Act of 2023	To authorize the Secretary of the Interior, through the Coastal Program of the United States Fish and Wildlife Service, to work with willing partners and provide support to efforts to assess, protect, restore, and enhance important coastal landscapes that provide fish and wildlife habitat on which certain Federal trust species depend, and for other purposes.	Pub. L. 118–138 (text) (PDF), H.R. 2950, 138 Stat. 1651
118-139	Dec 11, 2024	Michel O. Maceda Memorial Act	To designate the Air and Marine Operations Marine Unit of the U.S. Customs and Border Protection located at 101 Km 18.5 in Cabo Rojo, Puerto Rico, as the "Michel O. Maceda Marine Unit".	Pub. L. 118–139 (text) (PDF), H.R. 5302, 138 Stat. 1655
118-140	Dec 11, 2024	Grant Transparency Act of 2023	To require transparency in notices of funding opportunity, and for other purposes.	Pub. L. 118–140 (text) (PDF), H.R. 5536, 138 Stat. 1657
118-141	Dec 11, 2024	James R. Dominguez Memorial Act of 2023	To designate the checkpoint of the United States Border Patrol located on United States Highway 90 West in Uvalde County, Texas, as the "James R. Dominguez Border Patrol Checkpoint".	Pub. L. 118–141 (text) (PDF), H.R. 5799, 138 Stat. 1660
118-142	Dec 11, 2024	BOLD Infrastructure for Alzheimer's Reauthorization Act of 2024	To amend title III of the Public Health Service Act to extend the program for promotion of public health knowledge and awareness of Alzheimer's disease and related dementias, and for other purposes.	Pub. L. 118–142 (text) (PDF), H.R. 7218, 138 Stat. 1662
118-143	Dec 11, 2024	FIFA World Cup 2026 Commemorative Coin Act	To require the Secretary of the Treasury to mint coins in commemoration of the FIFA World Cup 2026, and for other purposes.	Pub. L. 118–143 (text) (PDF), H.R. 7438, 138 Stat. 1663
118-144	Dec 11, 2024	Commission to Study the Potential Transfer of the Weitzman National Museum of American Jewish History to the Smithsonian Institution Act	To establish a commission to study the potential transfer of the Weitzman National Museum of American Jewish History to the Smithsonian Institution, and for other purposes.	Pub. L. 118–144 (text) (PDF), H.R. 7764, 138 Stat. 1667
118-145	Dec 11, 2024	FAFSA Deadline Act	To establish an earlier application processing cycle for the FAFSA.	Pub. L. 118–145 (text) (PDF), H.R. 8932, 138 Stat. 1671
118-146	Dec 12, 2024	VSO Equal Tax Treatment Act (VETT Act)	To amend the Internal Revenue Code of 1986 to provide for the deductibility of charitable contributions to certain organizations for members of the Armed Forces.	Pub. L. 118–146 (text) (PDF), H.R. 1432, 138 Stat. 1673
118-147	Dec 12, 2024	Firefighter Cancer Registry Reauthorization Act of 2023	To reauthorize the Firefighter Cancer Registry Act of 2018.	Pub. L. 118–147 (text) (PDF), H.R. 3821, 138 Stat. 1674
118-148	Dec 12, 2024	Federal Disaster Tax Relief Act of 2023	To provide tax relief with respect to certain Federal disasters.	Pub. L. 118–148 (text) (PDF), H.R. 5863, 138 Stat. 1675
118-149	Dec 12, 2024	Forgotten Heroes of the Holocaust Congressional Gold Medal Act	To award a Congressional Gold Medal collectively to 60 diplomats, in recognition of their bravery and heroism during the Holocaust.	Pub. L. 118–149 (text) (PDF), S. 91, 138 Stat. 1678
118-150	Dec 12, 2024	Shirley Chisholm Congressional Gold Medal Act	To award posthumously the Congressional Gold Medal to Shirley Chisholm.	Pub. L. 118–150 (text) (PDF), S. 4243, 138 Stat. 1682
118-151	Dec 17, 2024	(No short title)	To amend title 35, United States Code, to provide a good faith exception to the imposition of fines for false assertions and certifications, and for other purposes.	Pub. L. 118–151 (text) (PDF), S. 3960, 138 Stat. 1685
118-152	Dec 17, 2024	Pensacola and Perdido Bays Estuary of National Significance Act of 2024	To amend the Federal Water Pollution Control Act to require the Administrator of the Environmental Protection Agency to give priority consideration to selecting Pensacola and Perdido Bays as an estuary of national significance, and for other purposes.	Pub. L. 118–152 (text) (PDF), S. 50, 138 Stat. 1686
118-153	Dec 17, 2024	Disaster Contract Improvement Act	To establish an advisory group to encourage and foster collaborative efforts among individuals and entities engaged in disaster recovery relating to debris removal, and for other purposes.	Pub. L. 118–153 (text) (PDF), S. 310, 138 Stat. 1688
118-154	Dec 17, 2024	(No short title)	To designate United States Route 20 in the States of Oregon, Idaho, Montana, Wyoming, Nebraska, Iowa, Illinois, Indiana, Ohio, Pennsylvania, New York, and Massachusetts as the "National Medal of Honor Highway", and for other purposes.	Pub. L. 118–154 (text) (PDF), S. 1478, 138 Stat. 1691
118-155	Dec 17, 2024	Good Samaritan Remediation of Abandoned Hardrock Mines Act of 2024	To promote remediation of abandoned hardrock mines, and for other purposes.	Pub. L. 118–155 (text) (PDF), S. 2781, 138 Stat. 1692
118-156	Dec 17, 2024	Strengthening the Commercial Driver’s License Information System Act	A bill to amend title 49, United States Code, to allow the Secretary of Transportation to designate an authorized operator of the commercial driver's license information system, and for other purposes.	Pub. L. 118–156 (text) (PDF), S. 3475, 138 Stat. 1716
118-157	Dec 17, 2024	Improving Federal Building Security Act of 2024	A bill to require Facility Security Committees to respond to security recommendations issued by the Federal Protective Service relating to facility security, and for other purposes.	Pub. L. 118–157 (text) (PDF), S. 3613, 138 Stat. 1719
118-158	Dec 21, 2024	American Relief Act, 2025	Making further continuing appropriations for the fiscal year ending September 30, 2025, and for other purposes.	Pub. L. 118–158 (text) (PDF), H.R. 10545, 138 Stat. 1722
118-159	Dec 23, 2024	Servicemember Quality of Life Improvement and National Defense Authorization Act for Fiscal Year 2025	To authorize appropriations for fiscal year 2025 for military activities of the Department of Defense, for military construction, and for defense activities of the Department of Energy, to prescribe military personnel strengths for such fiscal year, and for other purposes.	Pub. L. 118–159 (text) (PDF), H.R. 5009, 138 Stat. 1773
118-160	Dec 23, 2024	Native American Child Protection Act	To amend the Indian Child Protection and Family Violence Prevention Act.	Pub. L. 118–160 (text) (PDF), H.R. 663, 138 Stat. 2567
118-161	Dec 23, 2024	Everett Alvarez, Jr. Congressional Gold Medal Act of 2023	To award a Congressional Gold Medal to Everett Alvarez, Jr., in recognition of his service to the Nation.	Pub. L. 118–161 (text) (PDF), H.R. 1097, 138 Stat. 2572
118-162	Dec 23, 2024	(No short title)	To clarify jurisdiction with respect to certain Bureau of Reclamation pumped storage development, and for other purposes.	Pub. L. 118–162 (text) (PDF), H.R. 1607, 138 Stat. 2575
118-163	Dec 23, 2024	Chesapeake and Ohio Canal National Historical Park Commission Extension Act	To amend the Chesapeake and Ohio Canal Development Act to extend the Chesapeake and Ohio Canal National Historical Park Commission.	Pub. L. 118–163 (text) (PDF), H.R. 1727, 138 Stat. 2578
118-164	Dec 23, 2024	Mountain View Corridor Completion Act	To require the Department of the Interior to convey to the State of Utah certain Federal land under the administrative jurisdiction of the Bureau of Land Management within the boundaries of Camp Williams, Utah, and for other purposes.	Pub. L. 118–164 (text) (PDF), H.R. 2468, 138 Stat. 2579
118-165	Dec 23, 2024	First Responder Access to Innovative Technologies Act	To amend the Homeland Security Act of 2002 to establish a process to review applications for certain grants to purchase equipment or systems that do not meet or exceed any applicable national voluntary consensus standards, and for other purposes.	Pub. L. 118–165 (text) (PDF), H.R. 3254, 138 Stat. 2581
118-166	Dec 23, 2024	(No short title)	To extend the authority to collect Shasta-Trinity Marina fees through fiscal year 2029.	Pub. L. 118–166 (text) (PDF), H.R. 3324, 138 Stat. 2583
118-167	Dec 23, 2024	Paperwork Burden Reduction Act	To amend the Internal Revenue Code of 1986 to provide an alternative manner of furnishing certain health insurance coverage statements to individuals.	Pub. L. 118–167 (text) (PDF), H.R. 3797, 138 Stat. 2584
118-168	Dec 23, 2024	Employer Reporting Improvement Act	To amend the Internal Revenue Code of 1986 to streamline and improve the employer reporting process relating to health insurance coverage and to protect dependent privacy.	Pub. L. 118–168 (text) (PDF), H.R. 3801, 138 Stat. 2586
118-169	Dec 23, 2024	Great Salt Lake Stewardship Act	To amend the Central Utah Project Completion Act to authorize expenditures for the conduct of certain water conservation measures in the Great Salt Lake basin, and for other purposes.	Pub. L. 118–169 (text) (PDF), H.R. 4094, 138 Stat. 2588
118-170	Dec 23, 2024	Drought Preparedness Act	To extend authorization of the Reclamation States Emergency Drought Relief Act of 1991.	Pub. L. 118–170 (text) (PDF), H.R. 4385, 138 Stat. 2589
118-171	Dec 23, 2024	DHS Border Services Contracts Review Act	To direct the Under Secretary for Management of the Department of Homeland Security to assess contracts for covered services performed by contractor personnel along the United States land border with Mexico, and for other purposes.	Pub. L. 118–171 (text) (PDF), H.R. 4467, 138 Stat. 2590
118-172	Dec 23, 2024	Eliminate Useless Reports Act of 2024	To amend title 31, United States Code, to require agencies to include a list of outdated or duplicative reporting requirements in annual budget justifications, and for other purposes.	Pub. L. 118–172 (text) (PDF), H.R. 5301, 138 Stat. 2593
118-173	Dec 23, 2024	Stop Campus Hazing Act	To amend the Higher Education Act of 1965 to require institutions of higher education to disclose hazing incidents, and for other purposes.	Pub. L. 118–173 (text) (PDF), H.R. 5646, 138 Stat. 2597
118-174	Dec 23, 2024	Water Monitoring and Tracking Essential Resources (WATER) Data Improvement Act	To reauthorize certain United States Geological Survey water data enhancement programs.	Pub. L. 118–174 (text) (PDF), H.R. 5770, 138 Stat. 2602
118-175	Dec 23, 2024	(No short title)	To designate the visitor and education center at Fort McHenry National Monument and Historic Shrine as the Paul S. Sarbanes Visitor and Education Center.	Pub. L. 118–175 (text) (PDF), H.R. 6826, 138 Stat. 2604
118-176	Dec 23, 2024	Cardiomyopathy Health Education, Awareness, and Research, and AED Training in the Schools Act of 2024 (HEARTS Act of 2024)	To amend the Public Health Service Act to authorize and support the creation and dissemination of cardiomyopathy education, awareness, and risk assessment materials and resources to identify more at-risk families, to authorize research and surveillance activities relating to cardiomyopathy, and for other purposes.	Pub. L. 118–176 (text) (PDF), H.R. 6829, 138 Stat. 2605
118-177	Dec 23, 2024	(No short title)	To expand the boundaries of the Atchafalaya National Heritage Area to include Lafourche Parish, Louisiana.	Pub. L. 118–177 (text) (PDF), H.R. 6843, 138 Stat. 2611
118-178	Dec 23, 2024	Emergency Medical Services for Children Reauthorization Act of 2024	To amend the Public Health Service Act to reauthorize the Emergency Medical Services for Children program.	Pub. L. 118–178 (text) (PDF), H.R. 6960, 138 Stat. 2612
118-179	Dec 23, 2024	(No short title)	To amend title 28, United States Code, to consolidate certain divisions in the Northern District of Alabama.	Pub. L. 118–179 (text) (PDF), H.R. 7177, 138 Stat. 2613
118-180	Dec 23, 2024	Autism Collaboration, Account ability, Research, Education, and Support Act of 2024 (Autism CARES Act of 2024)	To amend the Public Health Service Act to enhance and reauthorize activities and programs relating to autism spectrum disorder, and for other purposes.	Pub. L. 118–180 (text) (PDF), H.R. 7213, 138 Stat. 2614
118-181	Dec 23, 2024	Utah State Parks Adjustment Act	To require the Secretary of the Interior and the Secretary of Agriculture to convey certain Federal land to the State of Utah for inclusion in certain State parks, and for other purposes.	Pub. L. 118–181 (text) (PDF), H.R. 7332, 138 Stat. 2620
118-182	Dec 23, 2024	GSA Technology Accountability Act	To amend title 40, United States Code, to require the submission of reports on certain information technology services funds to Congress before expenditures may be made, and for other purposes.	Pub. L. 118–182 (text) (PDF), H.R. 7524, 138 Stat. 2623
118-183	Dec 23, 2024	Colorado River Salinity Control Fix Act	To amend the Colorado River Basin Salinity Control Act to modify certain requirements applicable to salinity control units, and for other purposes.	Pub. L. 118–183 (text) (PDF), H.R. 7872, 138 Stat. 2625
118-184	Dec 23, 2024	Lahaina National Heritage Area Study Act	To require the Secretary of the Interior to conduct a study to assess the suitability and feasibility of designating certain land as the Lahaina National Heritage Area, and for other purposes.	Pub. L. 118–184 (text) (PDF), H.R. 8219, 138 Stat. 2628
118-185	Dec 23, 2024	Swanson and Hugh Butler Reservoirs Land Conveyances Act	To provide for the conveyance of certain Federal land at Swanson Reservoir and Hugh Butler Reservoir in the State of Nebraska, and for other purposes.	Pub. L. 118–185 (text) (PDF), H.R. 8413, 138 Stat. 2629
118-186	Dec 23, 2024	Detection Equipment and Technology Evaluation to Counter the Threat of Fentanyl and Xylazine Act of 2024 (DETECT Fentanyl and Xylazine Act of 2024)	To require the Science and Technology Directorate in the Department of Homeland Security to develop greater capacity to detect and identify illicit substances in very low concentrations.	Pub. L. 118–186 (text) (PDF), H.R. 8663, 138 Stat. 2636
118-187	Dec 23, 2024	Source code Harmonization And Reuse in Information Technology Act (SHARE IT Act)	To require governmentwide source code sharing, and for other purposes.	Pub. L. 118–187 (text) (PDF), H.R. 9566, 138 Stat. 2638
118-188	Dec 23, 2024	Chance to Compete Act of 2024	To implement merit-based reforms to the civil service hiring system that replace degree-based hiring with skills- and competency-based hiring.	Pub. L. 118–188 (text) (PDF), S. 59, 138 Stat. 2644
118-189	Dec 23, 2024	(No short title)	To amend the Controlled Substances Act to fix a technical error in the definitions.	Pub. L. 118–189 (text) (PDF), S. 223, 138 Stat. 2652
118-190	Dec 23, 2024	Federal Agency Performance Act of 2024	To improve performance and accountability in the Federal Government, and for other purposes.	Pub. L. 118–190 (text) (PDF), S. 709, 138 Stat. 2653
118-191	Dec 23, 2024	Beagle Brigade Act of 2023	To authorize the National Detector Dog Training Center, and for other purposes.	Pub. L. 118–191 (text) (PDF), S. 759, 138 Stat. 2658
118-192	Dec 23, 2024	No Congressionally Obligated Recurring Revenue Used as Pensions To Incarcerated Officials Now Act (No CORRUPTION Act)	To amend title 5, United States Code, to provide for the halt in pension payments for Members of Congress sentenced for certain offenses, and for other purposes.	Pub. L. 118–192 (text) (PDF), S. 932, 138 Stat. 2660
118-193	Dec 23, 2024	Jenna Quinn Law	To amend the Child Abuse Prevention and Treatment Act to provide for grants in support of training and education to teachers and other school employees, students, and the community about how to prevent, recognize, respond to, and report child sexual abuse among primary and secondary school students.	Pub. L. 118–193 (text) (PDF), S. 1147, 138 Stat. 2662
118-194	Dec 23, 2024	Stop Institutional Child Abuse Act	To study and prevent child abuse in youth residential programs, and for other purposes.	Pub. L. 118–194 (text) (PDF), S. 1351, 138 Stat. 2664
118-195	Dec 23, 2024	Working Dog Health and Welfare Act of 2023	To require agencies with working dog programs to implement the recommendations of the Government Accountability Office relating to the health and welfare of working dogs, and for other purposes.	Pub. L. 118–195 (text) (PDF), S. 2414, 138 Stat. 2669
118-196	Dec 23, 2024	Veterans Benefits Improvement Act of 2024	To amend title 38, United States Code, to improve benefits administered by the Secretary of Veterans Affairs, and for other purposes.	Pub. L. 118–196 (text) (PDF), S. 2513, 138 Stat. 2671
118-197	Dec 23, 2024	Never Again Education Reauthorization Act of 2023	To reauthorize the Director of the United States Holocaust Memorial Museum to support Holocaust education programs, and for other purposes.	Pub. L. 118–197 (text) (PDF), S. 3448, 138 Stat. 2677
118-198	Dec 23, 2024	America’s Conservation Enhancement Reauthorization Act of 2024	To reauthorize the America's Conservation Enhancement Act, and for other purposes.	Pub. L. 118–198 (text) (PDF), S. 3791, 138 Stat. 2678
118-199	Dec 23, 2024	Jamul Indian Village Land Transfer Act	To take certain land in the State of California into trust for the benefit of the Jamul Indian Village of California, and for other purposes.	Pub. L. 118–199 (text) (PDF), S. 3857, 138 Stat. 2684
118-200	Dec 23, 2024	(No short title)	To designate the community-based outpatient clinic of the Department of Veterans Affairs in Lynchburg, Virginia, as the "Private First Class Desmond T. Doss VA Clinic".	Pub. L. 118–200 (text) (PDF), S. 3938, 138 Stat. 2682
118-201	Dec 23, 2024	(No short title)	To designate the facility of the United States Postal Service located at 1106 Main Street in Bastrop, Texas, as the "Sergeant Major Billy D. Waugh Post Office".	Pub. L. 118–201 (text) (PDF), S. 3946, 138 Stat. 2687
118-202	Dec 23, 2024	Transportation Security Screening Modernization Act of 2024	To require the Transportation Security Administration to streamline the enrollment processes for individuals applying for a Transportation Security Administration security threat assessment for certain programs, including the Transportation Worker Identification Credential and Hazardous Materials Endorsement Threat Assessment programs of the Administration, and for other purposes.	Pub. L. 118–202 (text) (PDF), S. 3959, 138 Stat. 2688
118-203	Dec 23, 2024	Federal Judiciary Stabilization Act of 2024	To provide for the permanent appointment of certain temporary district judgeships.	Pub. L. 118–203 (text) (PDF), S. 3998, 138 Stat. 2693
118-204	Dec 23, 2024	(No short title)	To designate the facility of the United States Postal Service located at 180 Steuart Street in San Francisco, California, as the "Dianne Feinstein Post Office".	Pub. L. 118–204 (text) (PDF), S. 4077, 138 Stat. 2696
118-205	Dec 23, 2024	Think Differently Transportation Act	To require Amtrak to report to Congress information on Amtrak compliance with the Americans with Disabilities Act of 1990 with respect to trains and stations.	Pub. L. 118–205 (text) (PDF), S. 4107, 138 Stat. 2697
118-206	Dec 23, 2024	(No short title)	To amend title 36, United States Code, to designate the bald eagle as the national bird.	Pub. L. 118–206 (text) (PDF), S. 4610, 138 Stat. 2699
118-207	Dec 23, 2024	Financial Management Risk Reduction Act	To amend section 7504 of title 31, United States Code, to improve the single audit requirements.	Pub. L. 118–207 (text) (PDF), S. 4716, 138 Stat. 2701
118-208	Dec 23, 2024	(No short title)	To designate the medical center of the Department of Veterans Affairs in Tulsa, Oklahoma, as the "James Mountain Inhofe VA Medical Center".	Pub. L. 118–208 (text) (PDF), S. 5314, 138 Stat. 2704
118-209	Dec 23, 2024	National Advisory Council on Indian Education Improvement Act (NACIE Improvement Act)	To ensure that the National Advisory Council on Indian Education includes at least 1 member who is the president of a Tribal College or University.	Pub. L. 118–209 (text) (PDF), S. 5355, 138 Stat. 2705
118-210	Jan 2, 2025	Senator Elizabeth Dole 21st Century Veterans Healthcare and Benefits Improvement Act	To amend title 38, United States Code, to improve certain programs of the Department of Veterans Affairs for home and community based services for veterans, and for other purposes.	Pub. L. 118–210 (text) (PDF), S. 141, 138 Stat. 2706
118-211	Jan 2, 2025	(No short title)	To designate the facility of the United States Postal Service located at 2300 Sylvan Avenue in Modesto, California, as the "Corporal Michael D. Anderson Jr. Post Office Building".	Pub. L. 118–211 (text) (PDF), H.R. 1555, 138 Stat. 2802
118-212	Jan 2, 2025	(No short title)	To designate the facility of the United States Postal Service located at 207 East Fort Dade Avenue in Brooksville, Florida, as the "Specialist Justin Dean Coleman Memorial Post Office Building".	Pub. L. 118–212 (text) (PDF), H.R. 1823, 138 Stat. 2803
118-213	Jan 2, 2025	(No short title)	To designate the facility of the United States Postal Service located at 220 North Hatcher Avenue in Purcellville, Virginia, as the "Secretary of State Madeleine Albright Post Office Building".	Pub. L. 118–213 (text) (PDF), H.R. 3354, 138 Stat. 2804
118-214	Jan 2, 2025	U.S. Congressman Sam Johnson Memorial VA Clinic Act	To name the Department of Veterans Affairs community-based outpatient clinic in Plano, Texas, as the "U.S. Congressman Sam Johnson Memorial VA Clinic".	Pub. L. 118–214 (text) (PDF), H.R. 4136
118-215	Jan 2, 2025	(No short title)	To name the community-based outpatient clinic of the Department of Veterans Affairs in Monroeville, Pennsylvania, as the "Henry Parham VA Clinic".	Pub. L. 118–215 (text) (PDF), H.R. 4955, 138 Stat. 2806
118-216	Jan 2, 2025	(No short title)	To designate the facility of the United States Postal Service located at 109 Live Oaks Boulevard in Casselberry, Florida, as the "Colonel Joseph William Kittinger II Post Office Building".	Pub. L. 118–216 (text) (PDF), H.R. 5867, 138 Stat. 2808
118-217	Jan 2, 2025	(No short title)	To designate the facility of the United States Postal Service located at 14280 South Military Trail in Delray Beach, Florida, as the "Benjamin Berell Ferencz Post Office Building".	Pub. L. 118–217 (text) (PDF), H.R. 6116, 138 Stat. 2809
118-218	Jan 2, 2025	(No short title)	To designate the facility of the United States Postal Service located at 379 North Oates Street in Dothan, Alabama, as the "LaBruce 'Bruce' Tidwell Post Office Building".	Pub. L. 118–218 (text) (PDF), H.R. 6162, 138 Stat. 2810
118-219	Jan 2, 2025	(No short title)	To designate the facility of the United States Postal Service located at 420 Highway 17 North in Surfside Beach, South Carolina, as the "Nancy Yount Childs Post Office Building".	Pub. L. 118–219 (text) (PDF), H.R. 6188, 138 Stat. 2811
118-220	Jan 2, 2025	(No short title)	To designate the facility of the United States Postal Service located at 1535 East Los Ebanos Boulevard in Brownsville, Texas, as the "1st Lieutenant Andres Zermeno Post Office Building".	Pub. L. 118–220 (text) (PDF), H.R. 6244, 138 Stat. 2812
118-221	Jan 2, 2025	(No short title)	To designate the facility of the United States Postal Service located at 9355 113th Street in Seminole, Florida, as the "Army SSG Ryan Christian Knauss Memorial Post Office Building".	Pub. L. 118–221 (text) (PDF), H.R. 6633, 138 Stat. 2813
118-222	Jan 2, 2025	(No short title)	To designate the facility of the United States Postal Service located at 501 Mercer Street Southwest in Wilson, North Carolina, as the "Milton F. Fitch, Sr. Post Office Building".	Pub. L. 118–222 (text) (PDF), H.R. 6750, 138 Stat. 2814
118-223	Jan 2, 2025	(No short title)	To designate the facility of the United States Postal Service located at 518 North Ridgewood Drive in Sebring, Florida, as the "U.S. Army Air Corps Major Thomas B. McGuire Post Office Building".	Pub. L. 118–223 (text) (PDF), H.R. 6810, 138 Stat. 2815
118-224	Jan 2, 2025	(No short title)	To designate the facility of the United States Postal Service located at 15 South Valdosta Road in Lakeland, Georgia, as the "Nell Patten Roquemore Post Office".	Pub. L. 118–224 (text) (PDF), H.R. 6983, 138 Stat. 2816
118-225	Jan 4, 2025	Think Differently Database Act	To direct the Secretary of Health and Human Services to establish a website to promote awareness of available resources for individuals with disabilities, and for other purposes.	Pub. L. 118–225 (text) (PDF), H.R. 670, 138 Stat. 2817
118-226	Jan 4, 2025	Women’s Suffrage National Monument Location Act	To authorize the location of a monument on the National Mall to commemorate and honor the women’s suffrage movement and the passage of the 19th Amendment to the Constitution, and for other purposes.	Pub. L. 118–226 (text) (PDF), H.R. 1318, 138 Stat. 2819
118-227	Jan 4, 2025	Clifton Opportunities Now for Vibrant Economic Yields Act (CONVEY Act)	To direct the Secretary of the Interior to convey to Mesa County, Colorado, certain Federal land in Colorado, and for other purposes.	Pub. L. 118–227 (text) (PDF), H.R. 2997, 138 Stat. 2820
118-228	Jan 4, 2025	Gabriella Miller Kids First Research Act 2.0	To extend the Gabriella Miller Kids First Pediatric Research Program at the National Institutes of Health, and for other purposes.	Pub. L. 118–228 (text) (PDF), H.R. 3391, 138 Stat. 2822
118-229	Jan 4, 2025	Fishery Improvement to Streamline untimely regulatory Hurdles post Emergency Situation Act (FISHES Act)	To require the Director of the Office of Management and Budget to approve or deny spend plans within a certain amount of time, and for other purposes.	Pub. L. 118–229 (text) (PDF), H.R. 5103, 138 Stat. 2824
118-230	Jan 4, 2025	Accelerating Appraisals and Conservation Efforts Act (AACE Act)	To establish a policy regarding appraisal and valuation services for real property for a transaction over which the Secretary of the Interior has jurisdiction, and for other purposes.	Pub. L. 118–230 (text) (PDF), H.R. 5443, 138 Stat. 2826
118-231	Jan 4, 2025	Government Service Delivery Improvement Act	To amend chapter 3 of title 5, United States Code, to improve Government service delivery, and build related capacity for the Federal Government, and for other purposes.	Pub. L. 118–231 (text) (PDF), H.R. 5887, 138 Stat. 2829
118-232	Jan 4, 2025	(No short title)	To restore the ability of the people of American Samoa to approve amendments to the territorial constitution based on majority rule in a democratic act of self-determination, as authorized pursuant to an Act of Congress delegating administration of Federal territorial law in the territory to the President, and to the Secretary of the Interior under Executive Order 10264, dated June 29, 1951, under which the Constitution of American Samoa was approved and may be amended without requirement for further congressional action, subject to the authority of Congress under the Territorial Clause in article IV, section 3, clause 2 of the United States Constitution.	Pub. L. 118–232 (text) (PDF), H.R. 6062, 138 Stat. 2834
118-233	Jan 4, 2025	Recognizing the Importance of Critical Minerals in Healthcare Act of 2023	To amend the Energy Act of 2020 to require the Secretary of the Interior to include the Secretary of Health and Human Services in consultations regarding designations of critical minerals, elements, substances, and materials.	Pub. L. 118–233 (text) (PDF), H.R. 6395, 138 Stat. 2835
118-234	Jan 4, 2025	Expanding Public Lands Outdoor Recreation Experiences Act (EXPLORE Act)	To improve recreation opportunities on, and facilitate greater access to, Federal public land, and for other purposes.	Pub. L. 118–234 (text) (PDF), H.R. 6492, 138 Stat. 2836
118-235	Jan 4, 2025	Holcombe Rucker Park National Commemorative Site Act	To designate Holcombe Rucker Park, in Harlem, New York, as a National Commemorative Site, and for other purposes.	Pub. L. 118–235 (text) (PDF), H.R. 6852, 138 Stat. 2919
118-236	Jan 4, 2025	(No short title)	To designate the facility of the United States Postal Service located at 201 East Battles Road in Santa Maria, California, as the "Larry Lavagnino Post Office Building".	Pub. L. 118–236 (text) (PDF), H.R. 7158, 138 Stat. 2921
118-237	Jan 4, 2025	(No short title)	To designate the facility of the United States Postal Service located at 80 1st Street in Kingsland, Arkansas, as the "Kingsland 'Johnny Cash' Post Office".	Pub. L. 118–237 (text) (PDF), H.R. 7180, 138 Stat. 2922
118-238	Jan 4, 2025	Veterans Expedited TSA Screening Safe Travel Act (VETS Safe Travel Act)	To provide PreCheck to certain severely injured or disabled veterans, and for other purposes.	Pub. L. 118–238 (text) (PDF), H.R. 7365, 138 Stat. 2923
118-239	Jan 4, 2025	(No short title)	To designate the facility of the United States Postal Service located at 29 Franklin Street in Petersburg, Virginia, as the "John Mercer Langston Post Office Building".	Pub. L. 118–239 (text) (PDF), H.R. 7385, 138 Stat. 2926
118-240	Jan 4, 2025	(No short title)	To designate the facility of the United States Postal Service located at 135 West Spring Street in Titusville, Pennsylvania, as the "Edwin L. Drake Post Office Building".	Pub. L. 118–240 (text) (PDF), H.R. 7417, 138 Stat. 2927
118-241	Jan 4, 2025	(No short title)	To designate the facility of the United States Postal Service located at 203 East 6th Street in Lexington, Nebraska, as the "William E. and Elsie L. Barrett Post Office Building".	Pub. L. 118–241 (text) (PDF), H.R. 7507
118-242	Jan 4, 2025	(No short title)	To designate the facility of the United States Postal Service located at 1285 Emancipation Highway in Fredericksburg, Virginia, as the "Gladys P. Todd Post Office".	Pub. L. 118–242 (text) (PDF), H.R. 7508
118-243	Jan 4, 2025	(No short title)	To designate the facility of the United States Postal Service located at 1087 Route 47 South in Rio Grande, New Jersey, as the "Carlton H. Hand Post Office Building".	Pub. L. 118–243 (text) (PDF), H.R. 7606
118-244	Jan 4, 2025	(No short title)	To designate the facility of the United States Postal Service located at Block 1025, Lots 18 & 19, Northeast Corner of US Route 9 South and Main Street in the Township of Middle, County of Cape May, New Jersey, as the "George Henry White Post Office Building".	Pub. L. 118–244 (text) (PDF), H.R. 7607
118-245	Jan 4, 2025	(No short title)	To designate the facility of the United States Postal Service located at 306 Pickens Street in Marion, Alabama, as the "Albert Turner, Sr. Post Office Building".	Pub. L. 118–245 (text) (PDF), H.R. 7893
118-246	Jan 4, 2025	Klamath Basin Water Agreement Support Act of 2024	To amend the Klamath Basin Water Supply Enhancement Act of 2000 to provide the Secretary of the Interior with certain authorities with respect to projects affecting the Klamath Basin watershed, and for other purposes.	Pub. L. 118–246 (text) (PDF), H.R. 7938
118-247	Jan 4, 2025	Jackie Robinson Ballpark National Commemorative Site Act	To establish the Jackie Robinson Ballpark National Commemorative Site in the State of Florida, and for other purposes.	Pub. L. 118–247 (text) (PDF), H.R. 8012
118-248	Jan 4, 2025	(No short title)	To designate the facility of the United States Postal Service located at 9317 Bolsa Avenue in Westminster, California, as the "Little Saigon Vietnam War Veterans Memorial Post Office".	Pub. L. 118–248 (text) (PDF), H.R. 8057
118-249	Jan 4, 2025	(No short title)	To designate the facility of the United States Postal Service located at 401 Main Street in Brawley, California, as the "Walter Francis Ulloa Memorial Post Office Building".	Pub. L. 118–249 (text) (PDF), H.R. 8641
118-250	Jan 4, 2025	(No short title)	To amend title 28, United States Code, to authorize holding court for the Central Division of Utah in Moab and Monticello.	Pub. L. 118–250 (text) (PDF), H.R. 8666
118-251	Jan 4, 2025	(No short title)	To rename the community-based outpatient clinic of the Department of Veterans Affairs in Cadillac, Michigan, as the "Duane E. Dewey VA Clinic".	Pub. L. 118–251 (text) (PDF), H.R. 8667
118-252	Jan 4, 2025	(No short title)	To designate the facility of the United States Postal Service located at 20 West Main Street in Santaquin, Utah, as the "SGT Bill Hooser Post Office Building".	Pub. L. 118–252 (text) (PDF), H.R. 8717
118-253	Jan 4, 2025	(No short title)	To designate the facility of the United States Postal Service located at 114 Center Street East in Roseau, Minnesota, as the "Floyd B. Olson Post Office".	Pub. L. 118–253 (text) (PDF), H.R. 8841
118-254	Jan 4, 2025	(No short title)	To designate the facility of the United States Postal Service located at 609 Portsmouth Avenue in Greenland, New Hampshire, as the "Chief Michael Maloney Post Office Building".	Pub. L. 118–254 (text) (PDF), H.R. 8868
118-255	Jan 4, 2025	(No short title)	To designate the facility of the United States Postal Service located at 82-6110 Mamalahoa Highway in Captain Cook, Hawaii, as the "Army 1st Lt. John Kuulei Kauhaihao Post Office Building".	Pub. L. 118–255 (text) (PDF), H.R. 8909
118-256	Jan 4, 2025	(No short title)	To designate the facility of the United States Postal Service located at 151 Highway 74 South in Peachtree City, Georgia, as the "SFC Shawn McCloskey Post Office".	Pub. L. 118–256 (text) (PDF), H.R. 8919
118-257	Jan 4, 2025	(No short title)	To designate the facility of the United States Postal Service located at 20 West White Street in Millstadt, Illinois, as the "Corporal Matthew A. Wyatt Post Office".	Pub. L. 118–257 (text) (PDF), H.R. 8976
118-258	Jan 4, 2025	Supporting America’s Children and Families Act	To reauthorize child welfare programs under part B of title IV of the Social Security Act and strengthen the State and tribal child support enforcement program under part D of such title, and for other purposes.	Pub. L. 118–258 (text) (PDF), H.R. 9076
118-259	Jan 4, 2025	(No short title)	To name the Department of Veterans Affairs community-based outpatient clinic in Auburn, California, as the "Louis A. Conter VA Clinic".	Pub. L. 118–259 (text) (PDF), H.R. 9124
118-260	Jan 4, 2025	(No short title)	To designate the facility of the United States Postal Service located at 3913 Leland Avenue Northwest in Comstock Park, Michigan, as the "Captain Miguel Justin Nava Post Office".	Pub. L. 118–260 (text) (PDF), H.R. 9285
118-261	Jan 4, 2025	(No short title)	To designate the facility of the United States Postal Service located at 675 Wolf Ledges Parkway in Akron, Ohio, as the "Judge James R. Williams Post Office Building".	Pub. L. 118–261 (text) (PDF), H.R. 9322
118-262	Jan 4, 2025	(No short title)	To designate the facility of the United States Postal Service located at 108 North Main Street in Bucoda, Washington, as the "Mayor Rob Gordon Post Office".	Pub. L. 118–262 (text) (PDF), H.R. 9421
118-263	Jan 4, 2025	House Office of Legislative Counsel Modernization Act	To amend the Legislative Reorganization Act of 1970 to authorize the Legislative Counsel of the House of Representatives to designate more than one of the attorneys of the Office of the Legislative Counsel as a Deputy Legislative Counsel, and for other purposes.	Pub. L. 118–263 (text) (PDF), H.R. 9487
118-264	Jan 4, 2025	(No short title)	To designate the facility of the United States Postal Service located at 340 South Loudon Avenue in Baltimore, Maryland, as the "United States Representative Elijah E. Cummings Post Office Building".	Pub. L. 118–264 (text) (PDF), H.R. 9544
118-265	Jan 4, 2025	(No short title)	To designate the facility of the United States Postal Service located at 125 South 1st Avenue in Hillsboro, Oregon, as the "Elizabeth Furse Post Office Building".	Pub. L. 118–265 (text) (PDF), H.R. 9549
118-266	Jan 4, 2025	(No short title)	To designate the facility of the United States Postal Service located at 2777 Brentwood Road in Raleigh, North Carolina, as the "Millie Dunn Veasey Post Office".	Pub. L. 118–266 (text) (PDF), H.R. 9580
118-267	Jan 4, 2025	Federal Register Modernization Act of 2024	To amend title 44, United States Code, to modernize the Federal Register, and for other purposes.	Pub. L. 118–267 (text) (PDF), H.R. 9592
118-268	Jan 4, 2025	(No short title)	To designate the facility of the United States Postal Service located at 119 Main Street in Plains, Georgia, as the "Jimmy and Rosalynn Carter Post Office".	Pub. L. 118–268 (text) (PDF), H.R. 9600
118-269	Jan 4, 2025	(No short title)	To designate the facility of the United States Postal Service located at 119 North Anderson Street in Elwood, Indiana, as the "Officer Noah Jacob Shahnavaz Post Office Building".	Pub. L. 118–269 (text) (PDF), H.R. 9775
118-270	Jan 4, 2025	(No short title)	To designate the facility of the United States Postal Service located at 802 North Tancahua Street in Corpus Christi, Texas, as the "Captain Robert E. 'Bob' Batterson Post Office".	Pub. L. 118–270 (text) (PDF), H.R. 10065
118-271	Jan 4, 2025	Keeping Military Families Together Act of 2024	To amend title 38, United States Code, to extend the entitlement to memorial headstones and markers for commemoration of veterans and certain individuals and to extend authority to bury remains of certain spouses and children in national cemeteries, and for other purposes.	Pub. L. 118–271 (text) (PDF), S. 2181
118-272	Jan 4, 2025	Thomas R. Carper Water Resources Development Act of 2024	To provide for improvements to the rivers and harbors of the United States, to provide for the conservation and development of water and related resources, and for other purposes.	Pub. L. 118–272 (text) (PDF), S. 4367
118-273	Jan 5, 2025	Social Security Fairness Act of 2023	To amend title II of the Social Security Act to repeal the Government pension offset and windfall elimination provisions.	Pub. L. 118–273 (text) (PDF), H.R. 82
118-274	Jan 6, 2025	D.C. Robert F. Kennedy Memorial Stadium Campus Revitalization Act	To direct the Secretary of the Interior to transfer administrative jurisdiction over the Robert F. Kennedy Memorial Stadium Campus to the District of Columbia so that the District may use the Campus for purposes including residential and commercial development, and for other purposes.	Pub. L. 118–274 (text) (PDF), H.R. 4984

== Treaties ==
The 118th Congress has approved the following treaties:

Treaty document number	Date of ratification	Short title	Senate vote
Treaty 112-8	June 22, 2023	Tax Convention with Chile	95-2

== See also ==
- List of bills in the 118th United States Congress
- List of United States federal legislation
- Lists of acts of the United States Congress
- 2020s in United States political history
