= List of bills in the 118th United States Congress =

118th United States Congress
←	117th	119th	→
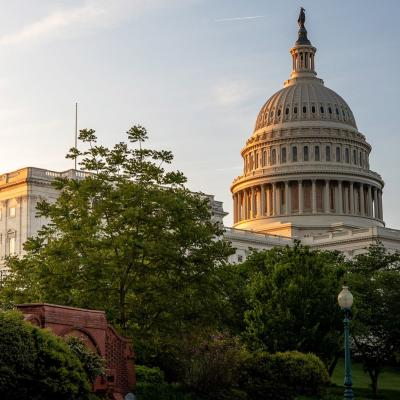
- United States Capitol (2023)

Overview
- Legislative body: United States Congress
- Jurisdiction: United States
- Term: January 3, 2023 – January 3, 2025

Senate
- Members: 100
- President: Kamala Harris (D)
- Party control: Democratic

House of Representatives
- Members: 435 representatives 6 non-voting delegates
- Speaker: Kevin McCarthy (R) until October 3, 2023; Mike Johnson (R) from October 25, 2023
- Party control: Republican

Sessions
- 1st: January 3, 2023 – TBD

The bills of the 118th United States Congress list includes proposed federal laws that were introduced in the 118th United States Congress.

The United States Congress is the bicameral legislature of the federal government of the United States consisting of two houses: the lower house known as the House of Representatives and the upper house known as the Senate. The House and Senate are equal partners in the legislative process—legislation cannot be enacted without the consent of both chambers.

Once a bill is approved by one house, it is sent to the other which may pass, reject, or amend it. For the bill to become law, both houses must agree to identical versions of the bill. After passage by both houses, a bill is enrolled and sent to the president for signature or veto. Bills from the 118th Congress that have successfully completed this process become public laws, listed as Acts of the 118th United States Congress.

== Introduced in the House of Representatives ==
=== Passed by both houses, signed by President ===
H.R. number	Date of introduction	Short title	Long title
H.J.Res. 7	January 9, 2023	(No short title)	Relating to a national emergency declared by the President on March 31, 2020.
H.J.Res. 26	February 2, 2023	(No short title)	Disapproving the action of the District of Columbia Council in approving the Revised Criminal Code Act of 2022.
H.R. 3746	May 29, 2023	Fiscal Responsibility Act of 2023	To provide for a responsible increase to the debt ceiling.
H.R. 346	January 12, 2023	NOTAM Improvement Act of 2023	To establish a task force on improvements for notices to air missions and for other purposes.
H.R. 3672	May 25, 2023	(No short title)	To designate the clinic of the Department of Veterans Affairs in Indian River, Michigan, as the “Pfc. Justin T. Paton Department of Veterans Affairs Clinic”.
H.R. 1096	July 26, 2023	250th Anniversary of the United States Marine Corps Commemorative Coin Act	To require the Secretary of the Treasury to mint coins in commemoration of the 250th Anniversary of the United States Marine Corps, and to support programs at the Marine Corps Heritage Center.
H.R. 4004	June 12, 2023	United States-Taiwan Initiative on 21st-Century Trade First Agreement Implementation Act	To approve and implement the Agreement between the American Institute in Taiwan and the Taipei Economic and Cultural Representative Office in the United States regarding Trade between the United States of America and Taiwan, and for other purposes.
H.R. 2544	April 10, 2023	Securing the U.S. Organ Procurement and Transplantation Network Act	To improve the Organ Procurement and Transplantation Network, and for other purposes.
H.R. 5680	September 30, 2023	Continuing Appropriations Act, 2024 and Other Extensions Act	Making continuing appropriations for fiscal year 2024, and for other purposes.
H.R. 5110	August 1, 2023	Protecting Hunting Heritage and Education Act	To amend the Elementary and Secondary Education Act of 1965 to clarify that the prohibition on the use of Federal education funds for certain weapons does not apply to the use of such weapons for training in archery, hunting, or other shooting sports.
H.R. 366	January 13, 2023	Korean-American VALOR Act	To amend title 38, United States Code, to treat certain individuals who served in Vietnam as a member of the armed forces of the Republic of Korea as a veteran of the Armed Forces of the United States for purposes of the provision of health care by the Department of Veterans Affairs.
H.R. 1226	February 28, 2023	Wounded Warrior Access Act	To amend title 38, United States Code, to allow for the electronic request of certain records, and for other purposes.
H.R. 6363	November 13, 2023	Further Continuing Appropriations and Other Extensions Act, 2024	Making further continuing appropriations for fiscal year 2024, and for other purposes.
H.R. 3315	May 15, 2023	National Guard and Reservists Debt Relief Extension Act of 2023	To exempt for an additional 4-year period, from the application of the means-test presumption of abuse under chapter 7, qualifying members of reserve components of the Armed Forces and members of the National Guard who, after September 11, 2001, are called to active duty or to perform a homeland defense activity for not less than 90 days.
H.R. 1734	March 23, 2023	TRANQ Research Act	To require coordinated National Institute of Standards and Technology science and research activities regarding illicit drugs containing xylazine, novel synthetic opioids, and other substances of concern, and for other purposes.
H.J.Res. 62	May 11, 2023	(No short title)	Providing for the appointment of Antoinette Bush as a citizen regent of the Board of Regents of the Smithsonian Institution.
H.J.Res. 63	May 11, 2023	(No short title)	Providing for the reappointment of Roger W. Ferguson as a citizen regent of the Board of Regents of the Smithsonian Institution.
H.J.Res. 64	May 11, 2023	(No short title)	Providing for the reappointment of Michael Govan as a citizen regent of the Board of Regents of the Smithsonian Institution.
H.R. 2670	April 18, 2023	National Defense Authorization Act for Fiscal Year 2024	To authorize appropriations for fiscal year 2024 for military activities of the Department of Defense and for military construction, and for defense activities of the Department of Energy, to prescribe military personnel strengths for such fiscal year, and for other purposes.
H.R. 1722	March 22, 2023	Grand Ronde Reservation Act Amendment of 2023	To amend the Grand Ronde Reservation Act, and for other purposes.
H.R. 6503	November 29, 2023	Airport and Airway Extension Act of 2023, Part II	To amend title 49, United States Code, to extend authorizations for the airport improvement program, to amend the Internal Revenue Code of 1986 to extend the funding and expenditure authority of the Airport and Airway Trust Fund, and for other purposes.
H.R. 2839	April 25, 2023	(No short title)	To amend the Siletz Reservation Act to address the hunting, fishing, trapping, and animal gathering rights of the Confederated Tribes of Siletz Indians, and for other purposes.
H.R. 9106	July 23, 2024	Enhanced Presidential Security Act of 2024	Requires the U.S. Secret Service to apply the same standards for determining the number of agents required to protect Presidents, Vice Presidents, and major Presidential and Vice Presidential candidates.

=== Passed by both houses, vetoed by President ===
H.R. number	Date of introduction	Long title
H.J.Res. 27	February 2, 2023	Providing for congressional disapproval under chapter 8 of title 5, United States Code, of the rule submitted by the Department of the Army, Corps of Engineers, Department of Defense, and the Environmental Protection Agency relating to "Revised Definition of 'Waters of the United States'".
H.J.Res. 30	March 1, 2023	Providing for congressional disapproval under chapter 8 of title 5, United States Code, of the rule submitted by the Department of Labor relating to "Prudence and Loyalty in Selecting Plan Investments and Exercising Shareholder Rights".
H.J.Res. 39	March 7, 2023	Disapproving the rule submitted by the Department of Commerce relating to "Procedures Covering Suspension of Liquidation, Duties and Estimated Duties in Accord With Presidential Proclamation 10414".
H.J.Res. 42	March 9, 2023	Disapproving the action of the District of Columbia Council in approving the Comprehensive Policing and Justice Reform Amendment Act of 2022.
H.J.Res. 45	March 27, 2023	Providing for congressional disapproval under chapter 8 of title 5, United States Code, of the rule submitted by the Department of Education relating to "Waivers and Modifications of Federal Student Loans".
H.J.Res. 98	November 9, 2023	Providing for congressional disapproval under chapter 8 of title 5, United States Code, of the rule submitted by the National Labor Relations Board relating to "Standard for Determining Joint Employer Status".
H.J.Res. 109	February 1, 2024	Providing for congressional disapproval under chapter 8 of title 5, United States Code, of the rule submitted by the Securities and Exchange Commission relating to "Staff Accounting Bulletin No. 121".

=== Passed by both houses, resolving differences ===
H.R. number	Date of introduction	Short title	Long title

=== Passed by both houses awaiting signature ===
H.R. number	Date of introduction	Short title	Long title

Passed by the House, passed by Senate with an amendment, awaiting House action

H.R. number	Date of introduction	Short title	Long title
H.R. 4366	June 27, 2023	Consolidated Appropriations Act, 2024	Making appropriations for military construction, the Department of Veterans Affairs, and related agencies for the fiscal year ending September 30, 2024, and for other purposes.

=== Passed by both houses, no presidential consent needed ===
H.R. number	Date of introduction	Long title
H.Con.Res. 11	January 25, 2023	Providing for a joint session of Congress to receive a message from the President.
H.Con.Res. 15	February 9, 2023	Authorizing the use of the Capitol Grounds for the National Peace Officers Memorial Service and the National Honor Guard and Pipe Band Exhibition.
H.Con.Res. 25	March 17, 2023	Authorizing the use of Emancipation Hall in the Capitol Visitor Center for a ceremony as part of the commemoration of the days of remembrance of victims of the Holocaust.
H.Con.Res. 35	April 25, 2023	Authorizing the use of Emancipation Hall in the Capitol Visitor Center for an event to celebrate a King Kamehameha Day Lei Draping Ceremony.
H.Con.Res. 43	February 9, 2023	Authorizing the use of the Capitol Grounds for the Greater Washington Soap Box Derby.

=== Passed by the House, waiting in the Senate ===
H.R. number	Date of introduction	Short title	Long title	Description
H.Con.Res. 1	January 9, 2023	(No short title)	Regarding consent to assemble outside the seat of government.	
H.Con.Res. 3	January 9, 2023	(No short title)	Expressing the sense of Congress condemning the recent attacks on pro-life facilities, groups, and churches.	
H.Con.Res. 7	January 9, 2023	(No short title)	Commending the bravery, courage, and resolve of the women and men of Iran demonstrating in more than 133 cities and risking their safety to speak out against the Iranian regime's human rights abuses.	
H.Con.Res. 9	January 25, 2023	(No short title)	Denouncing the horrors of socialism.	
H.R. 2	May 2, 2023	Secure the Border Act of 2023	To secure the borders of the United States, and for other purposes	
H.R. 21	January 9, 2023	Strategic Production Response Act	To provide for the development of a plan to increase oil and gas production under oil and gas leases of Federal lands under the jurisdiction of the Secretary of Agriculture, the Secretary of Energy, the Secretary of the Interior, and the Secretary of Defense in conjunction with a drawdown of petroleum reserves from the Strategic Petroleum Reserve.	
H.R. 22	January 9, 2023	Protecting America's Strategic Petroleum Reserve from China Act	To prohibit the Secretary of Energy from sending petroleum products from the Strategic Petroleum Reserve to China, and for other purposes.	Prohibits the sale and export of crude oil from the Strategic Petroleum Reserve (SPR) to China. Specifically, the bill prohibits the Department of Energy (DOE) from selling petroleum products (e.g., crude oil) from the SPR to any entity that is under the ownership, control, or influence of the Chinese Communist Party. Further, DOE must require as a condition of any sale of crude oil from the SPR that the oil not be exported to China.
H.R. 23	January 9, 2023	Family and Small Business Taxpayer Protection Act	To rescind certain balances made available to the Internal Revenue Service.	Rescinds certain unobligated amounts made available to the Internal Revenue Service by the Inflation Reduction Act of 2022 for (1) its enforcement activities and operations support, (2) the efile tax return system, and (3) funding the U.S. Tax Court and certain Department of the Treasury tax agencies.
H.R. 26	January 9, 2023	Born-Alive Abortion Survivors Protection Act	To amend title 18, United States Code, to prohibit a health care practitioner from failing to exercise the proper degree of care in the case of a child who survives an abortion or attempted abortion.	Establishes requirements for the degree of care a health care practitioner must provide in the case of a child born alive following an abortion or attempted abortion.
H.R. 139	January 9, 2023	SHOW UP Act of 2023	To require Executive agencies to submit to Congress a study of the impacts of expanded telework and remote work by agency employees during the COVID-19 pandemic and a plan for the agency's future use of telework and remote work, and for other purposes.	
H.R. 159	January 9, 2023	Chance to Compete Act of 2023	To implement merit-based reforms to the civil service hiring system that replace degree-based hiring with skills- and competency-based hiring, and for other purposes.	
H.R. 255	January 10, 2023	Federal Disaster Assistance Coordination Act	To amend the Disaster Recovery Reform Act of 2018 to develop a study regarding streamlining and consolidating information collection and preliminary damage assessments, and for other purposes.	
H.R. 259	January 10, 2023	Post-Disaster Assistance Online Accountability Act	To provide for an online repository for certain reporting requirements for recipients of Federal disaster assistance, and for other purposes.	
H.R. 290	January 11, 2023	Commercial Remote Sensing Amendment Act of 2023	To provide for transparent licensing of commercial remote sensing systems, and for other purposes.	
H.R. 298	January 11, 2023	Expanding Access to Capital for Rural Job Creators Act	To amend the Securities Exchange Act of 1934 to expand access to capital for rural-area small businesses, and for other purposes.	
H.R. 300	January 11, 2023	Settlement Agreement Information Database Act of 2023	To amend chapter 3 of title 5, United States Code, to require the publication of settlement agreements, and for other purposes.	
H.R. 302	January 11, 2023	Energy Cybersecurity University Leadership Act of 2023	To direct the Secretary of Energy to provide financial assistance to graduate students and postdoctoral researchers pursuing certain courses of study relating to cybersecurity and energy infrastructure, and for other purposes.	
H.R. 342	January 12, 2023	Cost-Share Accountability Act of 2023	To amend the Energy Policy Act of 2005 to require reporting relating to certain cost-share requirements, and for other purposes.	
H.R. 382	January 17, 2023	Pandemic is Over Act	To terminate the public health emergency declared with respect to COVID-19.	
H.R. 388	January 17, 2023	Securities and Exchange Commission Real Estate Leasing Authority Revocation Act	To amend title 40, United States Code, to eliminate the leasing authority of the Securities and Exchange Commission, and for other purposes.	
H.R. 399	January 20, 2023	Small Business Advocacy Improvements Act of 2023	To clarify the primary functions and duties of the Office of Advocacy of the Small Business Administration, and for other purposes.	
H.R. 400	January 20, 2023	Investing in Main Street Act of 2023	To amend the Small Business Investment Act of 1958 to increase the amount that may be invested in small business investment companies.	
H.R. 423	January 20, 2023	Pala Band of Mission Indians Land Transfer Act of 2023	To take certain land located in San Diego County, California into trust for the benefit of the Pala Band of Mission Indians, and for other purposes.	
H.R. 449	January 24, 2023	Microloan Transparency and Accountability Act of 2023	To amend the Small Business Act to increase transparency, and for other purposes.	
H.R. 497	January 25, 2023	Freedom for Health Care Workers Act	To eliminate the COVID-19 vaccine mandate on health care providers furnishing items and services under certain Federal health care programs.	
H.R. 500	January 25, 2023	Financial Exploitation Prevention Act of 2023	To amend the Investment Company Act of 1940 to postpone the date of payment or satisfaction upon redemption of certain securities in the case of the financial exploitation of specified adults, and for other purposes.	
H.R. 548	January 26, 2023	Eastern Band of Cherokee Historic Lands Reacquisition Act	To take certain Federal lands in Tennessee into trust for the benefit of the Eastern Band of Cherokee Indians.	
H.R. 582	January 26, 2023	Credit Union Board Modernization Act	To amend the Federal Credit Union Act to modify the frequency of board of directors meetings, and for other purposes.	
H.R. 734	February 1, 2023	Protection of Women and Girls in Sports Act of 2023	To amend the Education Amendments of 1972 to provide that for purposes of determining compliance with title IX of such Act in athletics, sex shall be recognized based solely on a person's reproductive biology and genetics at birth.	
H.R. 2811	April 25, 2023	Limit, Save, Grow Act of 2023	To provide for a responsible increase to the debt limit, and for other purposes.	
H.R. 6544	December 1, 2023	Atomic Energy Advancement Act	To advance the benefits of nuclear energy by enabling efficient, timely, and predictable licensing, regulation, and deployment of nuclear energy technologies, and for other purposes.	
H.R. 7511	March 1, 2024	Laken Riley Act	To require the Secretary of Homeland Security to take into custody aliens who have been charged in the United States with theft, and for other purposes.	

=== Passed by the House, no Senate consent needed ===
H.R. number	Date of introduction	Long title
H.Res. 1	January 9, 2023	Electing officers of the House of Representatives.
H.Res. 2	January 9, 2023	To inform the Senate that a quorum of the House has assembled and election of the Speaker and the Clerk.
H.Res. 3	January 9, 2023	Authorizing the Speaker to appoint a committee to notify the President of the assembly of the Congress.
H.Res. 4	January 9, 2023	Authorizing the Clerk to inform the President of the election of the Speaker and the Clerk.
H.Res. 5	January 9, 2023	Adopting the Rules of the House of Representatives for the One Hundred Eighteenth Congress, and for other purposes.
H.Res. 6	January 9, 2023	Fixing the daily hour of meeting of the First Session of the One Hundred Eighteenth Congress.
H.Res. 11	January 9, 2023	Establishing the Select Committee on the Strategic Competition Between the United States and the Chinese Communist Party.
H.Res. 12	January 9, 2023	Establishing a Select Subcommittee on the Weaponization of the Federal Government as a select investigative subcommittee of the Committee on the Judiciary.
H.Res. 14	January 10, 2023	Electing Members to certain standing committees of the House of Representatives.
H.Res. 15	January 10, 2023	Electing Members to certain standing committees of the House of Representatives.
H.Res. 56	January 25, 2023	Electing Members to certain standing committees of the House of Representatives.
H.Res. 57	January 25, 2023	Electing Members to certain standing committees of the House of Representatives.
H.Res. 60	January 26, 2023	Electing Members to certain standing committees of the House of Representatives.
H.Res. 67	January 26, 2023	Providing amounts for the expenses of the Select Committee on the Strategic Competition Between the United States and the Chinese Communist Party.
H.Res. 70	January 30, 2023	Electing Members to certain standing committees of the House of Representatives.
H.Res. 71	January 30, 2023	Electing Members to certain standing committees of the House of Representatives and ranking a Member on a certain standing committee of the House of Representatives.
H.Res. 75	January 31, 2023	Providing for consideration of the joint resolution (H.Res. 7) relating to a national emergency declared by the President on March 13, 2020; providing for consideration of the bill (H.R. 139) to require Executive agencies to submit to Congress a study of the impacts of expanded telework and remote work by agency employees during the COVID-19 pandemic and a plan for the agency's future use of telework and remote work, and for other purposes; providing for consideration of the bill (H.R. 382) to terminate the public health emergency declared with respect to COVID-19; and providing for consideration of the bill (H.R. 497) to eliminate the COVID-19 vaccine mandate on health care providers furnishing items and services under certain Federal health care programs.
H.Res. 76	January 31, 2023	Removing a certain Member from a certain standing committee of the House.
H.Res. 78	January 31, 2023	Providing for a certain total number of members on certain select committees and subcommittees, and for other purposes.
H.Res. 79	January 31, 2023	Electing Members to certain standing committees of the House of Representatives.
H.Res. 80	January 31, 2023	Electing Members to certain standing committees of the House of Representatives.
H.Res. 83	February 1, 2023	Providing for consideration of the concurrent resolution (H.Con.Res. 9) denouncing the horrors of socialism, and providing for consideration of the resolution (H.Res. 76) removing a certain Member from a certain standing committee of the House.
H.Res. 84	February 1, 2023	Electing a Member to a certain standing committee of the House of Representatives.
H.Res. 87	February 1, 2023	Electing Members to certain standing committees of the House of Representatives.
H.Res. 90	February 1, 2023	Demanding that the Government of the People's Republic of China and the Chinese Communist Party immediately release Mark Swidan.
H.Res. 97	February 7, 2023	Providing for consideration of the bill (H.R. 185) to terminate the requirement imposed by the Director of the Centers for Disease Control and Prevention for proof of COVID-19 vaccination for foreign travelers, and for other purposes; providing for consideration of the joint resolution (H.J.Res. 4) disapproving the action of the District of Columbia Council in approving the Local Resident Voting Rights Amendment Act of 2022; and providing for consideration of the joint resolution (H.J.Res. 26) disapproving the action of the District of Columbia Council in approving the Revised Criminal Code Act of 2022.
H.Res. 102	February 8, 2023	Electing Members to certain standing committees of the House.
H.Res. 103	February 8, 2023	Electing Members to a certain standing committee of the House of Representatives.
H.Res. 104	February 8, 2023	Condemning the Chinese Communist Party's use of a high-altitude surveillance balloon over United States territory as a brazen violation of United States sovereignty.
H.Res. 132	February 17, 2023	Responding to the earthquakes in Türkiye and Syria on February 6, 2023.
H.Res. 149	February 21, 2023	Condemning the illegal abduction and forcible transfer of children from Ukraine to the Russian Federation.
H.Res. 164	February 27, 2023	Electing Members to certain standing committees of the House of Representatives.
H.Res. 166	February 27, 2023	Providing for consideration of the bill (H.R. 347) to require the Executive Office of the President to provide an inflation estimate with respect to Executive orders with a significant effect on the annual gross budget, and for other purposes, and providing for consideration of the joint resolution (H.J.Res. 30) providing for congressional disapproval under chapter 8 of title 5, United States Code, of the rule submitted by the Department of Labor relating to "Prudence and Loyalty in Selecting Plan Investments and Exercising Shareholder Rights".
H.Res. 179	February 28, 2023	Electing Members to certain standing committees of the House of Representatives.
H.Res. 194	March 3, 2023	Electing Members to the Joint Committee of Congress on the Library and the Joint Committee on Printing.
H.Res. 197	March 7, 2023	Providing for the expenses of certain committees of the House of Representatives in the One Hundred Eighteenth Congress.
H.Res. 199	March 7, 2023	Providing for consideration of the bill (H.R. 140) to amend title 5, United States Code, to prohibit Federal employees from advocating for censorship of viewpoints in their official capacity, and for other purposes; providing for consideration of the joint resolution (H.J.Res. 27) providing for congressional disapproval under chapter 8 of title 5, United States Code, of the rule submitted by the Department of the Army, Corps of Engineers, Department of Defense and the Environmental Protection Agency relating to "Revised Definition of 'Waters of the United States'"; and providing for consideration of the bill (S. 619) to require the Director of National Intelligence to declassify information relating to the origin of COVID-19, and for other purposes.
H.Res. 205	March 8, 2023	Electing Members to certain standing committees of the House of Representatives and ranking a Member on a certain standing committee of the House of Representatives.
H.Res. 240	March 21, 2023	Condemning recent actions taken by the Russian military to down a United States Air Force drone.
H.Res. 241	March 22, 2023	Providing for consideration of the bill (H.R. 5) to ensure the rights of parents are honored and protected in the Nation's public schools.
H.Res. 260	March 28, 2023	Providing for consideration of the bill (H.R. 1) to lower energy costs by increasing American energy production, exports, infrastructure, and critical minerals processing, by promoting transparency, accountability, permitting, and production of American resources, and by improving water quality certification and energy projects, and for other purposes.
H.Res. 272	March 20, 2023	Calling on the Government of the Russian Federation to immediately release United States citizen Paul Whelan.
H.Res. 288	April 13, 2023	Encouraging the European Union to Determine that the European Union Should Sanction the Iranian Revolutionary Guard Corps Now As a Terrorist Entity Resolution
H.Res. 298	April 17, 2023	Providing for consideration of the bill (H.R. 734) to amend the Education Amendments of 1972 to provide that for purposes of determining compliance with title IX of such Act in athletics, sex shall be recognized based solely on a person's reproductive biology and genetics at birth, and providing for consideration of the joint resolution (H.J.Res. 42) disapproving the action of the District of Columbia Council in approving the Comprehensive Policing and Justice Reform Amendment Act of 2022.
H.Res. 311	April 20, 2023	Encouraging the expansion and strengthening of the Abraham Accords to urge other nations to normalize relations with Israel and ensure that existing agreements reap tangible security and economic benefits for the citizens of those countries and all peoples in the region.
H.Res. 321	April 25, 2023	Permitting official photographs of the House of Representatives to be taken while the House is in actual session on a date designated by the Speaker.
H.Res. 327	April 26, 2023	Providing for consideration of the bill (H.R. 2811) to provide for a responsible increase to the debt ceiling, and for other purposes, and providing for consideration of the joint resolution (H.J.Res. 39) disapproving the rule submitted by the Department of Commerce relating to "Procedures Covering Suspension of Liquidation, Duties and Estimated Duties in Accord With Presidential Proclamation 10414".
H.Res. 328	April 26, 2023	Authorizing video recording in the House Chamber during a joint meeting of Congress for certain educational purposes.
H.Res. 363	May 5, 2023	Resolution memorializing law enforcement officers killed in the line of duty
H.Res. 377	May 9, 2023	Calling for the immediate release of Evan Gershkovich, a United States citizen and journalist, who was wrongfully detained by the Government of the Russian Federation in March 2023.
H.Res. 382	May 9, 2023	Recognizing the significance of Jewish American Heritage Month as a time to celebrate the contributions of Jewish Americans to the society and culture of the United States.
H.Res. 383	May 10, 2023	Providing for consideration of the bill (H.R. 2) to secure the borders of the United States, and for other purposes, and providing for consideration of the bill (H.R. 1163) to provide incentives for States to recover fraudulently paid Federal and State unemployment compensation, and for other purposes.
H.Res. 398	May 15, 2023	Providing for consideration of the bill (H.R. 2494) to make the assault of a law enforcement officer a deportable offense, and for other purposes; providing for consideration of the bill (H.R. 3091) to allow Federal law enforcement officers to purchase retired service weapons, and for other purposes; and providing for consideration of the concurrent resolution (H.Con.Res. 40) expressing support for local law enforcement officers and condemning efforts to defund or dismantle local law enforcement agencies.
H.Res. 429	May 22, 2023	Providing for consideration of the bill (H.R. 467) to amend the Controlled Substances Act with respect to the scheduling of fentanyl-related substances, and for other purposes; providing for consideration of the joint resolution (S.J.Res. 11) providing for congressional disapproval under chapter 8 of title 5, United States Code, of the rule submitted by the Environmental Protection Agency relating to "Control of Air Pollution From New Motor Vehicles: Heavy-Duty Engine and Vehicle Standards"; and providing for consideration of the joint resolution (H.J.Res. 45) providing for congressional disapproval under chapter 8 of title 5, United States Code, of the rule submitted by the Department of Education relating to "Waivers and Modifications of Federal Student Loans".
H.Res. 435	May 22, 2023	Requiring each Member, officer, and employee of the House of Representatives to complete a program of training in workplace rights and responsibilities each session of each Congress, and for other purposes.
H.Res. 456	May 30, 2023	Providing for consideration of the bill (H.R. 3746) to provide for a responsible increase to the debt ceiling.
H.Res. 461	June 1, 2023	Condemning the use of elementary and secondary school facilities to provide shelter for aliens who are not admitted to the United States.
H.Res. 492	June 9, 2023	Condemning the Government of Iran's state-sponsored persecution of the Baha'i minority and its continued violation of the International Covenants on Human Rights.
H.Res. 495	June 12, 2023	Providing for consideration of the joint resolution (H.J.Res. 44) providing for congressional disapproval under chapter 8 of title 5, United States Code, of the rule submitted by the Bureau of Alcohol, Tobacco, Firearms, and Explosives relating to "Factoring Criteria for Firearms with Attached 'stabilizing braces'"; providing for consideration of the bill (H.R. 277) to amend chapter 8 of title 5, United States Code, to provide that major rules of the executive branch shall have no force or effect unless a joint resolution of approval is enacted into law; providing for consideration of the bill (H.R. 288) to amend title 5, United States Code, to clarify the nature of judicial review of agency interpretations of statutory and regulatory provisions; providing for consideration of the bill (H.R. 1615) to prohibit the use of Federal funds to ban gas stoves; and providing for consideration of the bill (H.R. 1640) to prohibit the Secretary of Energy from finalizing, implementing, or enforcing the proposed rule titled "Energy Conservation Program: Energy Conservation Standards for Consumer Conventional Cooking Products", and for other purposes.
H.Res. 502	June 13, 2023	Electing a Member to a certain standing committee of the House of Representatives.
H.Res. 521	June 16, 2023	Censuring Adam Schiff, Representative of the 30th Congressional District of California.
H.Res. 523	June 20, 2023	Authorizing video recording in the House Chamber during a joint meeting of Congress for certain educational purposes.
H.Res. 524	June 20, 2023	Providing for consideration of the bill (H.R. 3564) to cancel recent changes made by the Federal Housing Finance Agency to the up-front loan level pricing adjustments charged by Fannie Mae and Freddie Mac for guarantee of single-family mortgages, and for other purposes; providing for consideration of the bill (H.R. 3799) to amend the Internal Revenue Code of 1986 to provide for health reimbursement arrangements integrated with individual health insurance coverage; and providing for consideration of the resolution (H.Res. 461) condemning the use of elementary and secondary school facilities to provide shelter for aliens who are not admitted to the United States.
H.Res. 529	June 21, 2023	Relating to the resolution (H.Res. 503) impeaching Joseph R. Biden, Jr., President of the United States, for high crimes and misdemeanors.
H.Res. 559	June 27, 2023	Declaring it is the policy of the United States that a nuclear Islamic Republic of Iran is not acceptable.
H.Res. 757	October 3, 2023	Declaring the office of Speaker of the House of Representatives to be vacant.
H.Res. 845	November 6, 2023	Censuring Representative Rashida Tlaib for promoting false narratives regarding the October 7, 2023, Hamas attack on Israel and for calling for the destruction of the state of Israel.
H.Res. 863	November 13, 2023	Impeaching Alejandro Nicholas Mayorkas, Secretary of Homeland Security, for high crimes and misdemeanors.
H.Res. 878	November 17, 2023	Providing for the expulsion of Representative George Santos from the United States House of Representatives.
H.Res. 914	December 6, 2023	Censuring Representative Jamaal Bowman.
H.Res. 1160	April 19, 2024	Providing for consideration of the bill (H.R. 8034) making emergency supplemental appropriations to respond to the situation in Israel and for related expenses for the fiscal year ending September 30, 2024, and for other purposes; providing for consideration of the bill (H.R. 8035) making emergency supplemental appropriations to respond to the situation in Ukraine and for related expenses for the fiscal year ending September 30, 2024, and for other purposes; providing for consideration of the bill (H.R. 8036) making emergency supplemental appropriations for assistance for the Indo-Pacific region and for related expenses for the fiscal year ending September 30, 2024, and for other purposes; providing for consideration of the bill (H.R. 8038) to authorize the President to impose certain sanctions with respect to Russia and Iran, and for other purposes; and providing for the concurrence by the House in the Senate amendment to H.R. 815, with an amendment.
H.Res. 1172	April 29, 2024	Expressing the profound sorrow of the House of Representatives on the death of the Honorable Donald M. Payne, Jr.
H.Res. 1173	April 29, 2024	Providing for consideration of the bill (H.R. 615) to prohibit the Secretary of the Interior and the Secretary of Agriculture from prohibiting the use of lead ammunition or tackle on certain Federal land or water under the jurisdiction of the Secretary of the Interior and the Secretary of Agriculture, and for other purposes; providing for consideration of the bill (H.R. 2925) to amend the Omnibus Budget Reconciliation Act of 1993 to provide for security of tenure for use of mining claims for ancillary activities, and for other purposes; providing for consideration of the bill (H.R. 3195) to rescind Public Land Order 7917, to reinstate mineral leases and permits in the Superior National Forest, to ensure timely review of Mine Plans of Operations, and for other purposes; providing for consideration of the bill (H.R. 764) to require the Secretary of the Interior to reissue regulations removing the gray wolf from the list of endangered and threatened wildlife under the Endangered Species Act of 1973; providing for consideration of the bill (H.R. 3397) to require the Director of the Bureau of Land Management to withdraw a rule of the Bureau of Land Management relating to conservation and landscape health; providing for consideration of the bill (H.R. 6285) to ratify and approve all authorizations, permits, verifications, extensions, biological opinions, incidental take statements, and any other approvals or orders issued pursuant to Federal law necessary for the establishment and administration of the Coastal Plain oil and gas leasing program, and for other purposes; and providing for consideration of the bill (H.R. 6090) to provide for the consideration of a definition of antisemitism set forth by the International Holocaust Remembrance Alliance for the enforcement of Federal antidiscrimination laws concerning education programs or activities, and for other purposes.
H.Res. 1194	May 6, 2024	Providing for consideration of the bill (H.R. 6192) to amend the Energy Policy and Conservation Act to prohibit the Secretary of Energy from prescribing any new or amended energy conservation standard for a product that is not technologically feasible and economically justified, and for other purposes; providing for consideration of the bill (H.R. 7109) to require a citizenship question on the decennial census, to require reporting on certain census statistics, and to modify apportionment of Representatives to be based on United States citizens instead of all persons; providing for consideration of the joint resolution (H.J.Res. 109) providing for congressional disapproval under chapter 8 of title 5, United States Code, of the rule submitted by the Securities and Exchange Commission relating to "Staff Accounting Bulletin No. 121"; and providing for consideration of the bill (H.R. 2925) to amend the Omnibus Budget Reconciliation Act of 1993 to provide for security of tenure for use of mining claims for ancillary activities, and for other purposes.
H.Res. 1204	May 7, 2024	Electing a Member to a certain standing committee of the House of Representatives.
H.Res. 1210	May 8, 2024	Condemning the Biden border crisis and the tremendous burdens law enforcement officers face as a result.
H.Res. 1213	May 8, 2024	A resolution regarding violence against law enforcement officers.
H.Res. 1215	May 8, 2024	Calling on elected officials and civil society leaders to join in efforts to educate the public on the contributions of the Jewish American community.
H.Res. 1227	May 15, 2024	Providing for consideration of the bill (H.R. 8369) to provide for the expeditious delivery of defense articles and defense services for Israel and other matters; providing for consideration of the bill (H.R. 7530) to limit youth offender status in the District of Columbia to individuals 18 years of age or younger, to direct the Attorney General of the District of Columbia to establish and operate a publicly accessible website containing updated statistics on juvenile crime in the District of Columbia, to amend the District of Columbia Home Rule Act to prohibit the Council of the District of Columbia from enacting changes to existing criminal liability sentences, and for other purposes; providing for consideration of the bill (H.R. 7343) to amend the Immigration and Nationality Act to provide for the detention of certain aliens who commit assault against law enforcement officers; providing for consideration of the bill (H.R. 8146) to require a report by the Attorney General on the impact the border crisis is having on law enforcement at the Federal, State, local, and Tribal level; providing for consideration of the bill (H.R. 7581) to require the Attorney General to develop reports relating to violent attacks against law enforcement officers, and for other purposes; providing for consideration of the bill (H.R. 354) to amend title 18, United States Code, to improve the Law Enforcement Officer Safety Act and provisions relating to the carrying of concealed weapons by law enforcement officers, and for other purposes; providing for consideration of the resolution (H.Res. 1213) a resolution regarding violence against law enforcement officers; and providing for consideration of the resolution (H.R. 1210) condemning the Biden border crisis and the tremendous burdens law enforcement officers face as a result.
H.Res. 1243	May 21, 2024	Providing for consideration of the bill (H.R. 4763) to provide for a system of regulation of digital assets by the Commodity Futures Trading Commission and the Securities and Exchange Commission, and for other purposes; providing for consideration of the bill (H.R. 5403) to amend the Federal Reserve Act to prohibit the Federal reserve banks from offering certain products or services directly to an individual, to prohibit the use of central bank digital currency for monetary policy, and for other purposes; and providing for consideration of the bill (H.R. 192) to prohibit individuals who are not citizens of the United States from voting in elections in the District of Columbia.
H.Res. 1269	June 3, 2024	Providing for consideration of the bill (H.R. 8580) making appropriations for military construction, the Department of Veterans Affairs, and related agencies for the fiscal year ending September 30, 2025, and for other purposes, and providing for consideration of the bill (H.R. 8282) to impose sanctions with respect to the International Criminal Court engaged in any effort to investigate, arrest, detain, or prosecute any protected person of the United States and its allies.
H.Res. 1275	June 4, 2024	Electing Members to certain standing committees of the House of Representatives.
H.Res. 1276	June 4, 2024	Electing Members to certain standing committees of the House of Representatives.
H.Res. 1287	June 11, 2024	Providing for consideration of the bill (H.R. 8070) to authorize appropriations for fiscal year 2025 for military activities of the Department of Defense, for military construction, and for defense activities of the Department of Energy, to prescribe military personnel strengths for such fiscal year; relating to the consideration of House Report 118-527 and an accompanying resolution; and for other purposes.
H.Res. 1291	June 12, 2024	Electing a Member to a certain standing committee of the House of Representatives.
H.Res. 1292	June 12, 2024	Recommending that the House of Representatives find United States Attorney General Merrick B. Garland in contempt of Congress for refusal to comply with a subpoena duly issued by the Committee on the Judiciary.
H.Res. 1293	June 12, 2024	Recommending that the House of Representatives find United States Attorney General Merrick B. Garland in contempt of Congress for refusal to comply with a subpoena duly issued by the Committee on Oversight and Accountability.
H.Res. 1316	June 25, 2024	Providing for consideration of the bill (H.R. 8774) making appropriations for the Department of Defense for the fiscal year ending September 30, 2025, and for other purposes; providing for consideration of the bill (H.R. 8771) making appropriations for the Department of State, foreign operations, and related programs for the fiscal year ending September 30, 2025, and for other purposes; and providing for consideration of the bill (H.R. 8752) making appropriations for the Department of Homeland Security for the fiscal year ending September 30, 2025, and for other purposes.
H.Res. 1322	June 26, 2024	Electing a Member to a certain standing committee of the House of Representatives.
H.Res. 1328	June 27, 2024	Recognizing the actions of the Rapid Support Forces and allied militias in the Darfur region of Sudan against non-Arab ethnic communities as acts of genocide.
H.Res. 1341	July 9, 2024	Providing for consideration of the bill (H.R. 8281) to amend the National Voter Registration Act of 1993 to require proof of United States citizenship to register an individual to vote in elections for Federal office, and for other purposes; providing for consideration of the joint resolution (H.J.Res. 165) providing for congressional disapproval under chapter 8 of title 5, United States Code, of the rule submitted by the Department of Education relating to "Nondiscrimination on the Basis of Sex in Education Programs or Activities Receiving Federal Financial Assistance"; providing for consideration of the bill (H.R. 8772) making appropriations for the Legislative Branch for the fiscal year ending September 30, 2025, and for other purposes; providing for consideration of the bill (H.R. 7700) to prohibit the Secretary of Energy from prescribing or enforcing energy conservation standards for dishwashers that are not cost-effective or technologically feasible, and for other purposes; and providing for consideration of the bill (H.R. 7637) to prohibit the Secretary of Energy from prescribing or enforcing energy conservation standards for refrigerators, refrigerator-freezers, and freezers that are not cost-effective or technologically feasible, and for other purposes.
H.Res. 1342	July 9, 2024	Electing a Member to certain standing committees of the House of Representatives.
H.Res. 1366	July 22, 2024	Expressing the profound sorrow of the House of Representatives on the death of the Honorable Sheila Jackson Lee.
H.Res. 1367	July 22, 2024	Establishing the Task Force on the Attempted Assassination of Donald J. Trump.
H.Res. 1370	July 22, 2024	Providing for consideration of the bill (H.R. 8997) making appropriations for energy and water development and related agencies for the fiscal year ending September 30, 2025, and for other purposes, and providing for consideration of the bill (H.R. 8998) making appropriations for the Department of the Interior, environment, and related agencies for the fiscal year ending September 30, 2025, and for other purposes.
H.Res. 1371	July 22, 2024	Strongly condemning the Biden Administration and its Border Czar, Kamala Harris's, failure to secure the United States border.
H.Res. 1376	July 23, 2024	Providing for consideration of the resolution (H.Res. 1371) strongly condemning the Biden Administration and its Border Czar, Kamala Harris's, failure to secure the United States border.
H.Res. 1427	September 9, 2024	Expressing the profound sorrow of the House of Representatives on the death of the Honorable William J. Pascrell, Jr.
H.Res. 1430	September 10, 2024	Providing for consideration of the bill (H.R. 1398) to establish the CCP Initiative program, and for other purposes; providing for consideration of the bill (H.R. 1425) to require any convention, agreement, or other international instrument on pandemic prevention, preparedness, and response reached by the World Health Assembly to be subject to Senate ratification; providing for consideration of the bill (H.R. 1516) to establish Department of Homeland Security funding restrictions on institutions of higher education that have a relationship with Confucius Institutes, and for other purposes; providing for consideration of the bill (H.R. 7980) to amend the Internal Revenue Code of 1986 to exclude vehicles the batteries of which contain materials sourced from prohibited foreign entities from the clean vehicle credit; providing for consideration of the bill (H.R. 9456) to amend the Defense Production Act of 1950 with respect to foreign investments in United States agriculture, and for other purposes; and providing for consideration of the bill (H.R. 9494) making continuing appropriations for fiscal year 2025, and for other purposes.
H.Res. 1431	September 10, 2024	Electing Members to certain standing committees of the House of Representatives.
H.Res. 1449	September 16, 2024	Condemning the global rise of antisemitism and calling upon countries and international bodies to counter antisemitism.
H.Res. 1455	September 17, 2024	Providing for consideration of the bill (H.R. 3724) to amend the Higher Education Act of 1965 to prohibit recognized accrediting agencies and associations from requiring, encouraging, or coercing institutions of higher education to meet any political litmus test or violate any right protected by the Constitution as a condition of accreditation; providing for consideration of the bill (H.R. 4790) to amend the Federal securities laws with respect to the materiality of disclosure requirements, to establish the Public Company Advisory Committee, and for other purposes; providing for consideration of the bill (H.R. 5179) to require the maintenance of the country of origin markings for imported goods produced in the West Bank or Gaza, and for other purposes; providing for consideration of the bill (H.R. 5339) to amend the Employee Retirement Income Security Act of 1974 to specify requirements concerning the consideration of pecuniary and non-pecuniary factors, and for other purposes; providing for consideration of the bill (H.R. 5717) to provide that sanctuary jurisdictions that provide benefits to aliens who are present in the United States without lawful status under the immigration laws are ineligible for Federal funds intended to benefit such aliens; providing for consideration of the bill (H.R. 7909) to amend the Immigration and Nationality Act to provide that aliens who have been convicted of or who have committed sex offenses or domestic violence are inadmissible and deportable; and providing for consideration of the joint resolution (H.J.Res. 136) providing for congressional disapproval under chapter 8 of title 5, United States Code, of the rule submitted by the Environmental Protection Agency relating to "Multi-Pollutant Emissions Standards for Model Years 2027 and Later Light-Duty and Medium-Duty Vehicles".
H.Res. 1469	September 19, 2024	Ensuring accountability for key officials in the Biden-Harris administration responsible for decisionmaking and execution failures throughout the withdrawal from Afghanistan.
H.Res. 1470	September 19, 2024	Expanding the jurisdiction of the Task Force on the Attempted Assassination of Donald J. Trump.
H.Res. 1486	September 23, 2024	Providing for consideration of the bill (H.R. 3334) to provide for the imposition of sanctions on members of the National Communist Party Congress of the People's Republic of China, and for other purposes; providing for consideration of the bill (H.R. 8205) to amend the Omnibus Crime Control and Safe Streets Act of 1968 to provide that Byrne grant funds may be used for public safety report systems, and for other purposes; providing for consideration of the bill (H.R. 8790) to expedite under the National Environmental Policy Act of 1969 and improve forest management activities on National Forest System lands, on public lands under the jurisdiction of the Bureau of Land Management, and on Tribal lands to return resilience to overgrown, fire-prone forested lands, and for other purposes; providing for consideration of the resolution (H.Res. 1469) ensuring accountability for key officials in the Biden-Harris administration responsible for decisionmaking and execution failures throughout the withdrawal from Afghanistan; and for other purposes.
H.Res. 1492	September 24, 2024	Electing a Member to certain standing committees of the House of Representatives.
H.Res. 1568	November 12, 2024	Providing for consideration of the bill (H.R. 8932) to establish an earlier application processing cycle for the FAFSA; providing for consideration of the bill (H.R. 7409) to amend the Geothermal Steam Act of 1970 to waive the requirement for a Federal drilling permit for certain activities, to exempt certain activities from the requirements of the National Environmental Policy Act of 1969, and for other purposes; and providing for consideration of the bill (H.R. 8446) to amend the Energy Act of 2020 to include critical materials in the definition of critical mineral, and for other purposes.
H.Res. 1576	November 18, 2024	Providing for consideration of the bill (H.R. 1449) to amend the Geothermal Steam Act of 1970 to increase the frequency of lease sales, to require replacement sales, and for other purposes, and providing for consideration of the bill (H.R. 9495) to amend the Internal Revenue Code of 1986 to postpone tax deadlines and reimburse paid late fees for United States nationals who are unlawfully or wrongfully detained or held hostage abroad, to terminate the tax-exempt status of terrorist supporting organizations, and for other purposes.
H.Res. 1585	November 20, 2024	Electing a Member to a certain standing committee of the House of Representatives.
H.Res. 1602	December 3, 2024	Providing for consideration of the bill (H.R. 5349) to develop and disseminate a civic education curriculum and oral history resources regarding certain political ideologies, and for other purposes, and providing for consideration of the bill (H.R. 7198) to amend title 5, United States Code, to require greater transparency for Federal regulatory decisions that impact small businesses, and for other purposes.
H.Res. 1611	December 9, 2024	Providing for the printing of a revised edition of the Rules and Manual of the House of Representatives for the One Hundred Nineteenth Congress.
H.Res. 1612	December 10, 2024	Providing for consideration of the bill (H.R. 7673) to prohibit the Secretary of Energy from prescribing or enforcing energy conservation standards for clothes washers that are not cost-effective or technologically feasible, and for other purposes; providing for consideration of the bill (S. 4199) to authorize additional district judges for the district courts and convert temporary judgeships; and providing for consideration of the Senate amendment to the bill (H.R. 5009) to reauthorize wildlife habitat and conservation programs, and for other purposes.
H.Res. 1616	December 16, 2024	Providing for consideration of the bill (H.R. 115) to amend chapter 8 of title 5, United States Code, to provide for en bloc consideration in resolutions of disapproval for "midnight rules", and for other purposes.
H.Res. 1626	December 31, 2024	Expressing the profound regret and sorrow of the House of Representatives on the death of James Earl Carter, Jr., thirty-ninth President of the United States of America.

=== Incorporated into enacted legislation ===
H.R. number	Date of introduction	Short title	Long title	Incorporated into

=== Other legislation ===
Due to size constraints, this list only includes bills that have been considered by a committee.

H.R.	Date of introduction	Short title	Long title
H.R. 8164	April 30, 2024	Captive Primate Safety Act	To amend the Lacey Act Amendments of 1981 to prohibit certain activities involving prohibited primate species, and for other purposes.
H.R.8566	May 23, 2024	MEGOBARI Act	To require reports and certain actions with respect to the Republic of Georgia.
H.J.Res 227	December 12, 2024	(No short title)	Proposing an amendment to the Constitution of the United States to abolish the electoral college and to provide for the direct election of the President and Vice President of the United States.

== Introduced in the Senate ==
=== Passed by both houses, signed by President ===
S. number	Date of introduction	Short title	Long title
S. 475	September 13, 2023	(No short title)	A bill to amend title 38, United States Code, to extend and modify certain authorities and requirements relating to the Department of Veterans Affairs, and for other purposes.
S. 475	February 16, 2023	(No short title)	A bill to designate the clinic of the Department of Veterans Affairs in Gallup, New Mexico, as the Hiroshi “Hershey” Miyamura VA Clinic.
S. 112	January 26, 2023	(No short title)	A bill to amend title 38, United States Code, to strengthen benefits for children of Vietnam veterans born with spina bifida, and for other purposes.
S. 467	February 16, 2023	CADETS Act	To modify the age requirement for the Student Incentive Payment Program of the State maritime academies.
S. 619	March 1, 2023	COVID-19 Origin Act of 2023	To require the Director of National Intelligence to declassify information relating to the origin of COVID-19, and for other purposes.
S. 777	March 14, 2023	Veterans COLA Act of 2023	To increase, effective as of December 1, 2023, the rates of compensation for veterans with service-connected disabilities and the rates of dependency and indemnity compensation for the survivors of certain disabled veterans, and for other purposes.
S. 30	January 24, 2023	Fiscal Year 2023 Veterans Affairs Major Medical Facility Authorization Act	To authorize major medical facility projects for the Department of Veterans Affairs for fiscal year 2023, and for other purposes.
S. 111	January 26, 2023	Providing Accountability Through Transparency Act of 2023	To require each agency, in providing notice of a rulemaking, to include a link to a 100-word plain language summary of the proposed rule.

=== Passed by both houses, awaiting President's signature ===
S. number	Date of introduction	Short title	Long title
S.J.Res. 38	July 26, 2023	(No short title)	A joint resolution providing for congressional disapproval under chapter 8 of title 5, United States Code, of the rule submitted by the Federal Highway Administration relating to “Waiver of Buy America Requirements for Electric Vehicle Chargers”.

=== Passed by both houses, vetoed by President ===
S. number	Date of introduction	Short title	Long title
S. 4199	April 19, 2024	JUDGES Act of 2024	A bill to authorize additional district judges for the district courts and convert temporary judgeships.
S.J.Res. 9	February 7, 2023	(No short title)	A joint resolution providing for congressional disapproval under chapter 8 of title 5, United States Code, of the rule submitted by the United States Fish and Wildlife Service relating to "Endangered and Threatened Wildlife and Plants; Lesser Prairie-Chicken; Threatened Status with Section 4(d) Rule for the Northern Distinct Population Segment and Endangered Status for the Southern Distinct Population Segment".
S.J.Res. 11	February 9, 2023	(No short title)	A joint resolution providing for congressional disapproval under chapter 8 of title 5, United States Code, of the rule submitted by the Environmental Protection Agency relating to "Control of Air Pollution From New Motor Vehicles: Heavy-Duty Engine and Vehicle Standards".
S.J.Res. 24	March 30, 2023	(No short title)	A joint resolution providing for congressional disapproval under chapter 8 of title 5, United States Code, of the rule submitted by the United States Fish and Wildlife Service relating to "Endangered and Threatened Wildlife and Plants; Endangered Species Status for Northern Long-Eared Bat".
S.J.Res. 32	June 13, 2023	(No short title)	A joint resolution providing for congressional disapproval under chapter 8 of title 5, United States Code, of the rule submitted by the Bureau of Consumer Financial Protection relating to "Small Business Lending Under the Equal Credit Opportunity Act (Regulation B)".
S.J.Res. 38	July 26, 2023	(No short title)	A joint resolution providing for congressional disapproval under chapter 8 of title 5, United States Code, of the rule submitted by the Federal Highway Administration relating to "Waiver of Buy America Requirements for Electric Vehicle Chargers".

=== Passed by both houses, resolving differences ===
S. number	Date of introduction	Short title	Long title

=== Passed by both houses, no presidential consent needed ===
S. number	Date of introduction	Long title

=== Passed by the Senate, passed by House with an amendment, awaiting Senate action ===
S. number	Date of introduction	Short title	Long title
S. 992	March 28, 2023	I-27 Numbering Act of 2023	A bill to amend the Intermodal Surface Transportation Efficiency Act of 1991 to designate the Texas and New Mexico portions of the future Interstate-designated segments of the Ports-to-Plains Corridor as Interstate Route 27, and for other purposes.

=== Passed by the Senate, waiting in the House ===
S. number	Date of introduction	Short title	Long title
S. 112	January 26, 2023	(No short title)	To amend title 38, United States Code, to strengthen benefits for children of Vietnam veterans born with spina bifida, and for other purposes.
S. 206	February 1, 2023	END FENTANYL Act	To require the Commissioner of U.S. Customs and Border Protection to regularly review and update policies and manuals related to inspections at ports of entry.
S. 223	February 1, 2023	(No short title)	A bill to amend the Controlled Substances Act to fix a technical error in the definitions.
S. 227	February 2, 2023	Improving Access to Our Courts Act	To amend title 28, United States Code, to provide an additional place for holding court for the Pecos Division of the Western District of Texas, and for other purposes.
S. 264	February 2, 2023	Lobbying Disclosure Improvement Act	To amend the Lobbying Disclosure Act of 1995 to require certain disclosures by registrants regarding exemptions under the Foreign Agents Registration Act of 1938, as amended.
S. 305	February 7, 2023	250th Anniversary of the United States Marine Corps Commemorative Coin Act	To require the Secretary of the Treasury to mint coins in commemoration of the 250th anniversary of the United States Marine Corps, and to support programs at the Marine Corps Heritage Center.
S. 316	February 9, 2023	(No short title)	To repeal the authorizations for use of military force against Iraq.
S. 349	February 9, 2023	Military Spouse Employment Act	To amend title 5, United States Code, to authorize the appointment of spouses of members of the Armed Forces who are on active duty, disabled, or deceased to positions in which the spouses will work remotely.
S. 376	February 9, 2023	(No short title)	To designate the area between the intersections of 16th Street, Northwest and Fuller Street, Northwest and 16th Street, Northwest and Euclid Street, Northwest in Washington, District of Columbia, as "Oswaldo Payá Way".
S. 418	February 14, 2023	Justice for Jana Elementary Act of 2023	To provide financial assistance to schools impacted by radioactive contaminants, and for other purposes.
S. 475	February 16, 2023	(No short title)	To designate the clinic of the Department of Veterans Affairs in Gallup, New Mexico, as the Hiroshi "Hershey" Miyamura VA Clinic.
S. 645	March 2, 2023	Fighting Post-Traumatic Stress Disorder Act of 2023	To require the Attorney General to propose a program for making treatment for post-traumatic stress disorder and acute stress disorder available to public safety officers, and for other purposes.
S. 659	March 6, 2023	Administrative False Claims Act of 2023	To amend chapter 38 of title 31, United States Code, relating to civil remedies, and for other purposes.
S. 724	March 8, 2023	Preventing Child Sex Abuse Act of 2023	To protect children against sexual abuse and exploitation, and for other purposes.
S. 758	March 9, 2023	Moving Americans Privacy Protection Act	To amend the Tariff Act of 1930 to protect personally identifiable information, and for other purposes.
S. 769	March 9, 2023	US Hostage and Wrongful Detainee Act of 2023	To amend title 36, United States Code, to designate March 9 as U.S. Hostage and Wrongful Detainee Day and to designate the Hostage and Wrongful Detainee flag as an official symbol to recognize citizens of the United States held as hostages or wrongfully detained abroad.
S. 829	March 16, 2023	Disclosing Foreign Influence in Lobbying Act	To amend the Lobbying Disclosure Act of 1995 to clarify a provision relating to certain contents of registrations under that Act.
S. 870	March 16, 2023	Fire Grants and Safety Act	To amend the Federal Fire Prevention and Control Act of 1974 to authorize appropriations for the United States Fire Administration and firefighter assistance grant programs.
S. 932	March 22, 2023	No CORRUPTION Act	To amend title 5, United States Code, to provide for the halt in pension payments for Members of Congress sentenced for certain offenses, and for other purposes.
S. 1096	March 30, 2023	Department of Veterans Affairs Office of Inspector General Training Act of 2023	To require the Secretary of Veterans Affairs to require the employees of the Department of Veterans Affairs to receive training developed by the Inspector General of the department on reporting wrongdoing to, responding to requests from, and cooperating with the Office of Inspector General of the department, and for other purposes.
S. 1311	April 26, 2023	Udall Foundation Reauthorization Act of 2023	A bill to reauthorize the Morris K. Udall and Stewart L. Udall Trust Fund, and for other purposes.
S. 1549	May 10, 2023	Congressional Budget Office Data Access Act	To provide the Congressional Budget Office with necessary authorities to expedite the sharing of data from executive branch agencies, and for other purposes.
S.J.Res. 9	February 7, 2023	(No short title)	Providing for congressional disapproval under chapter 8 of title 5, United States Code, of the rule submitted by the United States Fish and Wildlife Service relating to Endangered and Threatened Wildlife and Plants; Lesser Prairie-Chicken; Threatened Status With Section 4(d) Rule for the Northern Distinct Population Segment and Endangered Status for the Southern Distinct Population Segment.
S.J.Res. 18	March 8, 2023	(No short title)	Disapproving of the rule submitted by the Department of Homeland Security relating to "Public Charge Ground of Inadmissibility".
S.J.Res. 23	March 30, 2023	(No short title)	Providing for congressional disapproval under chapter 8 of title 5, United States Code, of the rule submitted by the National Marine Fisheries Service relating to "Endangered and Threatened Wildlife and Plants; Regulations for Listing Endangered and Threatened Species and Designating Critical Habitat".
S.J.Res. 24	March 30, 2023	(No short title)	Providing for congressional disapproval under chapter 8 of title 5, United States Code, of the rule submitted by the United States Fish and Wildlife Service relating to "Endangered and Threatened Wildlife and Plants; Endangered Species Status for Northern Long-Eared Bat".

=== Passed by the Senate, no House consent needed ===
S. number	Date of introduction	Description
S.Res. 1	January 3, 2023	A resolution establishing a Committee to Inform the President of the United States that a quorum of each House is assembled.
S.Res. 2	January 3, 2023	A resolution informing the House of Representatives that a quorum of the Senate is assembled.
S.Res. 3	January 3, 2023	A resolution to elect Patty Murray, a Senator from the State of Washington, to be president pro tempore of the Senate of the United States.
S.Res. 4	January 3, 2023	A resolution notifying the President of the United States of the election of a President pro tempore.
S.Res. 5	January 3, 2023	A resolution notifying the House of Representatives of the election of a President pro tempore.
S.Res. 6	January 3, 2023	A resolution fixing the hour of daily meeting of the Senate.
S.Res. 8	January 3, 2023	A resolution to make effective appointment of Senate Legal Counsel.
S.Res. 9	January 3, 2023	A resolution to make effective appointment of Deputy Senate Legal Counsel.
S.Res. 11	January 23, 2023	A resolution designating the week of January 22 through January 28, 2023, as "National School Choice Week".
S.Res. 13	January 25, 2023	Raising awareness and encouraging the prevention of stalking by designating January 2023 as “National Stalking Awareness Month”.
S.Res. 16	January 26, 2023	A resolution congratulating the University of Georgia Bulldogs football team for winning the 2023 National Collegiate Athletic Association College Football National Championship.
S.Res. 17	January 26, 2023	A resolution supporting the contributions of Catholic schools in the United States.
S.Res. 21	February 1, 2023	A resolution supporting the observation of National Trafficking and Modern Slavery Prevention Month during the period beginning on January 1, 2023, and ending on February 1, 2023, to raise awareness of, and opposition to, human trafficking and modern slavery.
S.Res. 22	February 1, 2023	A resolution congratulating the South Dakota State University Jackrabbits on winning the 2023 National Collegiate Athletic Association Division I Football Championship Subdivision title.
S.Res. 27	February 2, 2023	A resolution designating February 1, 2023 as "Blue Star Mother's Day".
S.Res. 28	February 2, 2023	A resolution commemorating the 20-year anniversary of the loss of Space Shuttle Columbia.
S.Res. 29	February 2, 2023	A resolution designating the week beginning February 5, 2023, as "National Tribal Colleges and Universities Week".
S.Res. 30	February 2, 2023	A resolution to constitute the majority party's membership on certain committees for the One Hundred Eighteenth Congress, or until their successors are chosen.
S.Res. 31	February 2, 2023	A resolution to constitute the minority party's membership on certain committees for the One Hundred Eighteenth Congress, or until their successors are chosen.

=== Other legislation ===
Due to size constraints, this list only includes bills that have been considered by a committee.

S. number	Date of introduction	Short title	Long title
S.5384	November 21, 2024	Returning Education to Our States Act	A bill to abolish the Department of Education, and for other purposes.
S.J.Res 121	December 12, 2024	(No short title)	A joint resolution proposing an amendment to the Constitution of the United States to abolish the electoral college and to provide for the direct election of the President and Vice President of the United States.

== See also ==
- List of acts of the 118th United States Congress
- Procedures of the U.S. Congress
- List of United States federal legislation
- List of executive actions by Joe Biden
