= National Defense Authorization Act for Fiscal Year 2024 =

United States federal law

- Long title: An Act to authorize appropriations for fiscal year 2024 for military activities of the Department of Defense and for military construction, and for defense activities of the Department of Energy, to prescribe military personnel strengths for such fiscal year, and for other purposes.
- Acronyms (colloquial): NDAA
- Enacted by: the 118th United States Congress

Citations
- Public law: Pub. L. 118–31 (text) (PDF)

Legislative history
- Introduced in the House as H.R. 2670 by Mike Rogers (R–AL) on April 18, 2023; Committee consideration by House Armed Services; Passed the House on July 14, 2023 (219–210); Passed the Senate on July 27, 2023 (with an amendment by unanimous consent); Reported by the joint conference committee on December 6, 2023; agreed to by the Senate on December 13, 2023 (87–13) and by the House on December 14, 2023 (310–118); Signed into law by President Joe Biden on December 22, 2023

The National Defense Authorization Act for Fiscal Year 2024 (NDAA 2024) is a United States federal law which specifies the budget, expenditures, and policies of the U.S. Department of Defense (DOD) for fiscal year 2024.

The newly added section 1250A of the act prohibits the President from withdrawing the United States from NATO without congressional approval, making it the first statute ever explicitly banning unilateral withdrawal from a treaty.

== Background ==
The National Defense Authorization Act is an annual bill proposed in the United States Congress that redefines the United States military budget for the following fiscal year. Each chamber of Congress introduced a version of the NDAA: H.R. 2670 in the House and S. 2226 in the Senate.

== History ==
The House passed their version on July 14, 2023 by a vote of 219–210. Led by Chuck Schumer and Mike Rounds, the Senate passed theirs on July 27, 2023 by a vote of 86–11. The Senate then replaced H.R. 2670 with the text of S. 2226 and passed it by unanimous consent, and indefinitely postponed S. 2226. The House disagreed to the Senate amendment and asked to hold conference on September 19, with the Senate insisting on its amendment and agreeing to conference on November 15. The subsequent conference report was filed on December 6 (H. Rept. 118-301). The bill was approved by the Senate and House and sent to President Joe Biden on December 14. Biden signed it into law on December 22. In his signing statement, Biden expressed reservations about provisions that restrict the executive branch's discretion in Guantanamo detainee transfers and raised constitutional concerns regarding congressional oversight and foreign policy authority.

== Provisions ==
=== NATO withdrawal ===
Section 1250A (22 U.S.C. § 1928f) prevents the President from withdrawing the United States from NATO without the approval of a two-thirds Senate supermajority or an act of Congress.

=== Unidentified flying objects (UFOs) ===
Sections 1841 et seq. outline the creation and management of a comprehensive collection of government records on UFOs or unidentified anomalous phenomena (UAP) at the National Archives (NARA), detailing the processes for assembling, preserving, and providing public access to these records, along with specific protocols for their review, disclosure, and secure handling. NARA subsequently provided guidance to federal agencies to identify, organize, and disclose UAP records for the new collection.

Sections 1687 and 7343 disallow use of funds or independent research and development (IRAD) indirect expenses for UFOs or UAP unless such material and information is made available the appropriate congressional committees and congressional leadership.

Language on the topic of UFO/UAP was also included in the previous 2023 NDAA (e.g. 50 U.S.C. § 3373b), the 2022 NDAA (e.g. 50 U.S.C. § 3373), the Intelligence Authorization Act for Fiscal Year 2022 (e.g. 50 U.S.C. § 3373a), as well as an accompanying Senate Select Committee on Intelligence report for the Intelligence Authorization Act for Fiscal Year 2021 (i.e. S. Rept. 116-233).

The provisions are also known as the UAP Disclosure Act of 2023. From the original proposal, several measures have been stripped, including the Federal Government's exercise of eminent domain over UAP-related material controlled by private persons or entities. The remaining provisions have been described by journalists covering the subject as a heavily watered down version of the act. See § UAP Disclosure Act below.

In 2026, President Trump said he would order agencies to begin the process of identifying and releasing files related to alien and extraterrestrial life, unidentified aerial phenomena (UAP), and unidentified flying objects (UFOs).

=== Foreign Extortion Prevention Act ===
The Foreign Extortion Prevention Act (FEPA) enables US authorities to prosecute foreign officials who demand or accept bribes from a US citizen, US company, or within a US jurisdiction. Analysts stated that FEPA addresses a longstanding gap in US anti-bribery legislation by tackling the "demand" side of bribery. At the same time, the Foreign Corrupt Practices Act (FCPA) focuses on the "supply" side of bribery.

=== Counter-extremist working group defunded ===
Republicans vigorously opposed the anti-extremism working group created by Secretary of Defense Lloyd Austin. That working group had been created by Austin after it became apparent that some service members and veterans had participated in the attack on the US Capitol on January 6, 2021. That working group released recommendations at the end of 2021. Implementation, however, appeared to stall as Republicans increasingly opposed diversity, equity, and inclusion efforts in the military, which Republicans derided as "wokeness".

Meanwhile, a recent inspector general report found dozens of troops, who appeared to be advocating violent overthrow of the US government.

The seriousness of this issue seems apparent from the fact that military and veterans have participated in other violent extremist events. For example, the Oklahoma City bomber, Timothy McVeigh, had served with distinction in Operation Desert Storm but had earned a reputation as a sergeant for assigning undesirable work to black servicemen and using derogatory language.

== Original proposals ==
The original House bill contained provisions to:

- Space Force Personnel Management Act: Disestablish the regular Space Force in order to integrate both active duty and reserve personnel into one Space Force entity. This is to allow for better flexibility for the Space Force by replacing "active duty" with "sustained duty" or "full-time" status, and replacing "reserve" with "part-time" status. This change would only pertain to the Space Force and not to the other armed services.
- Elevate the position of vice chief of the National Guard Bureau to hold a statutory rank of general.
- Permanently establish the titles of commissioned officer ranks of the Space Force to be the same as the Army, Marine Corps, and Air Force.
- Authorize a $886 billion spending budget for national defense programs including:
  - A 5.2% pay increase for service members of the armed forces.
  - Procurement of up to 13 Virginia-class submarines.
- Authorize the sale and transfer of defense articles and services relating to the implementation of the AUKUS partnership, including:
  - Up to three Virginia-class submarines, one year after this act is passed, however the Navy doesn't intend implement this until 2032.

The Senate amendment contained:

- UAP Disclosure Act: The Unidentified Anomalous Phenomena Disclosure Act of 2023 would direct the National Archives and Records Administration to collect and disclose records on unidentified flying objects (UFOs) or unidentified anomalous phenomena (UAP) no later than 25 years after enactment with a presumption of immediate disclosure. The U.S. president can certify that continued postponement can be made necessary by an identifiable harm to military defense, intelligence operations, law enforcement or conduct of foreign relations. The federal government would have eminent domain over recovered technologies of unknown origin (TUO) and biological evidence of non-human intelligence (NHI) that may be controlled by private persons or entities, such as aerospace companies. Legislation was necessary in part because UAP records had not been subject to mandatory declassification review due to exemptions under the Atomic Energy Act of 1954 as well as an over-broad interpretation of "transclassified foreign nuclear information".
- The Intelligence Authorization Act (IAA) requires people currently or formerly under contract with the federal government to make all UFO/UAP material and information and a comprehensive list of all extraterrestrial or exotic UAP material available to the All-domain Anomaly Resolution Office (AARO).
- A provision that prevents the President of the United States from withdrawing the U.S. from NATO without approval of a two-thirds Senate supermajority or an act of Congress.
