= Commemorative legislation =

The United States Congress routinely passes commemorative legislation. These bills are largely ceremonial, and are designed to honor individuals, groups and causes. According to the Pew Research Center, between the 101st and 115th congress, ceremonial bills made up between 11% and 39% of all enacted federal legislation, depending on the congress. Kinds of commemorative legislation include issuing commemorative coins, awarding the Congressional Gold Medal, and various kinds of observances. The height of commemorative legislation occurred during the 99th congress (1985-1986), during which about 41% of all public laws were commemorative. Statistical analysis has found a significant correlation between the passage of fewer substantive laws and the passage of more commemorative legislation, particularly during periods of policy gridlock.

== Types ==
=== Congressional Gold Medal ===
Congressional Gold Medals, which are currently awarded by passing an Act of Congress, have been issued since 1776.

=== Commemorative coins ===
The United States Mint has issued many commemorative coins by Act of Congress. The United States Commemorative Coin Act of 1996 limits the number of commemorative coins that could be authorized to two per year, starting in 1998. The sale of commemorative coins usually generates enough revenue for the Treasury to cover the expense of minting coins. However, since a surcharge on the coins usually raises several million dollars and passed along to the groups being commemorated, the practice has been criticized as a kind of earmark. The American 5-Cent Coin Design Continuity Act of 2003 requires the proceeds from commemorative coin sales to be matched by private donations before they are sent to the target organization.

=== Observances ===
One kind of commemorative law is designating some period of time in honor of a person or group of people. The first observance of this type was for Mother's Day in 1914, followed by Child Health Day in 1928. By 1990, (during the 101st congress) the number of such observances had increased substantially, drawing criticism. As a way to limit the amount of commemorative legislation, since the 104th congress (1995-1996) each session the house of representatives has adopted House rule XII, clause 5, which prohibits time-based commemorative legislation. Since the adoption of this rule, several thousand commemorative measures have been introduced, usually by suspension of the rules. However, most of these observances are now presented as non-binding resolutions. Many observances passed as legislation are codified in Chapter 1 of Title 36 of the United States Code.

=== Renamings ===
Since 1967, a popular kind of bill has been naming individual United States Post Offices, which entail the creation of a small plaque with the new name of the post office, and an unveiling ceremony. The post office bills have been criticized for the time required to pass them, but remain a popular, usually uncontroversial kind of bill, sometimes making up a significant portion of federal legislation. Beyond post offices, the United States Congress also passes legislation to officially name other buildings such as Veterans Health Administration clinics, or natural features such as mountain ridges.

== Binding versus non-binding resolutions ==
To be legally binding, house bills and senate bills (usually abbreviated H.R. or S.R.) must be signed by both chambers and signed into law by the president. On the other hand, simple resolutions are usually passed as a House Resolution or Senate Resolution (usually abbreviated as H.Res. or S.Res. respectively), and are not forwarded to the other chamber of congress. These simple resolutions are never legally binding, but are often used to signal approval or disapproval.

Some types of congressional observances do not require passing text at all, such as United States Capitol Flag Program.
