= Foreign Extortion Prevention Act =

United States federal law

- Acronyms (colloquial): FEPA
- Enacted by: the 118th United States Congress

Legislative history
- Signed into law by President Joe Biden on December 22, 2023

The Foreign Extortion Prevention Act (FEPA) is a United States federal law that enables US authorities to prosecute foreign officials who demand or accept bribes from a US citizen, US company, or within a US jurisdiction. FEPA was signed into law by Joe Biden on December 22, 2023, as part of the National Defense Authorization Act for Fiscal Year 2024.

Analysts stated that FEPA addresses a longstanding gap in US anti-bribery legislation by tackling the "demand" side of bribery. At the same time, the Foreign Corrupt Practices Act (FCPA) focuses on the "supply" side of bribery.

One expert noted that FEPA is "probably the most important U.S. anti-bribery effort since the FCPA itself became law. The law amends the federal domestic bribery statute to add a new subsection punishing foreign government officials for demanding or receiving a bribe. The law is quite specific in that it is intended to be extraterritorial in nature. This means that demanding or receiving a bribe, even if done somewhere else, is now a crime punishable in the United States."

== See also ==
- United Nations Convention Against Corruption
- OECD Anti-Bribery Convention
