= COVID-19 Origin Act of 2023 =

American Act of Congress

- Long title: To require the Director of National Intelligence to declassify information relating to the origin of COVID-19, and for other purposes.
- Enacted by: the 118th United States Congress

Citations
- Public law: Pub. L. 118–2 (text) (PDF)
- Statutes at Large: 137 Stat. 4

Legislative history
- Introduced in the Senate as S. 619 by Josh Hawley (R–MO) on March 1, 2023; Passed the Senate on March 1, 2023 (unanimous consent); Passed the House on March 10, 2023 (419–0); Signed into law by President Joe Biden on March 20, 2023

The COVID-19 Origin Act as it passed the Senate

The COVID-19 Origin Act of 2023 is an Act of Congress that required the Director of National Intelligence to declassify information relating to potential links between the Wuhan Institute of Virology (WIV) and the origin of the coronavirus disease 2019 (COVID-19) no later than 90 days after enactment, which took place on March 29, 2023.

The Biden administration released a report on June 23. The declassified report rejected several key arguments made by lab leak theory proponents in the weeks leading up to the declassification. The report stated that the intelligence community remains divided, with the overall assessment from most intelligence assets (and the National Intelligence Council) being (with low confidence) that the pandemic is most likely of zoonotic origin unrelated to a laboratory leak. With regards to genetic engineering of SARS-CoV-2 and similar bioweapons-related hypotheses, the report said there was near universal agreement that these had not occurred. The report went on to indicate that the US intelligence community "has no information... indicating that any WIV genetic engineering work has involved SARS-CoV-2, a close progenitor, or a backbone virus that is closely related enough to have been the source of the pandemic."
