= Raise the Wage Act =

Proposed United States law

Raise the Wage Act of 2023
- Long title: To provide for increases in the Federal minimum wage, and for other purposes.
- Announced in: the 118th United States Congress
- Number of co-sponsors: 168

Legislative history
- Introduced in the House of Representatives as H.R.4889 by Bobby Scott (D–VA) on June 25, 2023; Committee consideration by House Committee on Education and Labor

The Raise the Wage Act is a proposed United States law that would increase the federal minimum wage to US$17. Versions of the bill have been introduced in each United States Congress since 2017.

== Provisions ==
=== Minimum Wage Increases ===
The most recently introduced bill would gradually increase the minimum wage over the 5 years following the bill's passage and ultimately eliminate sub-minimum wages for tipped, disabled, and youth workers. Additionally, once wages reach $17.00/hr, the minimum wage will be pegged to median wage growth so as to prevent the value of the minimum wage from decreasing.

Regular Employees
Effective Date	New Minimum Wage
The next year on January 1	$9.50
1 year later	$11.00
2 years later	$12.50
3 years later	$14.00
4 years later	$15.50
5 years later	$17.00

Employees with Disabilities
Effective Date	New Minimum Wage
The next year on January 1	$5.00
1 year later	$7.50
2 years later	$10.00
3 years later	$12.50
4 years later	$15.50
5 years later	$17.00

Tipped Employees
Effective Date	New Minimum Wage
The next year on January 1	$6.00
1 year later	$8.00
2 years later	$10.00
3 years later	$12.00
4 years later	$13.50
5 years later	$15.00
6 years later	$17.00

Employees Under 20 Years Old
Effective Date	New Minimum Wage
The next year on January 1	$6.00
1 year later	$7.75
2 years later	$9.50
3 years later	$11.25
4 years later	$13.50
5 years later	$13.00
6 years later	$16.50
7 years later	$17.00

== Legislative history ==
As of November 17, 2026:

Congress	Short title	Bill number(s)	Date introduced	Sponsor(s)	# of cosponsors	Latest status
115th Congress	Raise the Wage Act	H.R. 15	May 25, 2017	Bobby Scott (D-VA)	171	Died in committee
115th Congress	Raise the Wage Act	S. 1242	May 25, 2017	Bernie Sanders (I-VT)	31	Died in committee
116th Congress	Raise the Wage Act	H.R. 582	January 16, 2019	Bobby Scott (D-VA)	205	Passed the House (231-199)
116th Congress	Raise the Wage Act	S. 150	January 16, 2019	Bernie Sanders (I-VT)	32	Died in committee
117th Congress	Raise the Wage Act of 2021	H.R. 603	January 28, 2021	Bobby Scott (D-VA)	202	Died in committee
117th Congress	Raise the Wage Act of 2021	S. 53	January 26, 2021	Bernie Sanders (I-VT)	37	Died in committee
118th Congress	Raise the Wage Act of 2023	H.R. 4889	July 25, 2023	Bobby Scott (D-VA)	172	Referred to Committees of Jurisdiction
118th Congress	Raise the Wage Act of 2023	S. 2488	July 25, 2023	Bernie Sanders (I-VT)	31	Referred to Committees of Jurisdiction
119th Congress	Raise the Wage Act of 2025	H.R. 2743	April 8, 2025	Bobby Scott (D-VA)	165	Referred to Committees of Jurisdiction
119th Congress	Raise the Wage Act of 2025	S. 1332	April 8, 2025	Bernie Sanders (I-VT)	33	Referred to Committees of Jurisdiction

== See also ==
- List of bills in the 115th United States Congress
- List of bills in the 116th United States Congress
- List of bills in the 117th United States Congress
- List of bills in the 118th United States Congress
- Minimum wage
