= FAMILY Act =

- Long title: To provide paid family and medical leave benefits to certain individuals, and for other purposes.
- Announced in: the 118th United States Congress
- Number of co-sponsors: 173

Legislative history
- Introduced in the House of Representatives as H.R. 3481 by Rosa DeLauro (D–CT) on May 18, 2023; Committee consideration by Ways and Means

The Family and Medical Insurance Leave (FAMILY) Act is a proposed United States law that would provide paid family and medical leave benefits to certain individuals who meet requirements specified in the bill.

== Legislative history ==
As of September 16, 2025 :

Congress	Short title	Bill number(s)	Date introduced	Sponsor(s)	# of cosponsors	Latest status
113th Congress	Family and Medical Insurance Leave Act of 2013	H.R. 3712	December 12, 2013	Rosa DeLauro (D-CT)	101	Died in Committee
113th Congress	Family and Medical Insurance Leave Act of 2013	S. 1810	December 12, 2013	Kirsten Gillibrand (D-NY)	6	Died in Committee
114th Congress	Family and Medical Insurance Leave Act	H.R. 1439	March 18, 2015	Rosa DeLauro (D-CT)	137	Died in Committee
114th Congress	Family and Medical Insurance Leave Act	S. 786	March 18, 2015	Kirsten Gillibrand (D-NY)	21	Died in Committee
115th Congress	FAMILY Act	H.R. 847	February 7, 2017	Rosa DeLauro (D-CT)	160	Died in Committee
115th Congress	FAMILY Act	S. 337	February 7, 2017	Kirsten Gillibrand (D-NY)	34	Died in Committee
116th Congress	FAMILY Act	H.R. 1185	February 13, 2019	Rosa DeLauro (D-CT)	219	Died in Committee
116th Congress	FAMILY Act	S. 463	February 12, 2019	Kirsten Gillibrand (D-NY)	36	Died in Committee
117th Congress	FAMILY Act	H.R. 804	February 4, 2021	Rosa DeLauro (D-CT)	207	Died in Committee
117th Congress	FAMILY Act	S. 248	February 4, 2021	Kirsten Gillibrand (D-NY)	37	Died in Committee
118th Congress	FAMILY Act	H.R.3481	May 18, 2023	Rosa DeLauro (D-CT)	152	Died in Committee
118th Congress	FAMILY Act	S.1714	May 18, 2023	Kirsten Gillibrand (D-NY)	35	Died in Committee
118th Congress	FAMILY Act	H.R.5390	September 16, 2025	Rosa DeLauro (D-CT)	208	Referred to committee
118th Congress	FAMILY Act	S.2823	September 16, 2025	Kirsten Gillibrand (D-NY)	38	Referred to committee

== See also ==
- List of bills in the 115th United States Congress
- List of bills in the 116th United States Congress
- List of bills in the 117th United States Congress
