= Family and Small Business Taxpayer Protection Act =

Proposed taxation legislation

- Long title: To rescind certain balances made available to the Internal Revenue Service.
- Announced in: the 118th United States Congress
- Number of co-sponsors: 82

Codification
- Acts affected: Inflation Reduction Act of 2022

Legislative history
- Introduced in the House of Representatives as H.R. 23 by Adrian Smith (R–NE) on January 9, 2023; Committee consideration by House Ways and Means; Passed the House on January 9, 2023 (221–210)

The Family and Small Business Taxpayer Protection Act is a proposed United States law that would rescind the expansion of the Internal Revenue Service included in the Inflation Reduction Act of 2022. It was the first bill to be introduced in the 118th Congress.

Proponents of the bill, the Congressional Republicans, claim that the bill is necessary to protect middle-class Americans from increased audits and scrutiny from the IRS and hold the institution accountable. Opponents of the bill, Congressional Democrats and President Joe Biden, claim that the bill would allow higher-income Americans to avoid paying taxes and would increase the national debt.

The Fiscal Responsibility Act of 2023 includes a provision that is based on this proposed act, rescinding $1.4 billion of the IRS expansion introduced by the Inflation Reduction Act.

It was previously introduced in the 117th Congress.
