= See Something, Say Something Online Act =

Purposed U.S law

- Long title: To require reporting of suspicious transmissions in order to assist in criminal investigations and counterintelligence activities relating to international terrorism, and for other purposes.
- Announced in: the 118th United States Congress
- Number of co-sponsors: 1

Legislative history
- Introduced in the Senate as S.147 by Joe Manchin (D–WV) on January 30, 2023; Committee consideration by United States Senate Committee on Commerce, Science, and Transportation

The See Something, Say Something Online Act is a proposed United States law that would require reporting of suspicious transmissions in order to assist in criminal investigations and counterintelligence activities such as international terrorism.

== Background ==
Lawmakers have expressed frustration with the perceived inability or unwillingness of major tech companies to consistently report harmful user content linked to terrorism, drug trafficking, and violent extremism that may pose a threat to public safety or national security.

The bill draws inspiration from the Bank Secrecy Act (BSA), which mandates financial institutions to file Suspicious Activity Reports (SARs) when they detect potential financial crimes. Similarly, the legislation proposes a standardized reporting system: Suspicious Transmission Activity Reports (STARs), to help online service providers quickly alert law enforcement to potentially dangerous activity.

This bill is part of broader efforts in Congress to reevaluate the scope of Section 230 of the Communications Decency Act, which provides broad legal immunity to online platforms for content posted by their users. The Department of Justice has concluded that changes in technology and broad court interpretations have allowed platforms to claim sweeping immunity while moderating content with minimal transparency.

== Provisions ==
The provisions of the bill establish mandatory reporting requirements for online service providers to report suspicious transmissions related to major crimes, create a standardized reporting system (STARs), improve coordination between law enforcement and tech companies, and remove liability protections for platforms that fail to report such activities.

- It mandates that providers of interactive computer services submit a Suspicious Transmission Activity Report (STAR) to the Department of Justice if they detect or are notified of user-generated content that may facilitate, promote, or incite major crimes. Reports must be filed within 30 days of detection, with immediate notification required for threats such as active drug sales or imminent terrorist activity.
- The Attorney General is required to establish a process for submitting STARs, including designating or creating an agency within the Department of Justice to receive and manage these reports. This agency must also create a centralized online resource for public reporting of suspicious activity, coordination with law enforcement, and providing training to both enforcement agencies and online platforms.
- Interactive service providers must retain STARs and supporting records for five years, make them available to law enforcement upon request, and take appropriate action against reported accounts unless otherwise instructed by authorities. Disclosure of STARs or their existence to third parties is generally prohibited to preserve investigation integrity.
- The Attorney General is authorized to distribute STARs and public reports to appropriate federal, state, and local agencies for law enforcement purposes, including U.S. intelligence agencies and organizations like the National Center for Missing and Exploited Children.
- Failure to report a known suspicious transmission removes liability protections otherwise granted under Section 230 of the Communications Act. Service providers that do not comply may be held civilly or criminally liable and treated as the publisher of the suspicious content in question.

The legislation also exempts STARs from Freedom of Information Act (FOIA) requests and authorizes appropriations as necessary to carry out the Act.

== Legislative history ==
Congress	Short title	Bill number(s)	Date introduced	Sponsor(s)	# of cosponsors	Latest status
116th Congress	See Something, Say Something Online Act of 2020	S. 4758	August 29, 2020	Joe Manchin(D-WV)	1	Died in Committee
117th Congress	See Something, Say Something Online Act of 2021	S. 27	January 22, 2021	Joe Manchin(D-WV)	1	Referred to Committees of Jurisdiction.
118th Congress	See Something, Say Something Online Act of 2023	S. 147	January 30, 2023	Joe Manchin(D-WV)	1	Referred to Committees of Jurisdiction.

== See also ==
- List of bills in the 116th United States Congress
- List of bills in the 117th United States Congress
- Metropolitan Transportation Authority § Safety campaign—The origin of the slogan "If you see something, say something."
