= Workplace Violence Prevention for Health Care and Social Service Workers Act =

US bill

- Long title: To direct the Secretary of Labor to issue an occupational safety and health standard that requires covered employers within the health care and social service industries to develop and implement a comprehensive workplace violence prevention plan, and for other purposes.
- Announced in: the 118th United States Congress
- Number of co-sponsors: 172

Legislative history
- Introduced in the House of Representatives as H.R. 2663 by Joe Courtney (D–CT) on April 18, 2023; Committee consideration by Energy and Commerce and Ways and Means

The Workplace Violence Prevention for Health Care and Social Services Workers Act is a proposed United States law that would require the Department of Labor to address workplace violence in health care, social service and other sectors.

== Provisions ==
The bill requires the Department of Labor to address workplace violence in health care, social service, and other related sectors.

Additionally the Department of Labor must issue an interim occupational safety and health standard that requires certain employers to take actions to protect workers and other personnel from workplace violence. This standard would apply to employers in the health care sector, in the social service sector, and in sectors that conduct activities similar to those in the health care and social service sectors.

== Legislative history ==
As of September 27, 2022:

Congress	Short title	Bill number(s)	Date introduced	Sponsor(s)	# of cosponsors	Latest status
115th Congress	Workplace Violence Prevention for Health Care and Social Service Workers Act	H.R. 7141	November 16, 2018	Joe Courtney (D-CT)	23	Died in Committee.
116th Congress	Workplace Violence Prevention for Health Care and Social Service Workers Act	H.R. 1309	February 19, 2019	Joe Courtney (D-CT)	228	Passed in the House (251-158)
116th Congress	Workplace Violence Prevention for Health Care and Social Service Workers Act	S. 851	March 14, 2021	Tammy Baldwin (D-WI)	31	Died in Committee.
117th Congress	Workplace Violence Prevention for Health Care and Social Service Workers Act	H.R. 1195	February 22, 2021	Joe Courtney (D-CT)	145	Passed in the House (254-166)
117th Congress	Workplace Violence Prevention for Health Care and Social Service Workers Act	S.4182	May 11, 2022	Tammy Baldwin (D-WI)	35	Referred to committees of jurisdiction.
118th Congress	Workplace Violence Prevention for Health Care and Social Service Workers Act	H.R. 2663	April 18, 2023	Joe Courtney (D-CT)	172	Referred to committees of jurisdiction.
118th Congress	Workplace Violence Prevention for Health Care and Social Service Workers Act	S.1176	April 18, 2023	Tammy Baldwin (D-WI)	37	Referred to committees of jurisdiction.

== See also ==
- Workplace violence
