= Women's Health Protection Act =

Proposed US legislation

- Long title: An Act to protect a person's ability to determine whether to continue or end a pregnancy, and to protect a health care provider's ability to provide abortion services.
- Acronyms (colloquial): WHPA

Legislative history
- Introduced in the House as H.R. 12 by Judy Chu (D–CA) on June 24, 2025; Committee consideration by House Energy and Commerce

The Women's Health Protection Act (H.R. 12) is a piece of legislation introduced in the United States House of Representatives, aimed at expanding abortion rights established in Roe v. Wade (1973) and Planned Parenthood v. Casey (1992). It was first introduced in 2013 by Congresswoman Judy Chu and sponsored by Senator Richard Blumenthal. In the 117th Congress, the act was re-introduced in response to Whole Woman's Health v. Jackson and later Dobbs v. Jackson Women's Health Organization. In September 2021, it passed the House of Representatives by a vote of 218–211, and again by a vote of 219–210 in July 2022, but it was defeated in the Senate on a 46–48 vote in February 2022 and a 49–51 vote in May 2022.

Among key facets of the bill include preventing state and local governments from regulating abortions before fetal viability, or when the mother's life or health is at risk after fetal viability, and preventing government from restricting access to abortion services unless a compelling state interest has been shown in such restrictions. Violations would be investigated and prosecuted by the Department of Justice.

== Legislative history ==
As of November 22, 2026:

Congress	Short title	Bill number(s)	Date introduced	Sponsor(s)	# of cosponsors	Latest status
113th Congress	Women's Health Protection Act of 2013	H.R. 3471	November 11, 2013	Judy Chu (D-CA)	132	Died in committee.
113th Congress	Women's Health Protection Act of 2013	S. 1696	November 11, 2013	Richard Blumenthal (D-CT)	35	Died in committee.
114th Congress	Women's Health Protection Act of 2015	H.R. 448	January 21, 2015	Judy Chu (D-CA)	146	Died in committee.
114th Congress	Women's Health Protection Act of 2015	S. 217	January 21, 2015	Richard Blumenthal (D-CT)	35	Died in committee.
115th Congress	Women's Health Protection Act of 2017	H.R. 1322	March 2, 2017	Judy Chu (D-CA)	169	Died in committee.
115th Congress	Women's Health Protection Act of 2017	S. 510	March 2, 2017	Richard Blumenthal (D-CT)	42	Died in committee.
116th Congress	Women’s Health Protection Act of 2019	H.R. 2975	May 23, 2019	Judy Chu (D-CA)	217	Died in committee.
116th Congress	Women’s Health Protection Act of 2019	S. 1645	May 23, 2019	Richard Blumenthal (D-CT)	43	Died in committee.
117th Congress	Women's Health Protection Act of 2021	H.R. 3755	June 8, 2021	Judy Chu (D-CA)	215	Cloture not invoked (46-48).
117th Congress	Women's Health Protection Act of 2021	S. 1975	June 8, 2021	Richard Blumenthal (D-CT)	47	Referred to Committees of Jurisdiction.
117th Congress	Women's Health Protection Act of 2022	H.R. 8296	July 7, 2022	Judy Chu (D-CA)	3	Passed the House (219-210)
117th Congress	Women's Health Protection Act of 2022	S. 4132	May 3, 2022	Richard Blumenthal (D-CT)	0	Cloture not invoked (49-51).
118th Congress	Women’s Health Protection Act of 2023	H.R. 12	March 30, 2023	Judy Chu (D-CA)	215	Referred to Subcommittee on Health (April 7, 2023)
118th Congress	Women’s Health Protection Act of 2023	S. 701	March 8, 2023	Tammy Baldwin (D-WI)	49	Second reading (March 9, 2023)
119th Congress	Women’s Health Protection Act of 2025	H.R. 12	June 21, 2025	Judy Chu (D-CA)	207	Referred to Committees of Jurisdiction.
119th Congress	Women’s Health Protection Act of 2025	S. 2150	June 21, 2025	Tammy Baldwin (D-WI)	46	Referred to Committees of Jurisdiction.

== See also ==
- Abortion in the United States
- United States abortion-rights movement
