= Federal Death Penalty Abolition Act =

U.S. federal death penalty repeal bills

- Series of proposed federal bills
- Purpose: Abolition of the federal death penalty
- First introduced: November 10, 1999, as S. 1917
- Original sponsor: Russ Feingold
- Related title: Federal Death Penalty Prohibition Act
- Latest bills: 119th Congress: H.R. 8940 and S. 4608
- Latest introduction: May 20, 2026
- Status: Not enacted as of September 30, 2026

The Federal Death Penalty Abolition Act is the title of a series of bills introduced in the United States Congress since 1999 to abolish the federal death penalty. Related proposals have also been introduced under the title Federal Death Penalty Prohibition Act. The proposals would prohibit death sentences and executions for violations of federal law, but would not abolish capital punishment under state law.

== History ==
Senator Russ Feingold introduced the Federal Death Penalty Abolition Act of 1999 on November 10, 1999. He reintroduced the proposal in the Senate in 2001, 2003, 2005, 2007, and 2009.

In the House, Dennis Kucinich sponsored versions in 2003, 2006, 2008, and 2011. Donna Edwards introduced a version in 2013, and Adriano Espaillat introduced versions in 2019, 2021, and 2023.

In July 2019, Representative Ayanna Pressley and Senator Dick Durbin introduced related bills following the Justice Department's announcement that federal executions would resume. The Pressley and Durbin bills did not include a short title. Their successors were introduced as the Federal Death Penalty Prohibition Act in 2021 and 2023. Between 2001 and January 2021, the federal government executed 16 people, including 13 between July 2020 and January 2021.

On July 1, 2021, Attorney General Merrick Garland imposed a moratorium on federal executions pending a review of Justice Department policies and procedures. On December 23, 2024, President Joe Biden commuted the sentences of 37 of the 40 people on federal death row to life imprisonment without parole. Attorney General Pam Bondi lifted the moratorium on February 5, 2025. As of September 30, 2026, no federal executions have taken place since the moratorium was lifted.

Pressley and Durbin reintroduced the Federal Death Penalty Prohibition Act on May 20, 2026, as H.R. 8940 and S. 4608, respectively.

== Provisions ==
The proposals would prohibit federal death sentences and executions. Bills introduced under the Federal Death Penalty Abolition Act title include amendments removing death penalty provisions from individual federal statutes. The Federal Death Penalty Prohibition Act proposals use a general prohibition without those detailed amendments.

The 1999 Abolition bill proposed amendments to civilian criminal statutes and repeal of federal capital sentencing procedures. Early reintroductions retained this framework, including the 2006 House bill. The 2007 Senate bill added explicit amendments to the Uniform Code of Military Justice and military commission offenses and procedures. It also expanded the list of civilian statutes to be amended, including provisions concerning chemical weapons and war crimes. The 2009 Senate bill added an amendment to Article 56 of the Uniform Code of Military Justice expressly excluding death as a permitted punishment. The 2023 version revised the military amendments, including the statutory references for aiding the enemy, spying, and espionage.

The Abolition bills from 1999 through 2019 would have required people already sentenced to death under federal law to serve life imprisonment without the possibility of parole. The 2021 House Abolition bill instead called for resentencing without specifying a replacement sentence; subsequent Abolition and Prohibition bills have used the same approach.

== Legislative history ==
The table includes bills titled Federal Death Penalty Abolition Act and the related Federal Death Penalty Prohibition Act proposals, including the 2019 bills introduced by Pressley and Durbin, which had no short title. None have been enacted as of September 30, 2026. Cosponsor counts and statuses are current as of that date.

| Congress | Short title | Bill | Date introduced | Sponsor | Cosponsors | Latest status |
|---|---|---|---|---|---|---|
| 106th Congress | Federal Death Penalty Abolition Act of 1999 | S. 1917 | November 10, 1999 | Russell Feingold (D-WI) | 1 | Died in committee. |
| 107th Congress | Federal Death Penalty Abolition Act of 2001 | S. 191 | January 25, 2001 | Russell Feingold (D-WI) | 1 | Died in committee. |
| 108th Congress | Federal Death Penalty Abolition Act of 2003 | H.R. 2574 | June 24, 2003 | Dennis Kucinich (D-OH) | 46 | Died in committee. |
| 108th Congress | Federal Death Penalty Abolition Act of 2003 | S. 402 | February 13, 2003 | Russell Feingold (D-WI) | 0 | Died in committee. |
| 109th Congress | Federal Death Penalty Abolition Act | H.R. 4923 | March 9, 2006 | Dennis Kucinich (D-OH) | 45 | Died in committee. |
| 109th Congress | Federal Death Penalty Abolition Act of 2005 | S. 122 | January 24, 2005 | Russell Feingold (D-WI) | 0 | Died in committee. |
| 110th Congress | Federal Death Penalty Abolition Act of 2008 | H.R. 6875 | September 11, 2008 | Dennis Kucinich (D-OH) | 19 | Died in committee. |
| 110th Congress | Federal Death Penalty Abolition Act of 2007 | S. 447 | January 31, 2007 | Russell Feingold (D-WI) | 0 | Died in committee. |
| 111th Congress | Federal Death Penalty Abolition Act of 2009 | S. 650 | March 19, 2009 | Russell Feingold (D-WI) | 0 | Died in committee. |
| 112th Congress | Federal Death Penalty Abolition Act of 2011 | H.R. 3051 | September 23, 2011 | Dennis Kucinich (D-OH) | 15 | Died in committee. |
| 113th Congress | Federal Death Penalty Abolition Act of 2013 | H.R. 3741 | December 12, 2013 | Donna Edwards (D-MD) | 13 | Died in committee. |
| 116th Congress | Federal Death Penalty Abolition Act of 2019 | H.R. 4022 | July 25, 2019 | Adriano Espaillat (D-NY) | 67 | Died in committee. |
| 116th Congress | No short title | H.R. 4052 | July 25, 2019 | Ayanna Pressley (D-MA) | 65 | Died in committee. |
| 116th Congress | No short title | S. 2390 | July 31, 2019 | Richard Durbin (D-IL) | 16 | Died in committee. |
| 117th Congress | Federal Death Penalty Abolition Act of 2021 | H.R. 97 | January 4, 2021 | Adriano Espaillat (D-NY) | 85 | Died in committee. |
| 117th Congress | Federal Death Penalty Prohibition Act | H.R. 262 | January 11, 2021 | Ayanna Pressley (D-MA) | 79 | Died in committee. |
| 117th Congress | Federal Death Penalty Prohibition Act | S. 582 | March 3, 2021 | Richard Durbin (D-IL) | 20 | Died in committee. |
| 118th Congress | Federal Death Penalty Abolition Act of 2023 | H.R. 1124 | February 21, 2023 | Adriano Espaillat (D-NY) | 28 | Died in committee. |
| 118th Congress | Federal Death Penalty Prohibition Act | H.R. 4633 | July 13, 2023 | Ayanna Pressley (D-MA) | 61 | Died in committee. |
| 118th Congress | Federal Death Penalty Prohibition Act | S. 2299 | July 13, 2023 | Richard Durbin (D-IL) | 20 | Died in committee. |
| 119th Congress | Federal Death Penalty Prohibition Act | H.R. 8940 | May 20, 2026 | Ayanna Pressley (D-MA) | 30 | Referred to the House Committee on the Judiciary. |
| 119th Congress | Federal Death Penalty Prohibition Act | S. 4608 | May 20, 2026 | Richard Durbin (D-IL) | 17 | Referred to the Senate Committee on the Judiciary. |

== See also ==
- Capital punishment in the United States
- Capital punishment by country
- Crimes Act of 1790
- Eighth Amendment to the United States Constitution
- Furman v. Georgia
- Gregg v. Georgia
- Wrongful execution
