= 118th United States Congress =

2023–2025 meeting of U.S. legislature

←	117th	119th	→
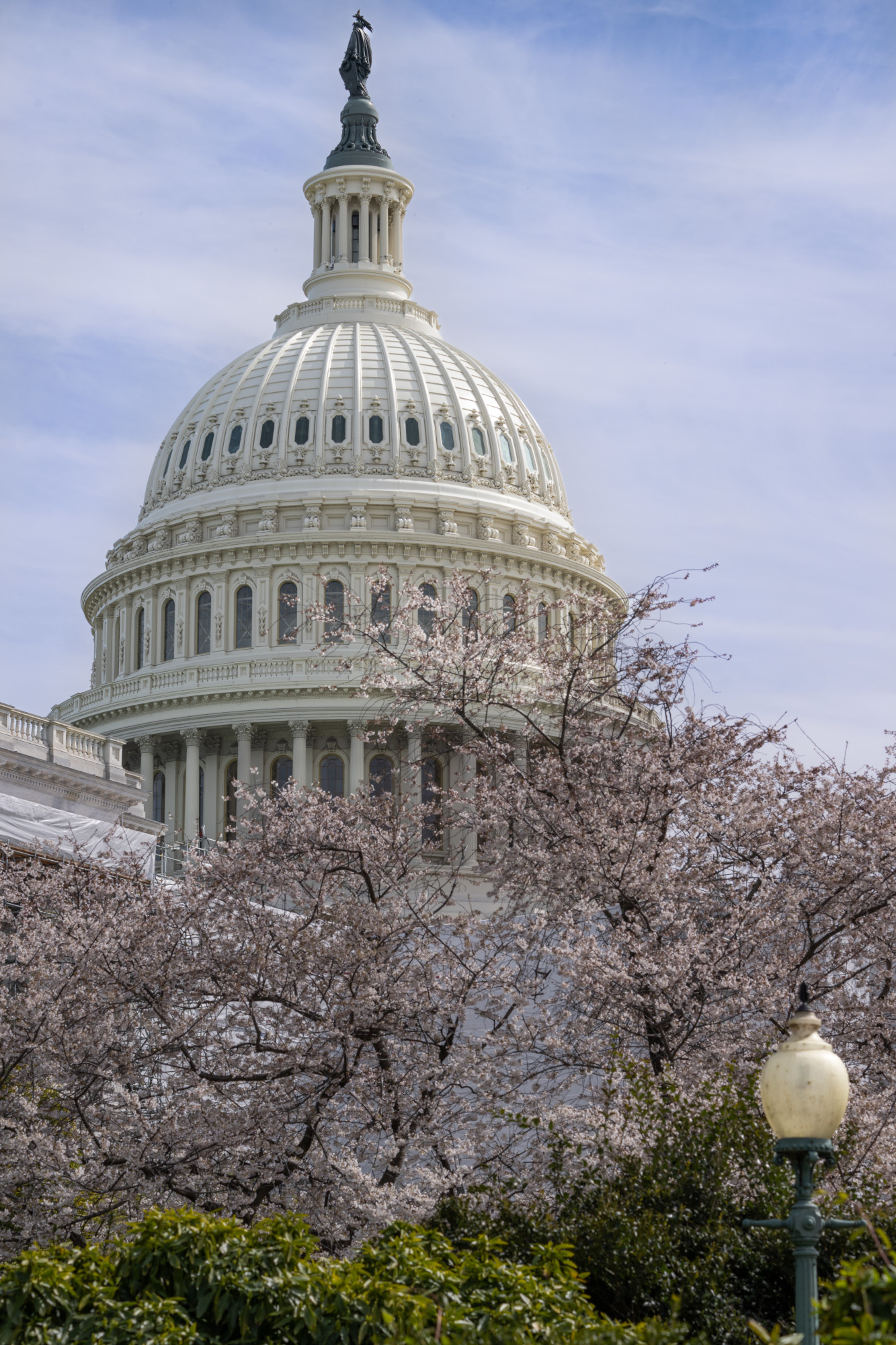
- United States Capitol (2023)

Overview
- Legislative body: United States Congress
- Jurisdiction: United States
- Term: January 3, 2023 – January 3, 2025

Senate
- Members: 100
- President: Kamala Harris (D)
- Party control: Democratic (through caucus)

House of Representatives
- Members: 435 representatives 6 non-voting delegates
- Speaker: Kevin McCarthy (R) (until October 3, 2023) (Note: Removed by a vote of the House.); Mike Johnson (R) (from October 25, 2023)
- Party control: Republican

Sessions
- 1st: January 3, 2023 – January 3, 2024
- 2nd: January 3, 2024 – January 3, 2025

118th Congress House member pin from both the 1st and 2nd session

The 118th United States Congress was a meeting of the legislative branch of the United States federal government, composed of the United States Senate and the United States House of Representatives. It convened in Washington, D.C., on January 3, 2023, and ended on January 3, 2025, during the final two years of Joe Biden's presidency.

In the 2022 midterm elections, the Republican Party won control of the House 222–213, taking the majority for the first time since the 115th Congress, while the Democratic Party gained one seat in the Senate, where they already had effective control, and giving them a 51–49-seat majority (with a caucus of 48 Democrats and three Independents). (Note: On May 31, 2024, Joe Manchin, a senator from West Virginia, left the Democratic Party and became an independent, but he continued to caucus with the Senate Democratic Caucus, as did the three other independent members of the Senate. Thus, the number of Independent senators increased to four, and the number of Democratic Party members decreased to forty-seven.) With Republicans winning the House, the 118th Congress ended the federal government trifecta Democrats held in the 117th.

This congress also featured the first female Senate president pro tempore (Patty Murray), the first black party leader (Hakeem Jeffries) in congressional history, and the longest-serving Senate party leaders (Mitch McConnell and Dick Durbin). (Note: McConnell has served as Senate Republican Leader since January 3, 2007, and Durbin has served as Senate Democratic Whip since January 3, 2005.) The Senate had the highest number of Independent members in a single Congress since the ratification of the 17th Amendment after Joe Manchin left the Democratic Party to become an independent.

The 118th Congress was characterized as a uniquely ineffectual Congress, with its most notable events pointing towards political dysfunction. The intense gridlock, particularly in the Republican-controlled House, where the Republican Conference's majority was often undercut by internal disputes among its members, resulted in it passing the lowest number of laws for the first year of session since the Richard Nixon administration, and possibly ever. By August 2024, the Congress has passed only 78 laws, less than a third of the next lowest laws per Congress in the 112th Congress, which also featured a Republican House opposing the Democratic Senate and White House. This resulted in the need for a legislative coalition to pass key legislation, allowing the minority to exercise powers usually reserved for the majority. The fractious session demotivated many veteran legislators, with five committee chairs among the dozens who declared their resignation or retirement before the end of the session, three of whom were eligible to reprise their positions if the Republican Party retained their majority for 2025. A higher-than-average number of retiring lawmakers were those attempting to pass bipartisan and collaborative legislation. Two complete discharge petitions were filed in late 2024, both Republican-led with majority Democratic support, demonstrating a trend towards bucking leadership and lack of party discipline; such a gambit was last successful in 2015 to support the Export–Import Bank. The second of these, a bill to remove certain Social Security restrictions, was subject to an unusual legislative procedure when a chair pro forma called forth a motion to table on a bill while the chamber was empty, flouting House convention and agreements.

The Congress began with a multi-ballot election for Speaker of the House, which had not happened since the 68th Congress in 1923. Kevin McCarthy was eventually elected speaker on the 15th ballot. After relying on bipartisan votes to get out of a debt ceiling crisis and government shutdown threats, McCarthy became the first speaker ever to be removed from the role during a legislative session on October 3, 2023. Following three failed attempts by various representatives to fill the post, on October 25, Mike Johnson was elected as speaker. Johnson would advance four more bipartisan continuing resolutions from November into March to avoid shutdowns. Congress finalized the 2024 United States federal budget on March 23, 2024, through two separate minibus packages. Following a contentious foreign-aid vote, a motion to remove Johnson from the speakership was defeated in a bipartisan vote.

Partisan disciplinary actions also increased. With the expulsion of New York representative George Santos from the House in December 2023, over the opposition of the speaker, this was the first congress since the 107th in which a member was expelled, and the first ever in which a Republican was. There was also an increase of censures passed in the House, being the first congress with multiple censures since the 1983 congressional page sex scandal and the most in one year since 1870. In December 2023, House Republicans authorized an impeachment inquiry into Joe Biden, followed by the impeachment of Alejandro Mayorkas in February 2024, the first time a cabinet secretary has been the target of impeachment proceedings since William W. Belknap in 1876, and only the second such cabinet impeachment in history. The charges were dismissed by the Senate, the first time the Senate dismissed impeachment articles without trial after the reading.

This is the most recent Congress with Democratic senators from the states of Montana (Jon Tester) and Ohio (Sherrod Brown), both of whom lost re-election in 2024.

The 118th Congress passed the fewest bills since the 1980s.

== Major events ==
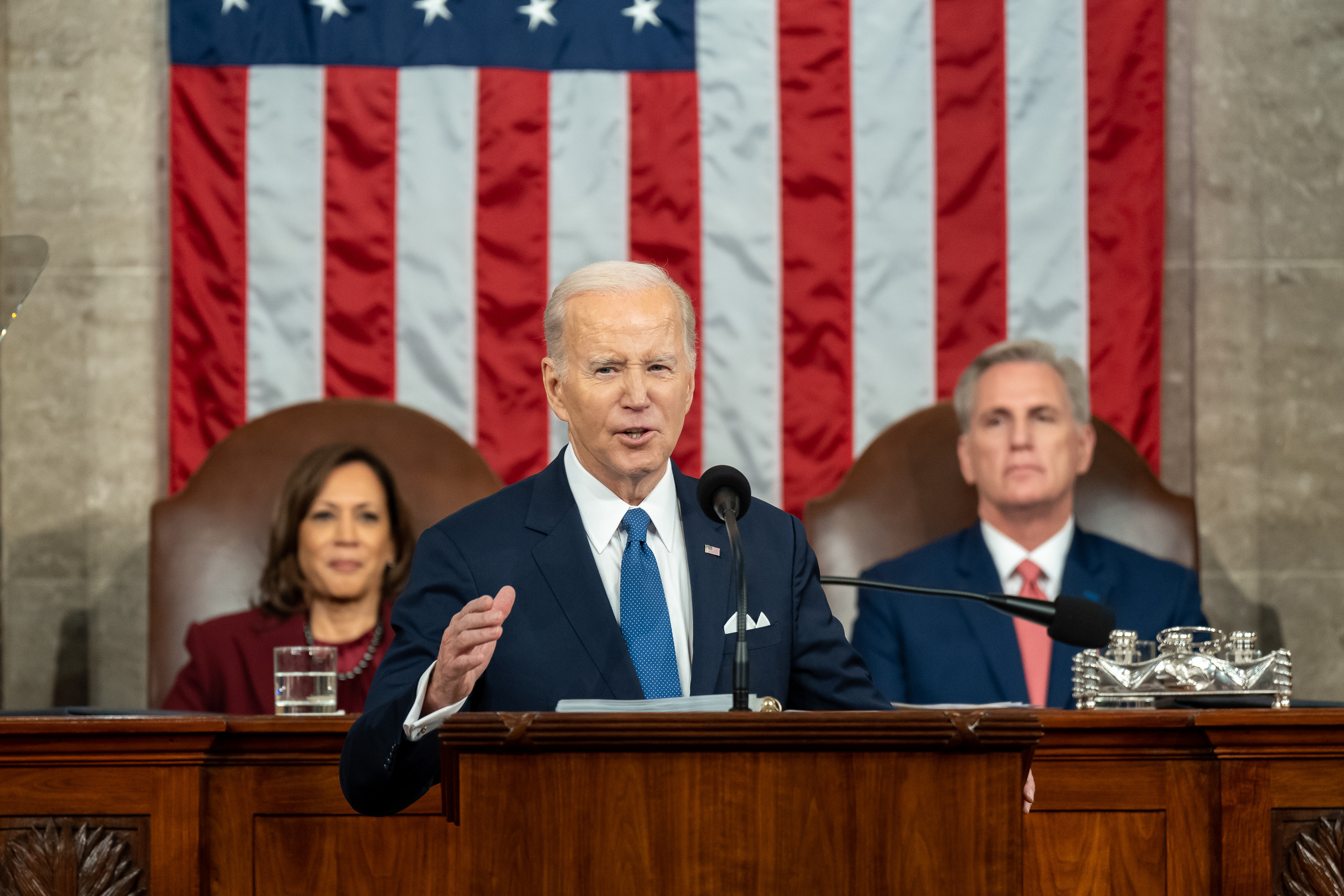
President Biden during his 2023 State of the Union Address, with Vice President Kamala Harris and House Speaker Kevin McCarthy.

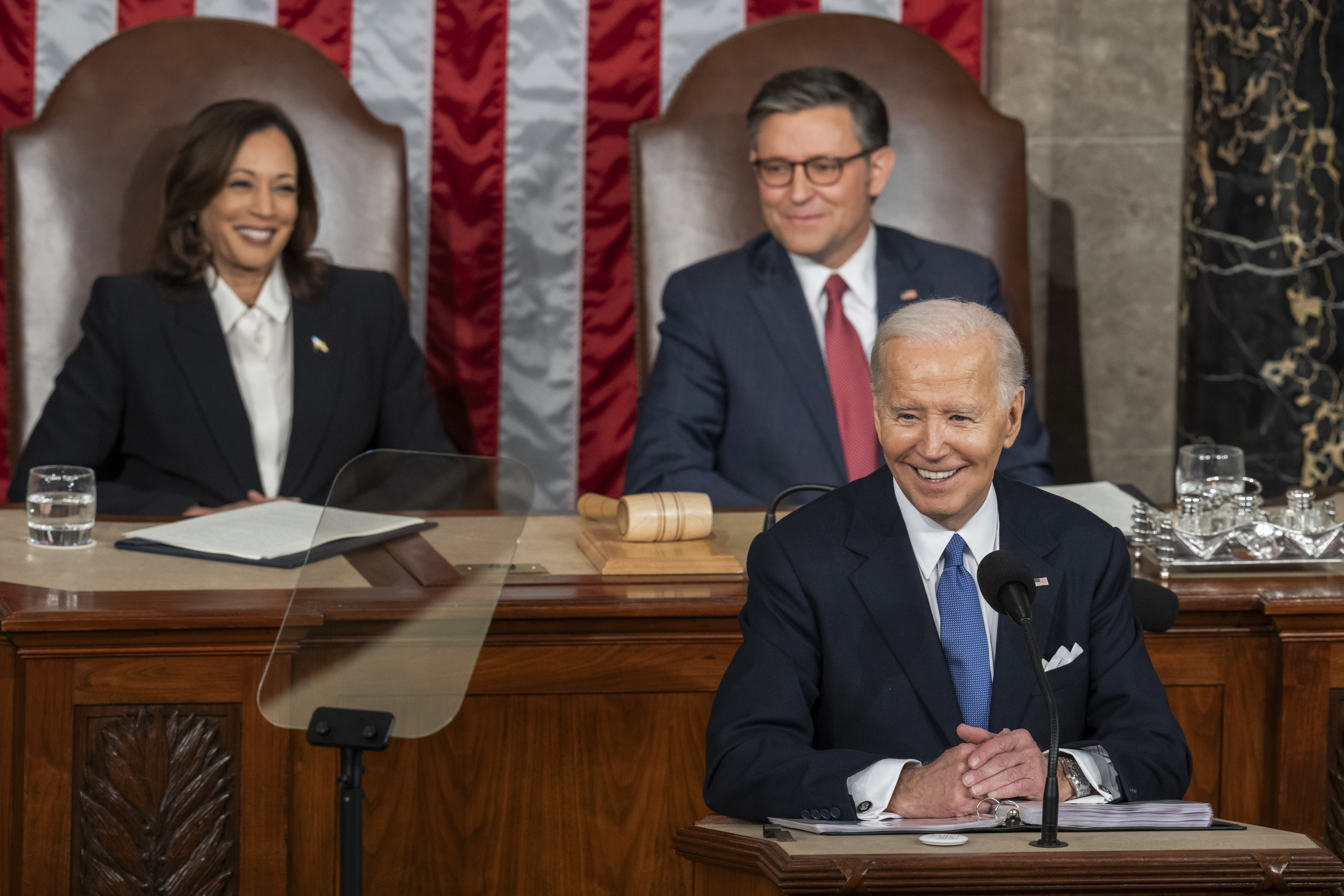
President Biden during his 2024 State of the Union Address, with Vice President Harris and House Speaker Mike Johnson.

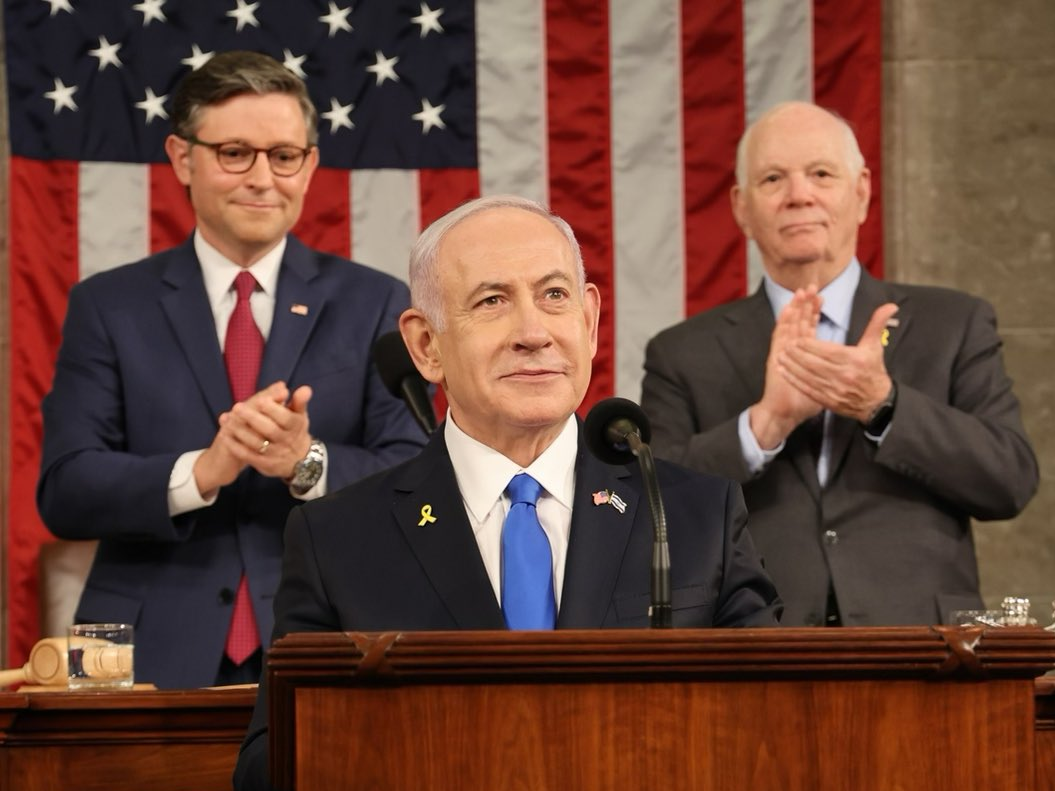
Israeli Prime Minister Benjamin Netanyahu addresses a joint session of Congress with House Speaker Johnson and Senator Ben Cardin

- January 3, 2023, 12 p.m. EST: Congress convenes. Members-elect of the United States Senate are sworn in, but members-elect of the United States House of Representatives cannot be sworn as the House adjourns for the day without electing a speaker.
- January 3–7, 2023: The election for the House speakership takes 15 ballots. Kevin McCarthy (R) is ultimately elected as speaker, but only after 6 representatives-elect vote "present", lowering the threshold to be elected from 218 to 215.
- February 2, 2023: House votes 218–211 to remove Representative Ilhan Omar of Minnesota from the Committee on Foreign Affairs for her comments about Israel and concerns over her objectivity.
- February 7, 2023: President Joe Biden delivers the 2023 State of the Union Address.
- April 27, 2023: South Korean president Yoon Suk Yeol addresses a joint session of Congress.
- June 3, 2023: The 2023 debt-ceiling crisis ends with the Fiscal Responsibility Act of 2023.
- June 21, 2023: House votes 213–209 to censure Representative Adam Schiff of California for his actions during the congressional investigation of Russian interference in the 2016 presidential election and the first impeachment of Donald Trump.
- June 22, 2023: Indian prime minister Narendra Modi addresses a joint session of Congress.
- July 12, 2023: Kamala Harris casts her 31st tie-breaking vote as Vice President, tying the record set by John C. Calhoun, to invoke cloture on Kalpana Kotagal's nomination to the Equal Employment Opportunity Commission.
- August 10, 2023: The House Subcommittee on Government Operations and the Federal Workforce, holds a televised investigative hearing on the federal government's response to and overall recovery efforts from Hurricane Ian in 2022.
- September 12, 2023: House opens an impeachment inquiry into Joe Biden.
- September 29, 2023: Senator Dianne Feinstein of California dies.
- October 3, 2023: House votes 216–210 to remove Kevin McCarthy from the position of Speaker of the House through a motion to vacate the chair by Matt Gaetz of Florida. Patrick McHenry becomes Speaker pro tempore.
- October 17–25, 2023: October 2023 Speaker election
- October 19, 2023: President Biden gives a primetime oval office address, calling for a new aid package for Israel and Ukraine, amid the ongoing Russian invasion of Ukraine and the Gaza war.
- October 25, 2023: Mike Johnson is elected Speaker of the House of Representatives.
- November 7, 2023: House votes 234–188 to censure Representative Rashida Tlaib of Michigan for her comments condemning Israel in the midst of the Gaza war.
- December 1, 2023: Over the opposition of the Speaker, the House votes 311–114–2 to expel Representative George Santos of New York following a United States House Committee on Ethics report that unanimously found substantial evidence Santos violated federal criminal law.
- December 5, 2023: Kamala Harris casts her 32nd and 33rd tie-breaking votes, surpassing the record set by John C. Calhoun, to invoke cloture and then confirm the nomination of Loren AliKhan to serve as a judge on the United States District Court for the District of Columbia.
- December 5, 2023: The House Committee on Education and the Workforce holds a widely viewed televised hearing on antisemitism on college campuses.
- December 7, 2023: House votes 214–191 to censure Representative Jamaal Bowman of New York for pulling a fire alarm in the Capitol in September.
- February 6, 2024: Members of the House vote on whether to impeach Secretary of Homeland Security Alejandro Mayorkas, but the vote to do so fails by 214–216.
- February 13, 2024: House votes again to impeach Secretary of Homeland Security Alejandro Mayorkas, succeeding 214–213.
- February 28, 2024: Senator Mitch McConnell announces he will step down as Republican Senate Leader at the end of the 118th Congress, in January 2025.
- March 7, 2024: President Biden delivers the 2024 State of the Union Address.
- April 11, 2024: Japanese Prime Minister Fumio Kishida addresses a joint session of Congress.
- April 16–17, 2024: Two articles of impeachment against Secretary of Homeland Security Alejandro Mayorkas are delivered and read in the Senate, with votes on the following day to dismiss both articles without a full trial, 51–48 and 51–49.
- April 24, 2024: Representative Donald Payne Jr. of New Jersey dies.
- May 8, 2024: House votes 359–43 to table a resolution removing Mike Johnson from the position of Speaker of the House with 11 Republicans opposed.
- May 31, 2024: Senator Joe Manchin of West Virginia leaves the Democratic Party and registers as an independent.
- June 12, 2024: House votes 216–207 to hold Attorney General Merrick Garland in criminal contempt of Congress for his refusal to comply with the House Oversight Committee's request to turn over audiotapes of Biden regarding his classified document incident.
- July 16, 2024: Senator Bob Menendez of New Jersey is found guilty of conspiracy by a public official to act as a foreign agent. He later announced he would resign on August 20.
- July 19, 2024: Representative Sheila Jackson Lee of Texas dies.
- July 24, 2024: Israeli prime minister Benjamin Netanyahu addresses a joint session of Congress.
- August 20, 2024: Senator Bob Menendez of New Jersey resigns.
- August 21, 2024: Representative Bill Pascrell of New Jersey dies.
- November 5, 2024: 2024 United States elections were held. Former President Donald Trump was elected the 47th president of the United States and JD Vance was elected the 50th vice president of the United States, while Republicans regained control of the Senate and retained control of the House of Representatives.
- November 13, 2024: Senate Republicans elect John Thune as the new Senate Republican leader that will begin with the next Congress.
- November 13, 2024: Representative Matt Gaetz of Florida resigns after being nominated by President-elect Trump for United States attorney general.
- December 8, 2024: Governor-appointed Senator George Helmy of New Jersey resigns.
- December 8, 2024: Governor-appointed Senator Laphonza Butler of California resigns.
- December 9, 2024: Representative Adam Schiff of California resigns after winning the 2024 United States Senate election in California.
- December 29, 2024: Former President Jimmy Carter dies at 100 years old.

== Major legislation ==
=== Enacted ===
- March 20, 2023: COVID-19 Origin Act of 2023, S. 619
- June 3, 2023: Fiscal Responsibility Act of 2023, H.R. 3746
- September 30, 2023: Continuing Appropriations Act, 2024 and Other Extensions Act, H.R. 5860
- November 17, 2023: Further Continuing Appropriations and Other Extensions Act, 2024, H.R. 6363
- December 22, 2023: National Defense Authorization Act for Fiscal Year 2024, H.R. 2670
- January 19, 2024: Further Additional Continuing Appropriations and Other Extensions Act, 2024, H.R. 2872
- February 9, 2024: Moving Americans Privacy Protection Act, H.R. 1568
- March 1, 2024: Extension of Continuing Appropriations and Other Matters Act, 2024, H.R. 7463
- March 9, 2024: Consolidated Appropriations Act, 2024, H.R. 4366
- March 18, 2024: END FENTANYL Act, 2024, S. 206
- March 23, 2024: Further Consolidated Appropriations Act, 2024, H.R. 2882
- April 20, 2024: Reforming Intelligence and Securing America Act, H.R. 7888
- April 24, 2024: National Security Act, 2024 (including supplemental aid to Ukraine and Israel, and the divestment-or-ban of TikTok), H.R. 815
- April 24, 2024: Migratory Birds of the Americas Conservation Enhancements Act of 2023, H.R. 4389
- May 13, 2024: Prohibiting Russian Uranium Imports Act, 2024, H.R. 1042
- May 16, 2024: FAA Reauthorization Act of 2024, H.R. 3935
- July 9, 2024: ADVANCE Act of 2024, S. 870
- July 12, 2024: Maternal and Child Health Stillbirth Prevention Act of 2024, H.R. 4581
- July 30, 2024: All-American Flag Act, S. 1973
- October 1, 2024: Alzheimer's Accountability and Investment Act, S. 134
- November 25, 2024: Veterans’ Compensation Cost-of-Living Adjustment Act of 2024, H.R. 7777
- December 21, 2024: American Relief Act, 2025, H.R. 10545
- December 23, 2024: No CORRUPTION Act, S. 932
- December 23, 2024: To amend title 36, United States Code, to designate the bald eagle as the national bird, S. 4610
- December 23, 2024: Veterans Benefits Improvement Act of 2024, S. 2181
- December 23, 2024: National Defense Authorization Act for Fiscal Year 2025, H.R. 5009
- December 23, 2024: Autism CARES Act of 2024, H.R. 7213
- December 23, 2024: Stop Institutional Child Abuse Act, S. 1351
- December 23, 2024: NACIE Improvement Act, S. 5355
- January 2, 2025: Senator Elizabeth Dole 21st Century Veterans Healthcare and Benefits Improvement Act, S. 141
- January 4, 2025: Gabriella Miller Kids First Research Act 2.0, H.R. 3391
- January 4, 2025: Keeping Military Families Together Act of 2024, S. 2181
- January 5, 2025: Social Security Fairness Act of 2023, H.R. 82

=== Proposed (but not enacted) ===
House bills

- H.R. 1: Lower Energy Costs Act (passed House on March 30, 2023, but not yet sent to the Senate)
- H.R. 2: Secure the Border Act of 2023 (passed House, pending before the Senate as of May 11, 2023)
- H.R. 5: Parents Bill of Rights Act (passed House, pending before the Senate as of March 27, 2023)
- H.R. 7: No Taxpayer Funding for Abortion and Abortion Insurance Full Disclosure Act of 2023 (House committee consideration as of January 9, 2023)
- H.R. 11: Freedom to Vote Act
- H.R. 12: Women's Health Protection Act of 2023
- H.R. 14: John R. Lewis Voting Rights Advancement Act of 2023
- H.R. 15: Equality Act
- H.R. 16: American Dream and Promise Act of 2023
- H.R. 17: Paycheck Fairness Act
- H.R. 20: Richard L. Trumka Protecting the Right to Organize Act of 2023
- H.R. 21: Strategic Production Response Act (passed House, pending before the Senate as of January 30, 2023)
- H.R. 22: Protecting America's Strategic Petroleum Reserve from China Act (passed House, pending before the Senate as of January 25, 2023)
- H.R. 23: Family and Small Business Taxpayer Protection Act (passed House, pending before the Senate as of January 25, 2023)
- H.R. 25: FairTax Act of 2023 (House committee consideration as of January 9, 2023)
- H.R. 26: Born-Alive Abortion Survivors Protection Act (passed House, pending before the Senate as of January 25, 2023)
- H.R. 40: Commission to Study and Develop Reparation Proposals for African-Americans Act
- H.R. 51: Washington, D.C., Admission Act (House committee consideration as of January 9, 2023)
- H.R. 277: Regulations from the Executive in Need of Scrutiny Act (passed House, pending before the Senate as of June 20, 2023)
- H.R. 734: Protection of Women and Girls in Sports Act of 2023 (passed House, pending before the Senate as of April 25, 2023)
- H.R. 1124: Federal Death Penalty Abolition Act
- H.R. 1279: Sunshine Protection Act of 2023
- H.R. 1282: "The Major Richard Star Act" To amend title 10, United States Code, to expand eligibility to certain military retirees for concurrent receipt of veterans' disability compensation and retired pay or combat-related special compensation, and for other purposes (placed on Union Calendar No. 117)
- H.R. 2663: Workplace Violence Prevention for Health Care and Social Service Workers Act
- H.R. 2757: Puerto Rico Status Act
- H.R. 2811: Limit, Save, Grow Act of 2023 (partially incorporated into Fiscal Responsibility Act of 2023)
- H.R. 2891: SAFE Banking Act of 2023
- H.R. 2953: FAIR Act of 2023
- H.R. 3194: U.S. Citizenship Act of 2023
- H.R. 3421: Medicare for All Act
- H.R. 3481: FAMILY Act
- H.R. 4319: Farm Workforce Modernization Act of 2023
- H.R. 4889: Raise the Wage Act of 2023
- H.R. 5601: MORE Act of 2023
- H.R. 7024: Tax Relief for American Families and Workers Act of 2024 (passed House, Senate rejected cloture motion on August 1, 2024)
- H.R. 7521: Protecting Americans from Foreign Adversary Controlled Applications Act (incorporated into National Security Act, 2024)

Senate bills

- S. 1: Freedom to Vote Act
- S. 5: Equality Act
- S. 40: Commission to Study and Develop Reparation Proposals for African-Americans Act
- S. 147: See Something, Say Something Online Act
- S. 316: A bill to repeal the authorizations for use of military force against Iraq. (passed Senate, pending before the House as of March 30, 2023)
- S. 326: VA Medicinal Cannabis Research Act (Senate rejected cloture motion on April 26, 2023)
- S. 582: Sunshine Protection Act of 2023
- S. 567: Richard L. Trumka Protecting the Right to Organize Act of 2023
- S. 597: Social Security Fairness Act of 2023
- S. 686: RESTRICT Act (Senate committee consideration as of March 7, 2023)
- S. 701: Women's Health Protection Act of 2023 (placed on Legislative Calendar on March 9, 2023)
- S. 870: Fire Grants and Safety Act (pending before the House as of April 24, 2023)
- S. 916: Junk Fee Prevention Act (Senate committee consideration as of March 22, 2023)
- S. 1149: Recovering America's Wildlife Act of 2023
- S. 1176: Workplace Violence Prevention for Health Care and Social Service Workers Act
- S. 1284: TORNADO Act
- S. 1376: Forced Arbitration Injustice Repeal Act
- S. 1409: Kids Online Safety Act
- S. 1655: Medicare for All Act
- S. 1714: FAMILY Act
- S. 2033: American Innovation and Choice Online Act
- S. 2488: Raise the Wage Act of 2023
- S. 2860: SAFER Banking Act of 2023
- S. 2944: Puerto Rico Status Act
- H.R. 4818: Treat and Reduce Obesity Act of 2023
- Passed, but vetoed
  - S. 4199: JUDGES Act of 2024

== Major resolutions ==
=== Adopted ===
- H.Res. 5: Adopting the Rules of the House of Representatives for the One Hundred Eighteenth Congress, and for other purposes.
- H.Res. 11: Establishing the Select Committee on the Strategic Competition Between the United States and the Chinese Communist Party.
- H.Res. 12: Establishing a Select Subcommittee on the Weaponization of the Federal Government as a select investigative subcommittee of the Committee on the Judiciary.
- H.Res. 76: Removing Ilhan Omar from the House Foreign Affairs Committee.
- H.Res. 521: Censuring Adam Schiff and referring his conduct to the House Ethics Committee for further investigation.
- H.Res. 757: Declaring the office of Speaker of the House of Representatives to be vacant.
- H.Res. 845: Censuring Rashida Tlaib for statements on the Gaza war considered antisemitic.
- H.Res. 863: Impeaching Secretary of Homeland Security Alejandro Mayorkas.
- H.Res. 878: Expelling George Santos for alleged fraud and campaign finance violations.
- H.Res. 914: Censuring Jamaal Bowman for pulling a fire alarm in the Capitol when there was no fire.
- H.Res. 1292: Holding Attorney General Merrick Garland in contempt of Congress for failing to comply with a subpoena in relation to the Joe Biden classified documents incident.
- H.J.Res. 7: Terminating the national emergency concerning COVID-19 declared by the President on March 13, 2020.
- H.J.Res. 26: Disapproving the action of the District of Columbia Council in approving the Revised Criminal Code Act of 2022.
- S.Res. 376: Clarifying the dress code for the floor of the Senate.

=== Proposed ===
- H.Res. 319: Recognizing the duty of the Federal Government to create a Green New Deal
- H.Res. 786: Calling for an immediate deescalation and cease-fire in Israel and occupied Palestine. (referred to the House Foreign Affairs Committee)
- H.Con.Res. 3: Expressing the sense of Congress condemning the recent attacks on pro-life facilities, groups, and churches. (awaiting action in the Senate)
- H.Con.Res. 9: Denouncing the horrors of socialism. (awaiting action in the Senate)
- S.J.Res. 4: Removing the deadline for the ratification of the Equal Rights Amendment.
- S.J.Res. 111: Providing for congressional disapproval of the proposed foreign military sale to Israel of certain defense articles and services.

=== Vetoed ===
- H.J.Res. 27: Providing for congressional disapproval under chapter 8 of title 5, United States Code, of the rule submitted by the Department of the Army, Corps of Engineers, Department of Defense and the Environmental Protection Agency relating to "Revised Definition of 'Waters of the United States'".
- H.J.Res. 30: Providing for congressional disapproval under chapter 8 of title 5, United States Code, of the rule submitted by the Department of Labor relating to "Prudence and Loyalty in Selecting Plan Investments and Exercising Shareholder Rights".
- H.J.Res. 39: Disapproving the rule submitted by the Department of Commerce relating to "Procedures Covering Suspension of Liquidation, Duties and Estimated Duties in Accord With Presidential Proclamation 10414".
- H.J.Res. 42: Disapproving the action of the District of Columbia Council in approving the Comprehensive Policing and Justice Reform Amendment Act of 2022.
- H.J.Res. 45: Providing for congressional disapproval under chapter 8 of title 5, United States Code, of the rule submitted by the Department of Education relating to "Waivers and Modifications of Federal Student Loans".
- H.J.Res. 98: Providing for congressional disapproval under chapter 8 of title 5, United States Code, of the rule submitted by the National Labor Relations Board relating to "Standard for Determining Joint Employer Status".
- H.J.Res. 109: Providing for congressional disapproval under chapter 8 of title 5, United States Code, of the rule submitted by the Securities and Exchange Commission relating to "Staff Accounting Bulletin No. 121".
- S.J.Res. 11: Providing for congressional disapproval under chapter 8 of title 5, United States Code, of the rule submitted by the Environmental Protection Agency relating to "Control of Air Pollution From New Motor Vehicles: Heavy-Duty Engine and Vehicle Standards".
- S.J.Res. 32: Providing for congressional disapproval under chapter 8 of title 5, United States Code, of the rule submitted by the Bureau of Consumer Financial Protection relating to "Small Business Lending Under the Equal Credit Opportunity Act (Regulation B)".
- S.J.Res. 38: Providing for congressional disapproval under chapter 8 of title 5, United States Code, of the rule submitted by the Federal Highway Administration relating to "Waiver of Buy America Requirements for Electric Vehicle Chargers".

== Party summary ==
Resignations and new members are discussed in the "Changes in membership" section:

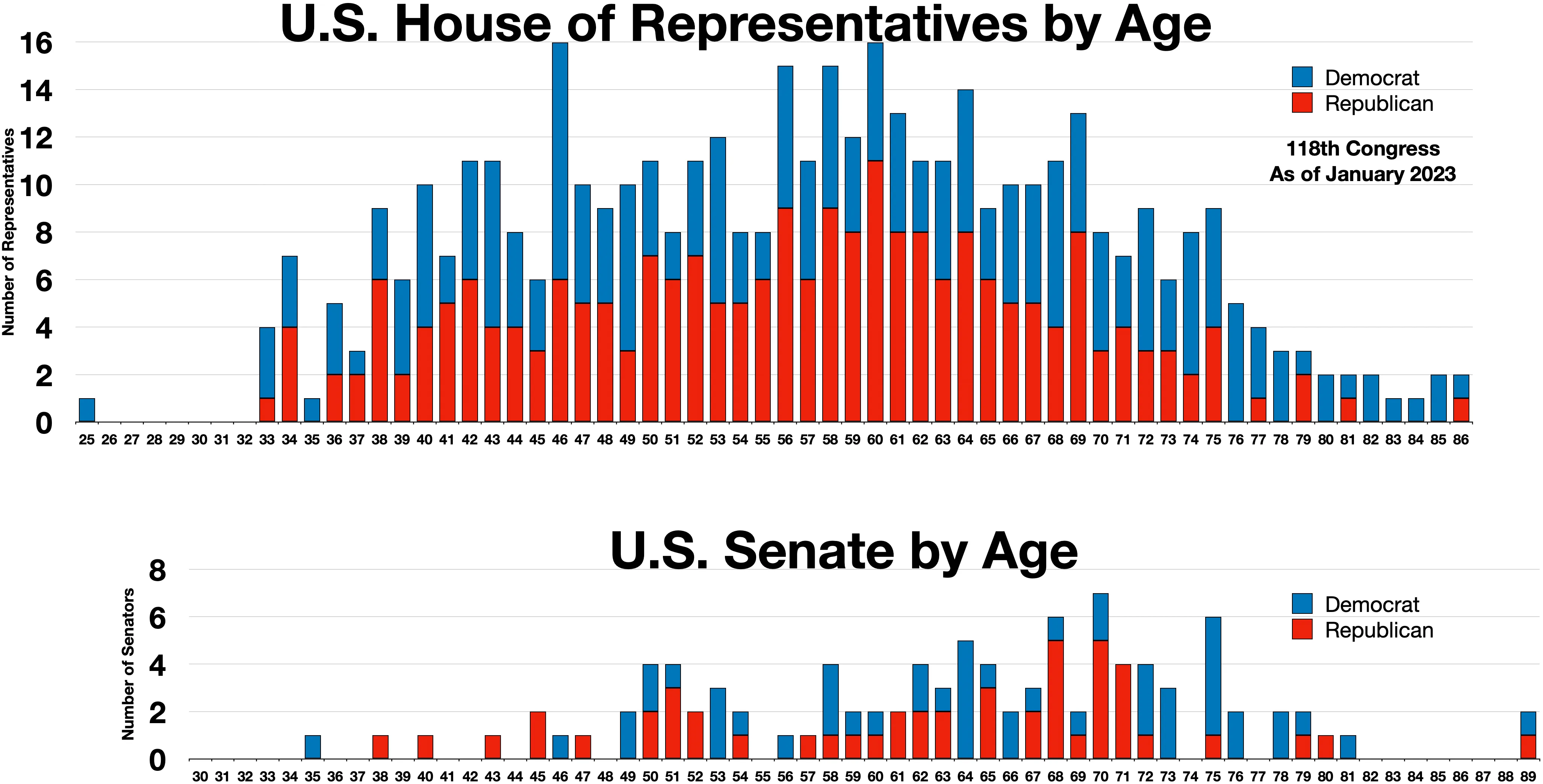
Number of members of Congress by age, 118th Congress

=== Senate ===
Senate membership

Final (September 9, 2024 – January 3, 2025)

Begin (January 3, 2023 – January 8, 2023)

January 8, 2023 – January 23, 2023

January 23, 2023 – September 29, 2023

September 29, 2023 – October 3, 2023

October 3, 2023 – May 31, 2024

May 31, 2024 – August 20, 2024

August 20, 2024 – September 9, 2024

Overview of Senate membership by party
	Party (shading shows control)			Total	Vacant
	Democratic	Independent (Note: All four self-identified independents caucus with the Democrats.)	Republican	Total	Vacant
End of previous Congress (Note: In Arizona: Kyrsten Sinema left the Democratic Party to become an independent politician on December 9, 2022. Effective January 3, 2023, Sinema did not participate in either political party caucus but kept her seniority and continued to receive committee assignments through the Democrats.)	48	2	50	100	0
Begin (January 3, 2023)	48	3	49	100	0
January 8, 2023 (Note: In Nebraska: Ben Sasse (R) resigned on January 8, 2023, to become President of the University of Florida. Pete Ricketts (R) was appointed to fill the vacancy on January 12, 2023, and took office on January 23.)	48	3	48	99	1
January 23, 2023	48	3	49	100	0
September 29, 2023 (Note: In California: Dianne Feinstein (D) died on September 29, 2023. Laphonza Butler (D) was appointed to fill the vacancy on October 1, 2023, and took office on October 3.)	47	3	49	99	1
October 3, 2023	48	3	49	100	0
May 31, 2024 (Note: In West Virginia: Joe Manchin left the Democratic Party to become an independent politician on May 31, 2024. He continued to caucus with the Democrats.)	47	4	49	100	0
August 20, 2024 (Note: Bob Menendez resigned on August 20, 2024, due to criminal conviction. George Helmy was appointed to fill the vacancy on August 23, 2023, and took office on September 9.)	46	4	49	99	1
September 9, 2024	47	4	49	100	0
Last voting share	51%		49%		
Beginning of the next Congress	45	2	52	99	1

=== House of Representatives ===
House membership

Final (December 31, 2024 – January 3, 2025)

Begin (January 3, 2023 – March 7, 2023)

March 7, 2023 – May 31, 2023

May 31, 2023 – September 15, 2023

September 15, 2023 – November 13, 2023

November 13, 2023 – November 28, 2023

November 28, 2023 – December 1, 2023

December 1, 2023 – December 31, 2023

December 31, 2023 – January 21, 2024

January 21, 2024 – February 2, 2024

February 2, 2024 – February 28, 2024

February 28, 2024 – March 22, 2024

March 22, 2024 – April 20, 2024

April 20, 2024 – April 24, 2024

April 24, 2024 – May 6, 2024

May 6, 2024 – June 3, 2024

June 3, 2024 – June 25, 2024

June 25, 2024 – July 8, 2024

July 8, 2024 – July 19, 2024

July 19, 2024 – August 21, 2024

August 21, 2024 – September 23, 2024

September 23, 2024 – November 12, 2024

November 12, 2024 – November 13, 2024

November 13, 2024 – December 8, 2024

December 8, 2024 – December 14, 2024

December 14, 2024 – December 31, 2024

Overview of House membership by party
	Party (shading shows control)		Total	Vacant
	Democratic	Republican	Total	Vacant
End of previous Congress	216	213	429	6
Begin (January 3, 2023) (Note: In Virginia's 4th district: Donald McEachin (D) died during the previous Congress, and Jennifer McClellan (D) was elected February 21, 2023. She was sworn in on March 7.)	212	222	434	1
March 7, 2023	213	222	435	0
May 31, 2023 (Note: In Rhode Island's 1st district: David Cicilline (D) resigned on May 31, 2023, and Gabe Amo (D) was elected November 7, 2023. He was sworn in on November 13, 2023.)	212	222	434	1
September 15, 2023 (Note: In Utah's 2nd district: Chris Stewart (R) resigned on September 15, 2023, due to his wife's health issues, and Celeste Maloy (R) was elected November 21, 2023. She was sworn in on November 28, 2023.)	212	221	433	2
November 13, 2023	213	221	434	1
November 28, 2023	213	222	435	0
December 1, 2023 (Note: In New York's 3rd district: George Santos (R) was expelled on December 1, 2023. Tom Suozzi (D) was elected February 13, 2024. He was sworn in on February 28, 2024.)	213	221	434	1
December 31, 2023 (Note: In California's 20th district: Kevin McCarthy (R) resigned on December 31, 2023. Vince Fong (R) was elected May 21, 2024. He was sworn in on June 3, 2024.)	213	220	433	2
January 21, 2024 (Note: In Ohio's 6th district: Bill Johnson (R) resigned on January 21, 2024. Michael Rulli (R) was elected June 11, 2024. He was sworn in on June 25, 2024.)	213	219	432	3
February 2, 2024 (Note: In New York's 26th district: Brian Higgins (D) resigned on February 2, 2024. Tim Kennedy (D) was elected April 30, 2024. He was sworn in on May 6, 2024.)	212	219	431	4
February 28, 2024	213	219	432	3
March 22, 2024 (Note: In Colorado's 4th district: Ken Buck (R) resigned on March 22, 2024. Greg Lopez (R) was elected June 25, 2024. He was sworn in on July 8, 2024.)	213	218	431	4
April 20, 2024 (Note: In Wisconsin's 8th district: Mike Gallagher (R) resigned on April 20, 2024. Tony Wied (R) was elected November 5, 2024. He was sworn in on November 12, 2024.)	213	217	430	5
April 24, 2024 (Note: In New Jersey's 10th district: Donald Payne Jr. (D) died on April 24, 2024. LaMonica McIver (D) was elected September 18, 2024. She was sworn in on September 23, 2024.)	212	217	429	6
May 6, 2024	213	217	430	5
June 3, 2024	213	218	431	4
June 25, 2024	213	219	432	3
July 8, 2024	213	220	433	2
July 19, 2024 (Note: In Texas's 18th district: Sheila Jackson Lee (D) died on July 19, 2024. Erica Lee Carter (D) was elected November 5, 2024. She was sworn in on November 12, 2024.)	212	220	432	3
August 21, 2024 (Note: In New Jersey's 9th district: Bill Pascrell (D) died on August 21, 2024.)	211	220	431	4
September 23, 2024	212	220	432	3
November 12, 2024	213	221	434	1
November 13, 2024 (Note: In Florida's 1st district: Matt Gaetz (R) resigned November 13, 2024.)	213	220	433	2
December 8, 2024 (Note: In California's 30th district: Adam Schiff (D) resigned December 8, 2024 after being elected Senator.) (Note: In New Jersey's 3rd district: Andy Kim (D) resigned December 8, 2024 after being elected Senator.)	211	220	431	4
December 14, 2024 (Note: In North Dakota's at-large district: Kelly Armstrong (R) resigned December 14, 2024. In anticipation of becoming Governor of North Dakota.)	211	219	430	5
December 31, 2024 (Note: In North Carolina's 14th district: Jeff Jackson (D) resigned December 31, 2024. In anticipation of becoming Attorney General of North Carolina.)	210	219	429	6
Last voting share	48.95%	51.05%		
Non-voting members	3	2 (Note: Includes a New Progressive Party member who is also affiliated as a Republican.)	5	1
Beginning of the next Congress	215	219	434	1

== Leadership ==
Note: Democrats refer to themselves as a "caucus"; Republicans refer to themselves as a "conference".

=== Senate ===
Senate President Kamala Harris (D)

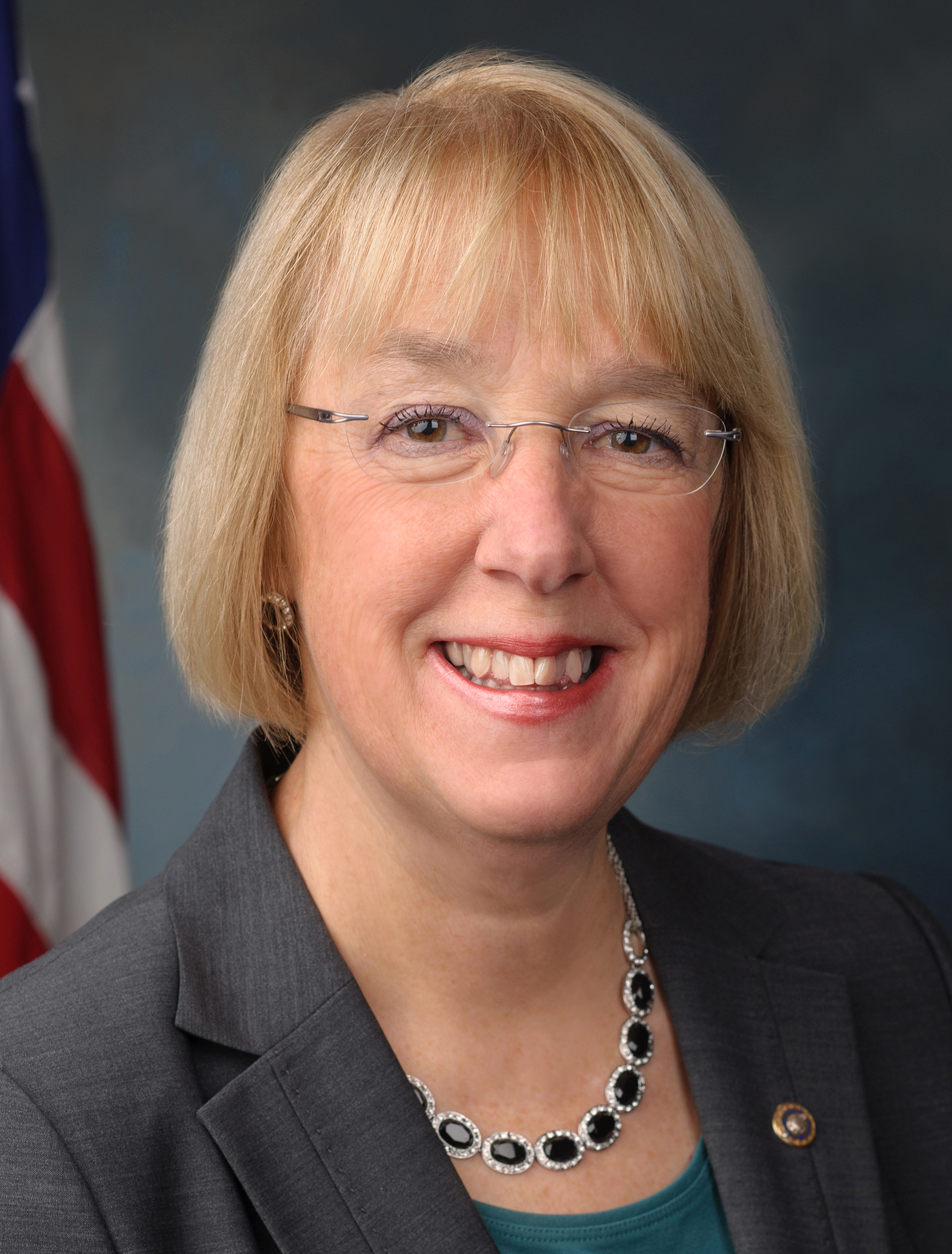
Senate President pro tempore Patty Murray (D)

==== Presiding ====
- President: Kamala Harris (D)
- President pro tempore: Patty Murray (D)

==== Majority (Democratic) ====
- Majority Leader/Chair of the Senate Democratic Caucus: (Note: Since 1920, the Senate Democratic leader has also concurrently served as the Democratic Caucus chairperson; this is an unwritten tradition.) Chuck Schumer (NY)
- Majority Whip: Dick Durbin (IL)
- Chair of the Democratic Policy and Communications Committee: Debbie Stabenow (MI)
- Chair of the Democratic Steering Committee: Amy Klobuchar (MN)
- Vice Chairs, Senate Democratic Caucus: Mark Warner (VA) and Elizabeth Warren (MA)
- Chair of the Democratic Outreach Committee: Bernie Sanders (VT)
- Secretary of the Senate Democratic Caucus: Tammy Baldwin (WI)
- Vice Chairs of the Democratic Policy and Communications Committee: Joe Manchin (WV) and Cory Booker (NJ)
- Chair of the Democratic Senatorial Campaign Committee: Gary Peters (MI)
- Vice Chair of the Democratic Steering Committee: Jeanne Shaheen (NH)
- Vice Chair of the Democratic Outreach Committee: Catherine Cortez Masto (NV)
- Deputy Secretary of the Senate Democratic Caucus: Brian Schatz (HI)
- Senate Democratic Chief Deputy Whip: Jeff Merkley (OR)
- Vice Chairs of the Democratic Senatorial Campaign Committee: Tina Smith (MN) and Alex Padilla (CA)

==== Minority (Republican) ====
- Minority Leader: Mitch McConnell (KY)
- Minority Whip: John Thune (SD)
- Chairman of the Senate Republican Conference: John Barrasso (WY)
- Chairwoman of the Republican Policy Committee: Joni Ernst (IA)
- Vice Chair of the Senate Republican Conference: Shelley Moore Capito (WV)
- Chairman of the National Republican Senatorial Campaign Committee: Steve Daines (MT)
- Chair of the Senate Republican Steering Committee: Mike Lee (UT)

=== House of Representatives ===
House Speaker

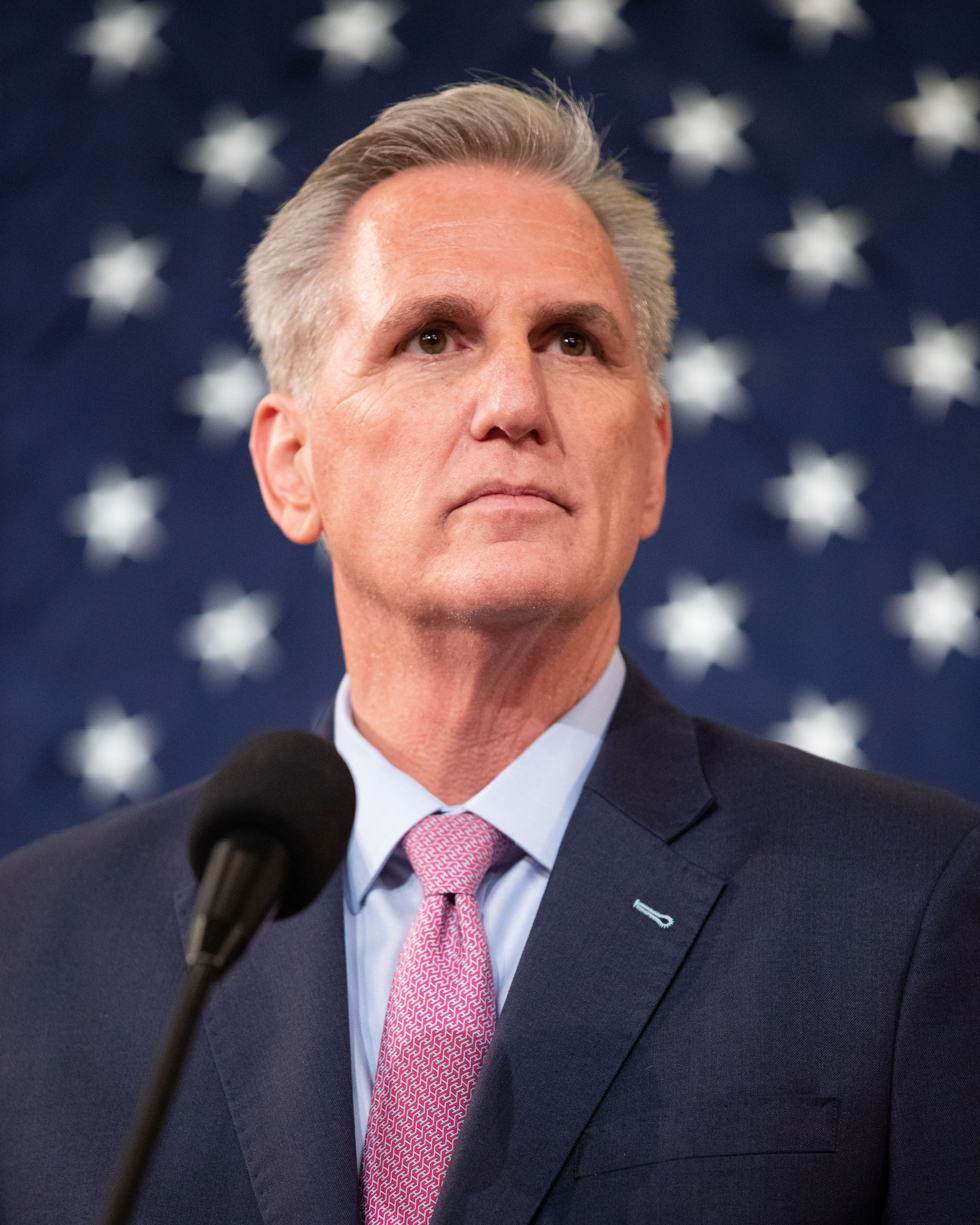
Kevin McCarthy (R),
from January 7 to October 3, 2023

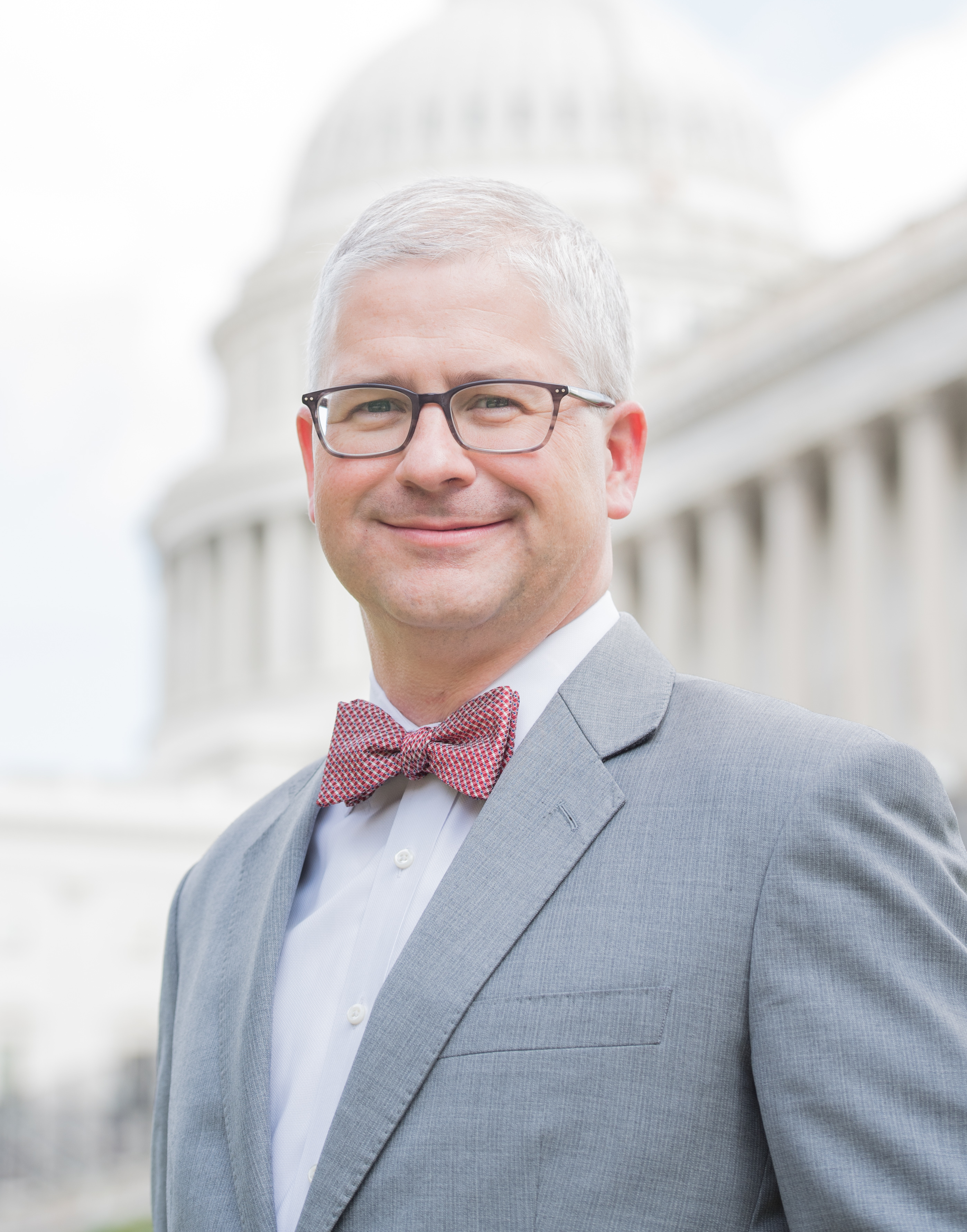
Patrick McHenry (R),
from October 3 to October 25, 2023 (as Speaker pro tempore)

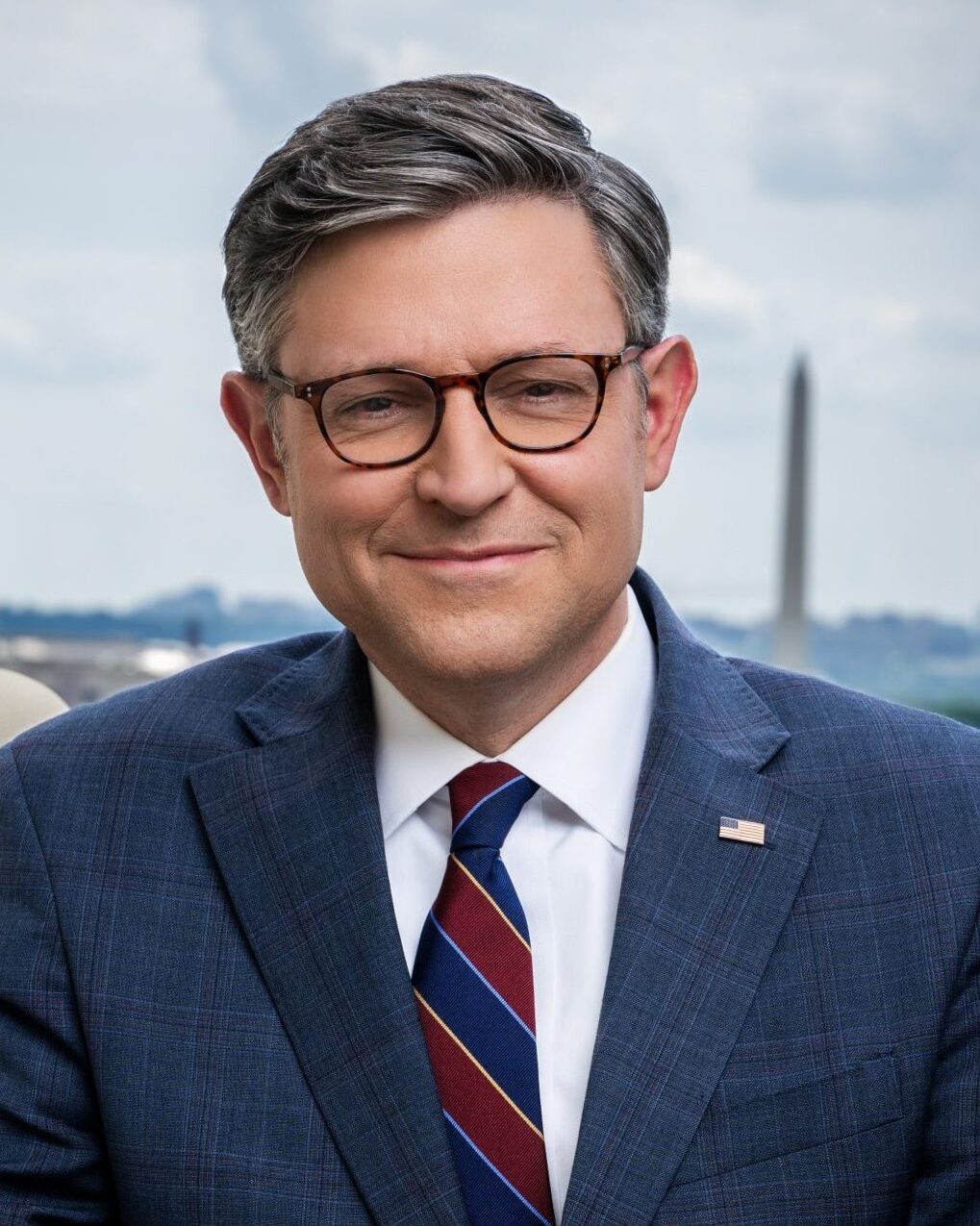
Mike Johnson (R),
from October 25, 2023

==== Presiding ====
- Speaker:
  - Kevin McCarthy (R), January 7, 2023 – October 3, 2023
  - Patrick McHenry (R), October 3–25, 2023 (as Speaker pro tempore)
  - Mike Johnson (R), from October 25, 2023

==== Majority (Republican) ====
- Majority Leader: Steve Scalise (LA 1)
- Majority Whip: Tom Emmer (MN 6)
- Conference Chair: Elise Stefanik (NY 21)
- Vice Chair of the House Republican Conference:
  - Mike Johnson (LA 4), until October 25, 2023
  - Blake Moore (UT 1), since November 8, 2023
- Policy Committee Chairman: Gary Palmer (AL 6)
- Conference Secretary: Lisa McClain (MI 9)
- Campaign Committee Chairman: Richard Hudson (NC 9)
- Majority Chief Deputy Whip: Guy Reschenthaler (PA 14)

==== Minority (Democratic) ====
- Minority Leader: Hakeem Jeffries (NY 8)
- Minority Whip: Katherine Clark (MA 5)
- Caucus Chairman: Pete Aguilar (CA 33)
- Caucus Vice Chairman: Ted Lieu (CA 36)
- Assistant Democratic Leader:
  - Jim Clyburn (SC 6), until February 14, 2024
  - Joe Neguse (CO 2), since March 20, 2024
- Minority Senior Chief Deputy Whip: Jan Schakowsky (IL 9)
- Chair of the Democratic Congressional Campaign Committee: Suzan DelBene (WA 1)
- Chair of the Democratic Policy and Communications Committee:
  - Joe Neguse (CO 2), until March 20, 2024
  - Debbie Dingell (MI 6), since April 16, 2024
- House Democratic Freshman Class Leadership Representative: Jasmine Crockett (TX 30)

== Members ==
=== Senate ===
The numbers refer to their Senate classes. All class 3 seats were contested in the November 2022 elections. In this Congress, class 3 means their term commenced in 2023, requiring re-election in 2028; class 1 means their term ends with this Congress, requiring re-election in 2024; and class 2 means their term began in the last Congress, requiring re-election in 2026.

==== Alabama ====
▌2. Tommy Tuberville (R)
▌3. Katie Britt (R)

==== Alaska ====
▌2. Dan Sullivan (R)
▌3. Lisa Murkowski (R)

==== Arizona ====
▌1. Kyrsten Sinema (I)
▌3. Mark Kelly (D)

==== Arkansas ====
▌2. Tom Cotton (R)
▌3. John Boozman (R)

==== California ====
▌1. Dianne Feinstein (D) (until September 29, 2023)

▌Laphonza Butler (D) (October 3, 2023 – December 8, 2024)
▌Adam Schiff (D) (from December 9, 2024)

▌3. Alex Padilla (D)

==== Colorado ====
▌2. John Hickenlooper (D)
▌3. Michael Bennet (D)

==== Connecticut ====
▌1. Chris Murphy (D)
▌3. Richard Blumenthal (D)

==== Delaware ====
▌1. Tom Carper (D)
▌2. Chris Coons (D)

==== Florida ====
▌1. Rick Scott (R)
▌3. Marco Rubio (R)

==== Georgia ====
▌2. Jon Ossoff (D)
▌3. Raphael Warnock (D)

==== Hawaii ====
▌1. Mazie Hirono (D)
▌3. Brian Schatz (D)

==== Idaho ====
▌2. Jim Risch (R)
▌3. Mike Crapo (R)

==== Illinois ====
▌2. Dick Durbin (D)
▌3. Tammy Duckworth (D)

==== Indiana ====
▌1. Mike Braun (R)
▌3. Todd Young (R)

==== Iowa ====
▌2. Joni Ernst (R)
▌3. Chuck Grassley (R)

==== Kansas ====
▌2. Roger Marshall (R)
▌3. Jerry Moran (R)

==== Kentucky ====
▌2. Mitch McConnell (R)
▌3. Rand Paul (R)

==== Louisiana ====
▌2. Bill Cassidy (R)
▌3. John Kennedy (R)

==== Maine ====
▌1. Angus King (I)
▌2. Susan Collins (R)

==== Maryland ====
▌1. Ben Cardin (D)
▌3. Chris Van Hollen (D)

==== Massachusetts ====
▌1. Elizabeth Warren (D)
▌2. Ed Markey (D)

==== Michigan ====
▌1. Debbie Stabenow (D)
▌2. Gary Peters (D)

==== Minnesota ====
▌1. Amy Klobuchar (DFL) (Note: The Minnesota Democratic–Farmer–Labor Party (DFL) is the Minnesota affiliate of the U.S. Democratic Party and its members are counted as Democrats.)
▌2. Tina Smith (DFL)

==== Mississippi ====
▌1. Roger Wicker (R)
▌2. Cindy Hyde-Smith (R)

==== Missouri ====
▌1. Josh Hawley (R)
▌3. Eric Schmitt (R)

==== Montana ====
▌1. Jon Tester (D)
▌2. Steve Daines (R)

==== Nebraska ====
▌1. Deb Fischer (R)
▌2. Ben Sasse (R) (until January 8, 2023)

▌ Pete Ricketts (R) (from January 23, 2023)

==== Nevada ====
▌1. Jacky Rosen (D)
▌3. Catherine Cortez Masto (D)

==== New Hampshire ====
▌2. Jeanne Shaheen (D)
▌3. Maggie Hassan (D)

==== New Jersey ====
▌1. Bob Menendez (D) (until August 20, 2024)

▌ George Helmy (D) (September 9, 2024 – December 8, 2024)
▌ Andy Kim (D) (from December 9, 2024)

▌2. Cory Booker (D)

==== New Mexico ====
▌1. Martin Heinrich (D)
▌2. Ben Ray Luján (D)

==== New York ====
▌1. Kirsten Gillibrand (D)
▌3. Chuck Schumer (D)

==== North Carolina ====
▌2. Thom Tillis (R)
▌3. Ted Budd (R)

==== North Dakota ====
▌1. Kevin Cramer (R)
▌3. John Hoeven (R)

==== Ohio ====
▌1. Sherrod Brown (D)
▌3. JD Vance (R)

==== Oklahoma ====
▌2. Markwayne Mullin (R)
▌3. James Lankford (R)

==== Oregon ====
▌2. Jeff Merkley (D)
▌3. Ron Wyden (D)

==== Pennsylvania ====
▌1. Bob Casey Jr. (D)
▌3. John Fetterman (D)

==== Rhode Island ====
▌1. Sheldon Whitehouse (D)
▌2. Jack Reed (D)

==== South Carolina ====
▌2. Lindsey Graham (R)
▌3. Tim Scott (R)

==== South Dakota ====
▌2. Mike Rounds (R)
▌3. John Thune (R)

==== Tennessee ====
▌1. Marsha Blackburn (R)
▌2. Bill Hagerty (R)

==== Texas ====
▌1. Ted Cruz (R)
▌2. John Cornyn (R)

==== Utah ====
▌1. Mitt Romney (R)
▌3. Mike Lee (R)

==== Vermont ====
▌1. Bernie Sanders (I)
▌3. Peter Welch (D)

==== Virginia ====
▌1. Tim Kaine (D)
▌2. Mark Warner (D)

==== Washington ====
▌1. Maria Cantwell (D)
▌3. Patty Murray (D)

==== West Virginia ====
▌▌1. Joe Manchin (D until May 31, 2024, then I)
▌2. Shelley Moore Capito (R)

==== Wisconsin ====
▌1. Tammy Baldwin (D)
▌3. Ron Johnson (R)

==== Wyoming ====
▌1. John Barrasso (R)
▌2. Cynthia Lummis (R)

2 Democrats (21 states) 1 Democrat and 1 Independent who caucuses with Democrats (2 states) 1 Democrat and 1 Republican (4 states) 1 Republican and 1 Independent who caucuses with Democrats (1 state) 2 Republicans (22 states)

Senate majority leadership

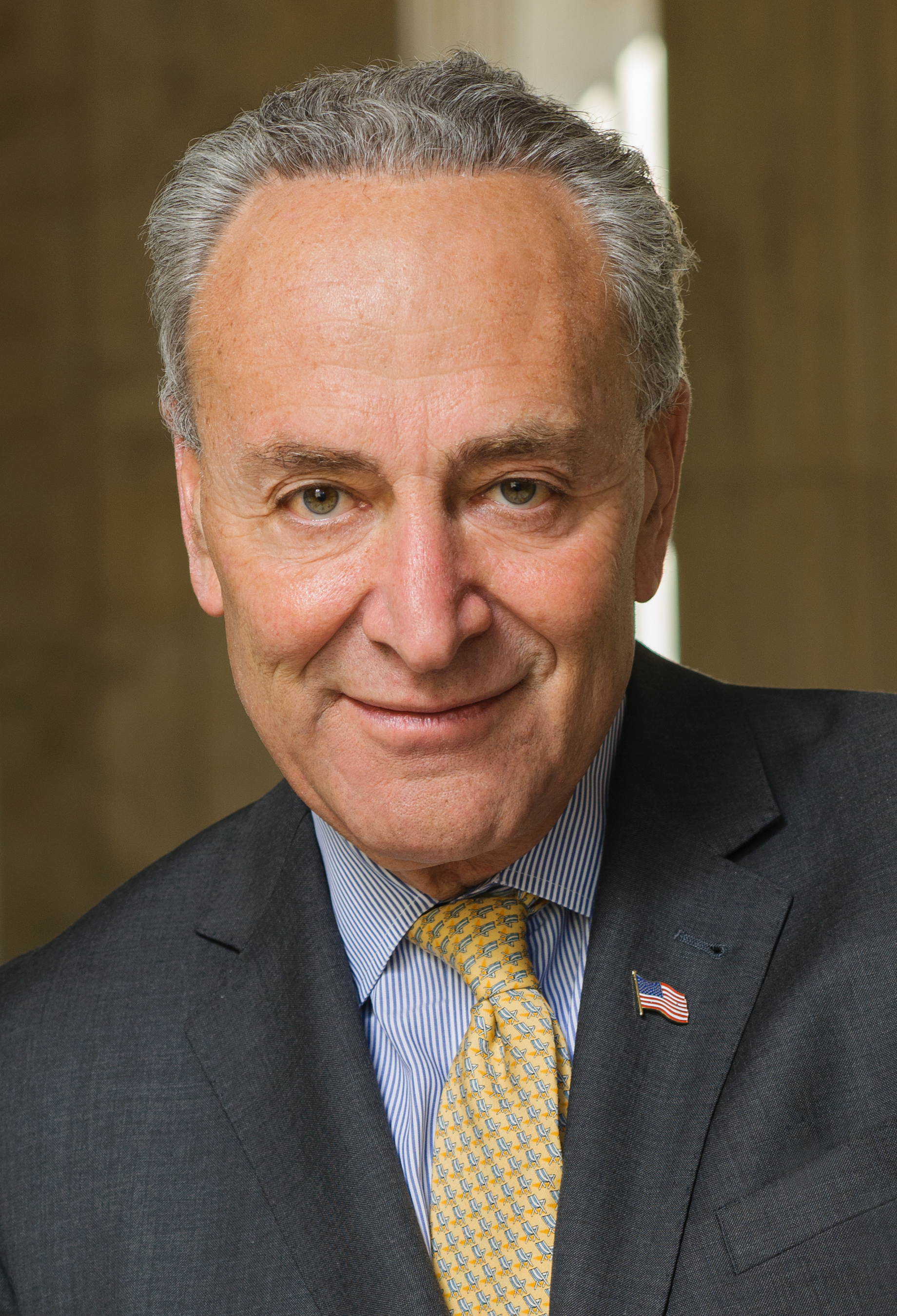
Democratic leader
Chuck Schumer

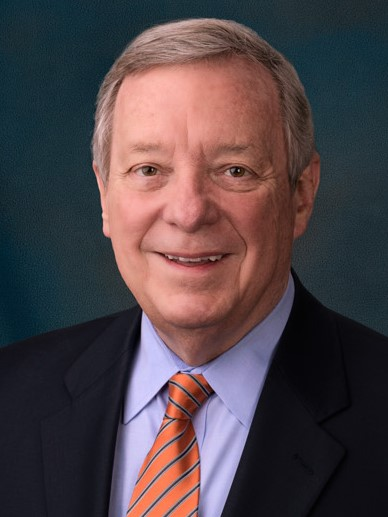
Democratic whip
Dick Durbin

Senate minority leadership

Republican leader
Mitch McConnell

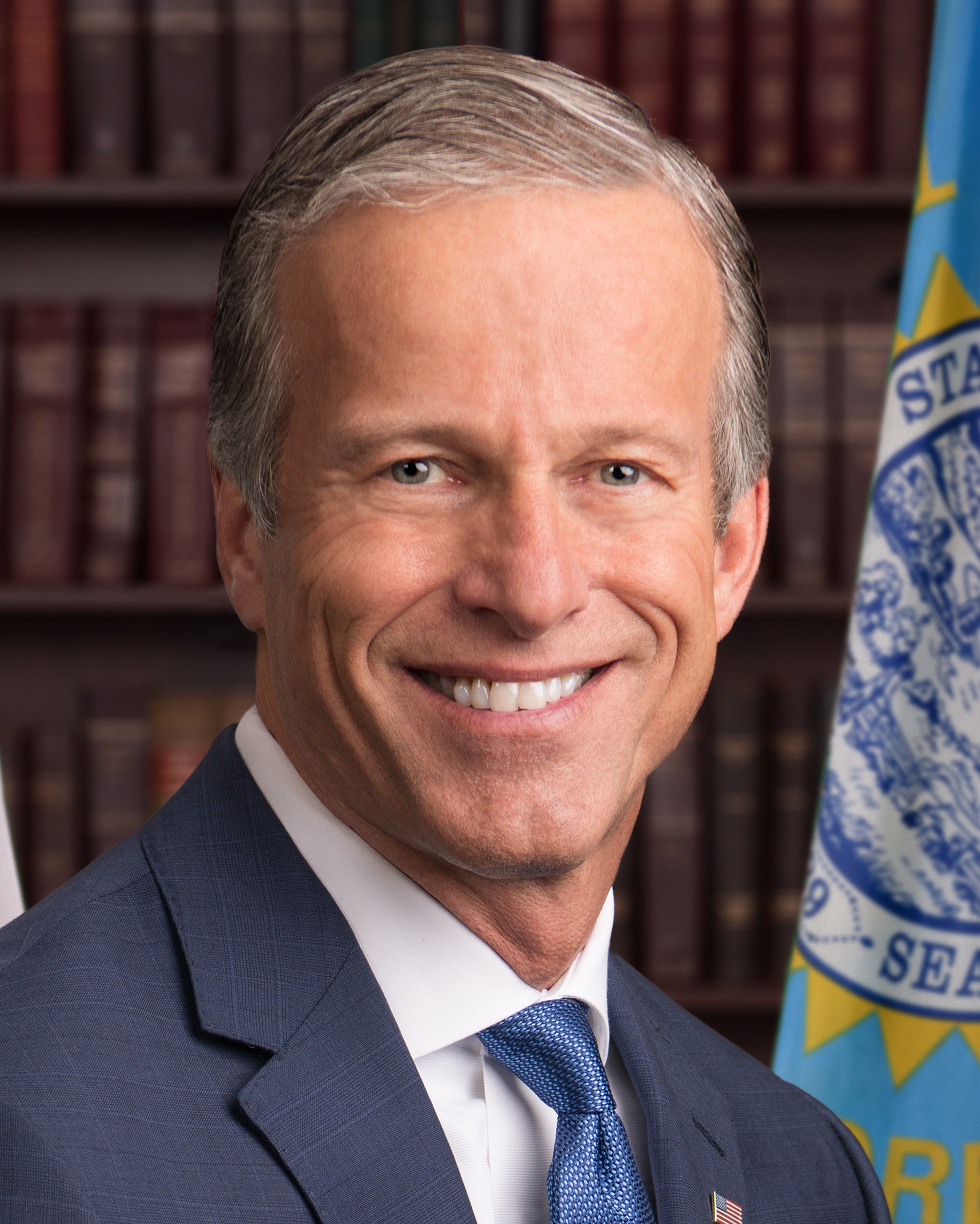
Republican whip
John Thune

=== House of Representatives ===
All 435 seats were filled by election in November 2022. Additionally, six non-voting members were elected from the American territories and Washington, D.C. (Note: Puerto Rico's non-voting member, the Resident Commissioner, is elected every four years. Jenniffer González was last elected in 2020.)

The numbers refer to the congressional district of the given state in this Congress. Eight new congressional districts were created or re-created, while eight others were eliminated, as a result of the 2020 United States census. (Note: The new districts created were: Colorado's 8th; Florida's 28th; North Carolina's 14th; Oregon's 6th; Texas's 37th; Texas's 38th. The districts re-created were: Montana's 1st; Montana's 2nd.) (Note: The eliminated districts were: California's 53rd; Illinois's 18th; Michigan's 14th; Montana's at-large; New York's 27th; Ohio's 16th; Pennsylvania's 18th; West Virginia's 3rd.)

==== Alabama ====
▌1. Jerry Carl (R)
▌2. Barry Moore (R)
▌3. Mike Rogers (R)
▌4. Robert Aderholt (R)
▌5. Dale Strong (R)
▌6. Gary Palmer (R)
▌7. Terri Sewell (D)

==== Alaska ====
▌At-large. Mary Peltola (D)

==== Arizona ====
▌1. David Schweikert (R)
▌2. Eli Crane (R)
▌3. Ruben Gallego (D)
▌4. Greg Stanton (D)
▌5. Andy Biggs (R)
▌6. Juan Ciscomani (R)
▌7. Raúl Grijalva (D)
▌8. Debbie Lesko (R)
▌9. Paul Gosar (R)

==== Arkansas ====
▌1. Rick Crawford (R)
▌2. French Hill (R)
▌3. Steve Womack (R)
▌4. Bruce Westerman (R)

==== California ====
▌1. Doug LaMalfa (R)
▌2. Jared Huffman (D)
▌3. Kevin Kiley (R)
▌4. Mike Thompson (D)
▌5. Tom McClintock (R)
▌6. Ami Bera (D)
▌7. Doris Matsui (D)
▌8. John Garamendi (D)
▌9. Josh Harder (D)
▌10. Mark DeSaulnier (D)
▌11. Nancy Pelosi (D)
▌12. Barbara Lee (D)
▌13. John Duarte (R)
▌14. Eric Swalwell (D)
▌15. Kevin Mullin (D)
▌16. Anna Eshoo (D)
▌17. Ro Khanna (D)
▌18. Zoe Lofgren (D)
▌19. Jimmy Panetta (D)
▌20. Kevin McCarthy (R) (until December 31, 2023)

▌ Vince Fong (R) (from June 3, 2024)

▌21. Jim Costa (D)
▌22. David Valadao (R)
▌23. Jay Obernolte (R)
▌24. Salud Carbajal (D)
▌25. Raul Ruiz (D)
▌26. Julia Brownley (D)
▌27. Mike Garcia (R)
▌28. Judy Chu (D)
▌29. Tony Cárdenas (D)
▌30. Adam Schiff (D) (until December 8, 2024)

▌ Vacant

▌31. Grace Napolitano (D)
▌32. Brad Sherman (D)
▌33. Pete Aguilar (D)
▌34. Jimmy Gomez (D)
▌35. Norma Torres (D)
▌36. Ted Lieu (D)
▌37. Sydney Kamlager-Dove (D)
▌38. Linda Sánchez (D)
▌39. Mark Takano (D)
▌40. Young Kim (R)
▌41. Ken Calvert (R)
▌42. Robert Garcia (D)
▌43. Maxine Waters (D)
▌44. Nanette Barragán (D)
▌45. Michelle Steel (R)
▌46. Lou Correa (D)
▌47. Katie Porter (D)
▌48. Darrell Issa (R)
▌49. Mike Levin (D)
▌50. Scott Peters (D)
▌51. Sara Jacobs (D)
▌52. Juan Vargas (D)

==== Colorado ====
▌1. Diana DeGette (D)
▌2. Joe Neguse (D)
▌3. Lauren Boebert (R)
▌4. Ken Buck (R) (until March 22, 2024)

▌ Greg Lopez (R) (from July 8, 2024)

▌5. Doug Lamborn (R)
▌6. Jason Crow (D)
▌7. Brittany Pettersen (D)
▌8. Yadira Caraveo (D)

==== Connecticut ====
▌1. John B. Larson (D)
▌2. Joe Courtney (D)
▌3. Rosa DeLauro (D)
▌4. Jim Himes (D)
▌5. Jahana Hayes (D)

==== Delaware ====
▌At-large. Lisa Blunt Rochester (D)

==== Florida ====
▌1. Matt Gaetz (R) (until November 13, 2024)

▌ Vacant

▌2. Neal Dunn (R)
▌3. Kat Cammack (R)
▌4. Aaron Bean (R)
▌5. John Rutherford (R)
▌6. Mike Waltz (R)
▌7. Cory Mills (R)
▌8. Bill Posey (R)
▌9. Darren Soto (D)
▌10. Maxwell Frost (D)
▌11. Daniel Webster (R)
▌12. Gus Bilirakis (R)
▌13. Anna Paulina Luna (R)
▌14. Kathy Castor (D)
▌15. Laurel Lee (R)
▌16. Vern Buchanan (R)
▌17. Greg Steube (R)
▌18. Scott Franklin (R)
▌19. Byron Donalds (R)
▌20. Sheila Cherfilus-McCormick (D)
▌21. Brian Mast (R)
▌22. Lois Frankel (D)
▌23. Jared Moskowitz (D)
▌24. Frederica Wilson (D)
▌25. Debbie Wasserman Schultz (D)
▌26. Mario Díaz-Balart (R)
▌27. María Elvira Salazar (R)
▌28. Carlos A. Giménez (R)

==== Georgia ====
▌1. Buddy Carter (R)
▌2. Sanford Bishop (D)
▌3. Drew Ferguson (R)
▌4. Hank Johnson (D)
▌5. Nikema Williams (D)
▌6. Rich McCormick (R)
▌7. Lucy McBath (D)
▌8. Austin Scott (R)
▌9. Andrew Clyde (R)
▌10. Mike Collins (R)
▌11. Barry Loudermilk (R)
▌12. Rick Allen (R)
▌13. David Scott (D)
▌14. Marjorie Taylor Greene (R)

==== Hawaii ====
▌1. Ed Case (D)
▌2. Jill Tokuda (D)

==== Idaho ====
▌1. Russ Fulcher (R)
▌2. Mike Simpson (R)

==== Illinois ====
▌1. Jonathan Jackson (D)
▌2. Robin Kelly (D)
▌3. Delia Ramirez (D)
▌4. Chuy García (D)
▌5. Mike Quigley (D)
▌6. Sean Casten (D)
▌7. Danny Davis (D)
▌8. Raja Krishnamoorthi (D)
▌9. Jan Schakowsky (D)
▌10. Brad Schneider (D)
▌11. Bill Foster (D)
▌12. Mike Bost (R)
▌13. Nikki Budzinski (D)
▌14. Lauren Underwood (D)
▌15. Mary Miller (R)
▌16. Darin LaHood (R)
▌17. Eric Sorensen (D)

==== Indiana ====
▌1. Frank J. Mrvan (D)
▌2. Rudy Yakym (R)
▌3. Jim Banks (R)
▌4. Jim Baird (R)
▌5. Victoria Spartz (R)
▌6. Greg Pence (R)
▌7. André Carson (D)
▌8. Larry Bucshon (R)
▌9. Erin Houchin (R)

==== Iowa ====
▌1. Mariannette Miller-Meeks (R)
▌2. Ashley Hinson (R)
▌3. Zach Nunn (R)
▌4. Randy Feenstra (R)

==== Kansas ====
▌1. Tracey Mann (R)
▌2. Jake LaTurner (R)
▌3. Sharice Davids (D)
▌4. Ron Estes (R)

==== Kentucky ====
▌1. James Comer (R)
▌2. Brett Guthrie (R)
▌3. Morgan McGarvey (D)
▌4. Thomas Massie (R)
▌5. Hal Rogers (R)
▌6. Andy Barr (R)

==== Louisiana ====
▌1. Steve Scalise (R)
▌2. Troy Carter (D)
▌3. Clay Higgins (R)
▌4. Mike Johnson (R)
▌5. Julia Letlow (R)
▌6. Garret Graves (R)

==== Maine ====
▌1. Chellie Pingree (D)
▌2. Jared Golden (D)

==== Maryland ====
▌1. Andy Harris (R)
▌2. Dutch Ruppersberger (D)
▌3. John Sarbanes (D)
▌4. Glenn Ivey (D)
▌5. Steny Hoyer (D)
▌6. David Trone (D)
▌7. Kweisi Mfume (D)
▌8. Jamie Raskin (D)

==== Massachusetts ====
▌1. Richard Neal (D)
▌2. Jim McGovern (D)
▌3. Lori Trahan (D)
▌4. Jake Auchincloss (D)
▌5. Katherine Clark (D)
▌6. Seth Moulton (D)
▌7. Ayanna Pressley (D)
▌8. Stephen Lynch (D)
▌9. Bill Keating (D)

==== Michigan ====
▌1. Jack Bergman (R)
▌2. John Moolenaar (R)
▌3. Hillary Scholten (D)
▌4. Bill Huizenga (R)
▌5. Tim Walberg (R)
▌6. Debbie Dingell (D)
▌7. Elissa Slotkin (D)
▌8. Dan Kildee (D)
▌9. Lisa McClain (R)
▌10. John James (R)
▌11. Haley Stevens (D)
▌12. Rashida Tlaib (D)
▌13. Shri Thanedar (D)

==== Minnesota ====
▌1. Brad Finstad (R)
▌2. Angie Craig (DFL)
▌3. Dean Phillips (DFL)
▌4. Betty McCollum (DFL)
▌5. Ilhan Omar (DFL)
▌6. Tom Emmer (R)
▌7. Michelle Fischbach (R)
▌8. Pete Stauber (R)

==== Mississippi ====
▌1. Trent Kelly (R)
▌2. Bennie Thompson (D)
▌3. Michael Guest (R)
▌4. Mike Ezell (R)

==== Missouri ====
▌1. Cori Bush (D)
▌2. Ann Wagner (R)
▌3. Blaine Luetkemeyer (R)
▌4. Mark Alford (R)
▌5. Emanuel Cleaver (D)
▌6. Sam Graves (R)
▌7. Eric Burlison (R)
▌8. Jason Smith (R)

==== Montana ====
▌1. Ryan Zinke (R)
▌2. Matt Rosendale (R)

==== Nebraska ====
▌1. Mike Flood (R)
▌2. Don Bacon (R)
▌3. Adrian Smith (R)

==== Nevada ====
▌1. Dina Titus (D)
▌2. Mark Amodei (R)
▌3. Susie Lee (D)
▌4. Steven Horsford (D)

==== New Hampshire ====
▌1. Chris Pappas (D)
▌2. Annie Kuster (D)

==== New Jersey ====
▌1. Donald Norcross (D)
▌2. Jeff Van Drew (R)
▌3. Andy Kim (D) (until December 8, 2024)

▌ Vacant

▌4. Chris Smith (R)
▌5. Josh Gottheimer (D)
▌6. Frank Pallone (D)
▌7. Thomas Kean Jr. (R)
▌8. Rob Menendez (D)
▌9. Bill Pascrell (D) (until August 21, 2024)

▌Vacant

▌10. Donald Payne Jr. (D) (until April 24, 2024)

▌LaMonica McIver (D) (from September 23, 2024)

▌11. Mikie Sherrill (D)
▌12. Bonnie Watson Coleman (D)

==== New Mexico ====
▌1. Melanie Stansbury (D)
▌2. Gabe Vasquez (D)
▌3. Teresa Leger Fernandez (D)

==== New York ====
▌1. Nick LaLota (R)
▌2. Andrew Garbarino (R)
▌3. George Santos (R) (until December 1, 2023)

▌Tom Suozzi (D) (from February 28, 2024)

▌4. Anthony D'Esposito (R)
▌5. Gregory Meeks (D)
▌6. Grace Meng (D)
▌7. Nydia Velázquez (D)
▌8. Hakeem Jeffries (D)
▌9. Yvette Clarke (D)
▌10. Dan Goldman (D)
▌11. Nicole Malliotakis (R)
▌12. Jerry Nadler (D)
▌13. Adriano Espaillat (D)
▌14. Alexandria Ocasio-Cortez (D)
▌15. Ritchie Torres (D)
▌16. Jamaal Bowman (D)
▌17. Mike Lawler (R)
▌18. Pat Ryan (D)
▌19. Marc Molinaro (R)
▌20. Paul Tonko (D)
▌21. Elise Stefanik (R)
▌22. Brandon Williams (R)
▌23. Nick Langworthy (R)
▌24. Claudia Tenney (R)
▌25. Joseph Morelle (D)
▌26. Brian Higgins (D) (until February 2, 2024)

▌Tim Kennedy (D) (from May 6, 2024)

==== North Carolina ====
▌1. Don Davis (D)
▌2. Deborah Ross (D)
▌3. Greg Murphy (R)
▌4. Valerie Foushee (D)
▌5. Virginia Foxx (R)
▌6. Kathy Manning (D)
▌7. David Rouzer (R)
▌8. Dan Bishop (R)
▌9. Richard Hudson (R)
▌10. Patrick McHenry (R)
▌11. Chuck Edwards (R)
▌12. Alma Adams (D)
▌13. Wiley Nickel (D)
▌14. Jeff Jackson (D) (until December 31, 2024)

▌ Vacant

==== North Dakota ====
▌At-large. Kelly Armstrong (R) (until December 14, 2024)

▌ Vacant

==== Ohio ====
▌1. Greg Landsman (D)
▌2. Brad Wenstrup (R)
▌3. Joyce Beatty (D)
▌4. Jim Jordan (R)
▌5. Bob Latta (R)
▌6. Bill Johnson (R) (until January 21, 2024)

▌ Michael Rulli (R) (from June 25, 2024)

▌7. Max Miller (R)
▌8. Warren Davidson (R)
▌9. Marcy Kaptur (D)
▌10. Mike Turner (R)
▌11. Shontel Brown (D)
▌12. Troy Balderson (R)
▌13. Emilia Sykes (D)
▌14. David Joyce (R)
▌15. Mike Carey (R)

==== Oklahoma ====
▌1. Kevin Hern (R)
▌2. Josh Brecheen (R)
▌3. Frank Lucas (R)
▌4. Tom Cole (R)
▌5. Stephanie Bice (R)

==== Oregon ====
▌1. Suzanne Bonamici (D)
▌2. Cliff Bentz (R)
▌3. Earl Blumenauer (D)
▌4. Val Hoyle (D)
▌5. Lori Chavez-DeRemer (R)
▌6. Andrea Salinas (D)

==== Pennsylvania ====
▌1. Brian Fitzpatrick (R)
▌2. Brendan Boyle (D)
▌3. Dwight Evans (D)
▌4. Madeleine Dean (D)
▌5. Mary Gay Scanlon (D)
▌6. Chrissy Houlahan (D)
▌7. Susan Wild (D)
▌8. Matt Cartwright (D)
▌9. Dan Meuser (R)
▌10. Scott Perry (R)
▌11. Lloyd Smucker (R)
▌12. Summer Lee (D)
▌13. John Joyce (R)
▌14. Guy Reschenthaler (R)
▌15. Glenn Thompson (R)
▌16. Mike Kelly (R)
▌17. Chris Deluzio (D)

==== Rhode Island ====
▌1. David Cicilline (D) (until May 31, 2023)

▌Gabe Amo (D) (from November 13, 2023)

▌2. Seth Magaziner (D)

==== South Carolina ====
▌1. Nancy Mace (R)
▌2. Joe Wilson (R)
▌3. Jeff Duncan (R)
▌4. William Timmons (R)
▌5. Ralph Norman (R)
▌6. Jim Clyburn (D)
▌7. Russell Fry (R)

==== South Dakota ====
▌At-large. Dusty Johnson (R)

==== Tennessee ====
▌1. Diana Harshbarger (R)
▌2. Tim Burchett (R)
▌3. Chuck Fleischmann (R)
▌4. Scott DesJarlais (R)
▌5. Andy Ogles (R)
▌6. John Rose (R)
▌7. Mark Green (R)
▌8. David Kustoff (R)
▌9. Steve Cohen (D)

==== Texas ====
▌1. Nathaniel Moran (R)
▌2. Dan Crenshaw (R)
▌3. Keith Self (R)
▌4. Pat Fallon (R)
▌5. Lance Gooden (R)
▌6. Jake Ellzey (R)
▌7. Lizzie Fletcher (D)
▌8. Morgan Luttrell (R)
▌9. Al Green (D)
▌10. Michael McCaul (R)
▌11. August Pfluger (R)
▌12. Kay Granger (R)
▌13. Ronny Jackson (R)
▌14. Randy Weber (R)
▌15. Monica De La Cruz (R)
▌16. Veronica Escobar (D)
▌17. Pete Sessions (R)
▌18. Sheila Jackson Lee (D) (until July 19, 2024)

▌ Erica Lee Carter (D) (from November 12, 2024)

▌19. Jodey Arrington (R)
▌20. Joaquin Castro (D)
▌21. Chip Roy (R)
▌22. Troy Nehls (R)
▌23. Tony Gonzales (R)
▌24. Beth Van Duyne (R)
▌25. Roger Williams (R)
▌26. Michael C. Burgess (R)
▌27. Michael Cloud (R)
▌28. Henry Cuellar (D)
▌29. Sylvia Garcia (D)
▌30. Jasmine Crockett (D)
▌31. John Carter (R)
▌32. Colin Allred (D)
▌33. Marc Veasey (D)
▌34. Vicente Gonzalez (D)
▌35. Greg Casar (D)
▌36. Brian Babin (R)
▌37. Lloyd Doggett (D)
▌38. Wesley Hunt (R)

==== Utah ====
▌1. Blake Moore (R)
▌2. Chris Stewart (R) (until September 15, 2023)

▌ Celeste Maloy (R) (from November 28, 2023)

▌3. John Curtis (R)
▌4. Burgess Owens (R)

==== Vermont ====
▌At-large. Becca Balint (D)

==== Virginia ====
▌1. Rob Wittman (R)
▌2. Jen Kiggans (R)
▌3. Bobby Scott (D)
▌4. Jennifer McClellan (D) (from March 7, 2023)
▌5. Bob Good (R)
▌6. Ben Cline (R)
▌7. Abigail Spanberger (D)
▌8. Don Beyer (D)
▌9. Morgan Griffith (R)
▌10. Jennifer Wexton (D)
▌11. Gerry Connolly (D)

==== Washington ====
▌1. Suzan DelBene (D)
▌2. Rick Larsen (D)
▌3. Marie Gluesenkamp Perez (D)
▌4. Dan Newhouse (R)
▌5. Cathy McMorris Rodgers (R)
▌6. Derek Kilmer (D)
▌7. Pramila Jayapal (D)
▌8. Kim Schrier (D)
▌9. Adam Smith (D)
▌10. Marilyn Strickland (D)

==== West Virginia ====
▌1. Carol Miller (R)
▌2. Alex Mooney (R)

==== Wisconsin ====
▌1. Bryan Steil (R)
▌2. Mark Pocan (D)
▌3. Derrick Van Orden (R)
▌4. Gwen Moore (D)
▌5. Scott Fitzgerald (R)
▌6. Glenn Grothman (R)
▌7. Tom Tiffany (R)
▌8. Mike Gallagher (R) (until April 20, 2024)

▌ Tony Wied (R) (from November 12, 2024)

==== Wyoming ====
▌At-large. Harriet Hageman (R)

==== Non-voting members ====
▌American Samoa: Amata Coleman Radewagen (R)
▌District of Columbia: Eleanor Holmes Norton (D)
▌Guam: James Moylan (R)
▌Northern Mariana Islands: Gregorio Sablan (D)
▌▌Puerto Rico. Jenniffer González-Colón (PNP/R) (until January 2, 2025)

▌ Vacant

▌United States Virgin Islands: Stacey Plaskett (D)

House composition by district Held by Democrats Held by Republicans Vacant

House seats by party holding majority in state, as of February 28, 2024.: D: / 100% / 80–99% / 70–79% / 60–69% / 51–59% / 50%; R: / 100% / 80–99% / 70–79% / 60–69% / 51–59% / 50%

House majority leadership

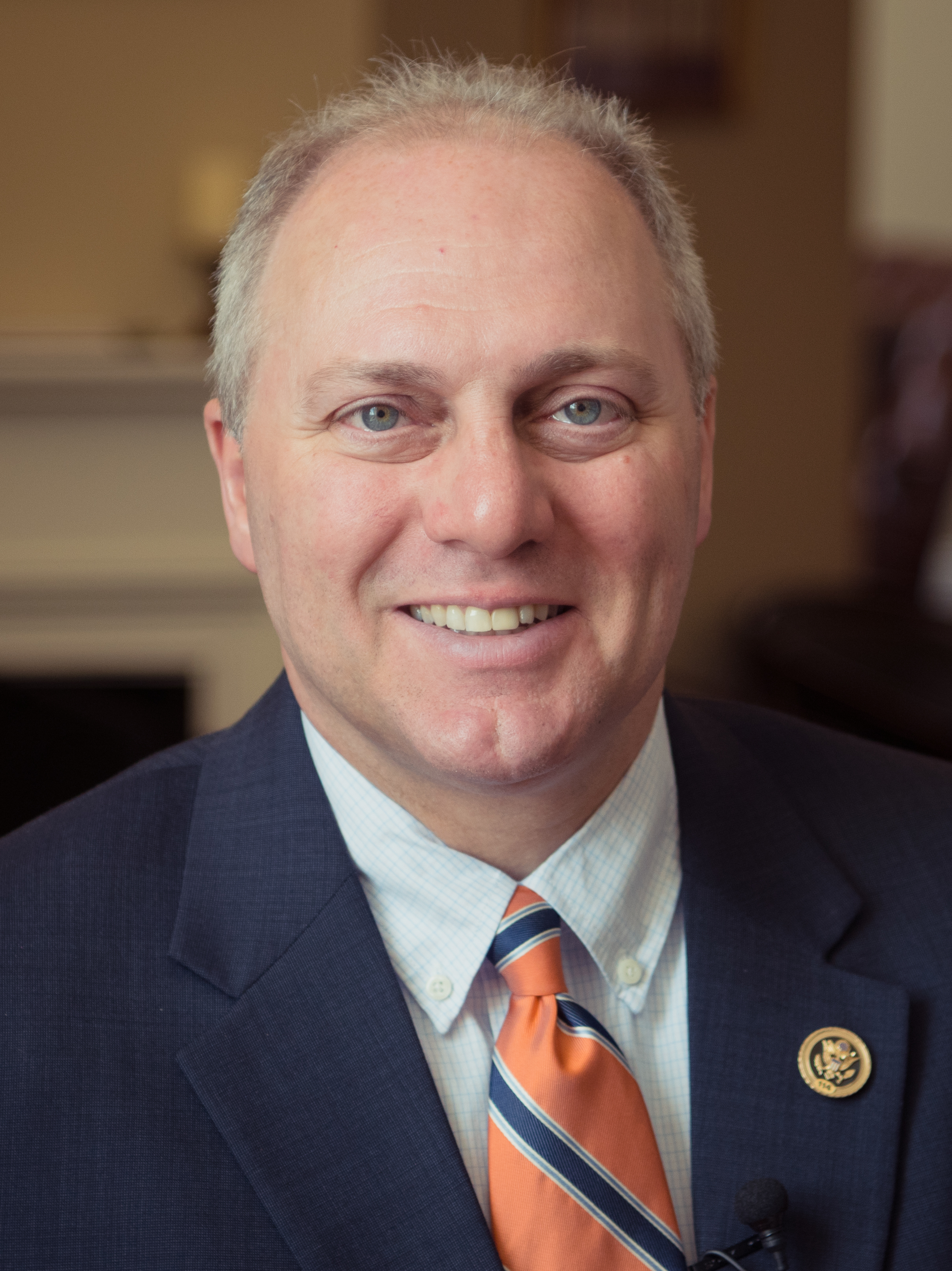
Republican leader
Steve Scalise

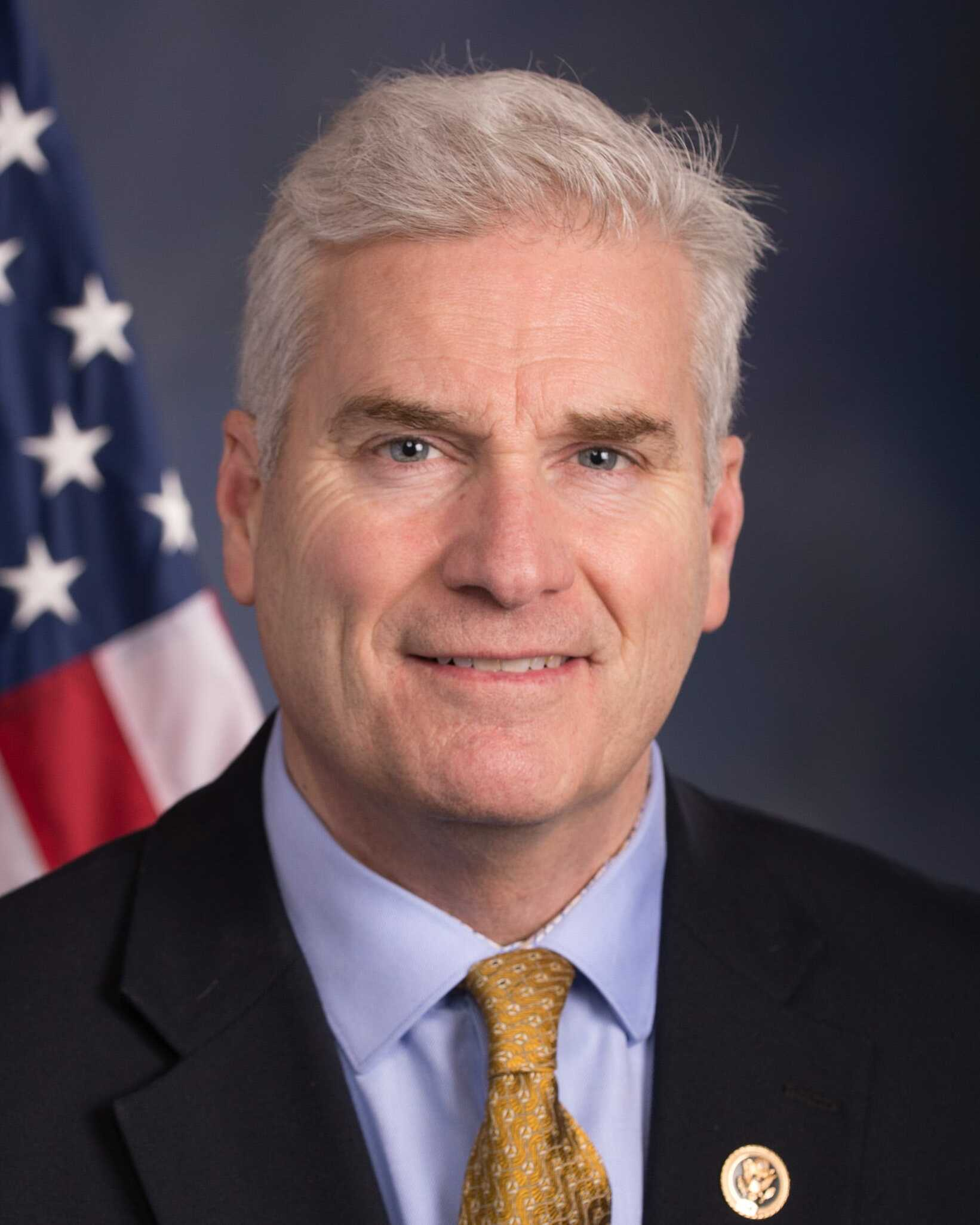
Republican whip
Tom Emmer

House minority leadership

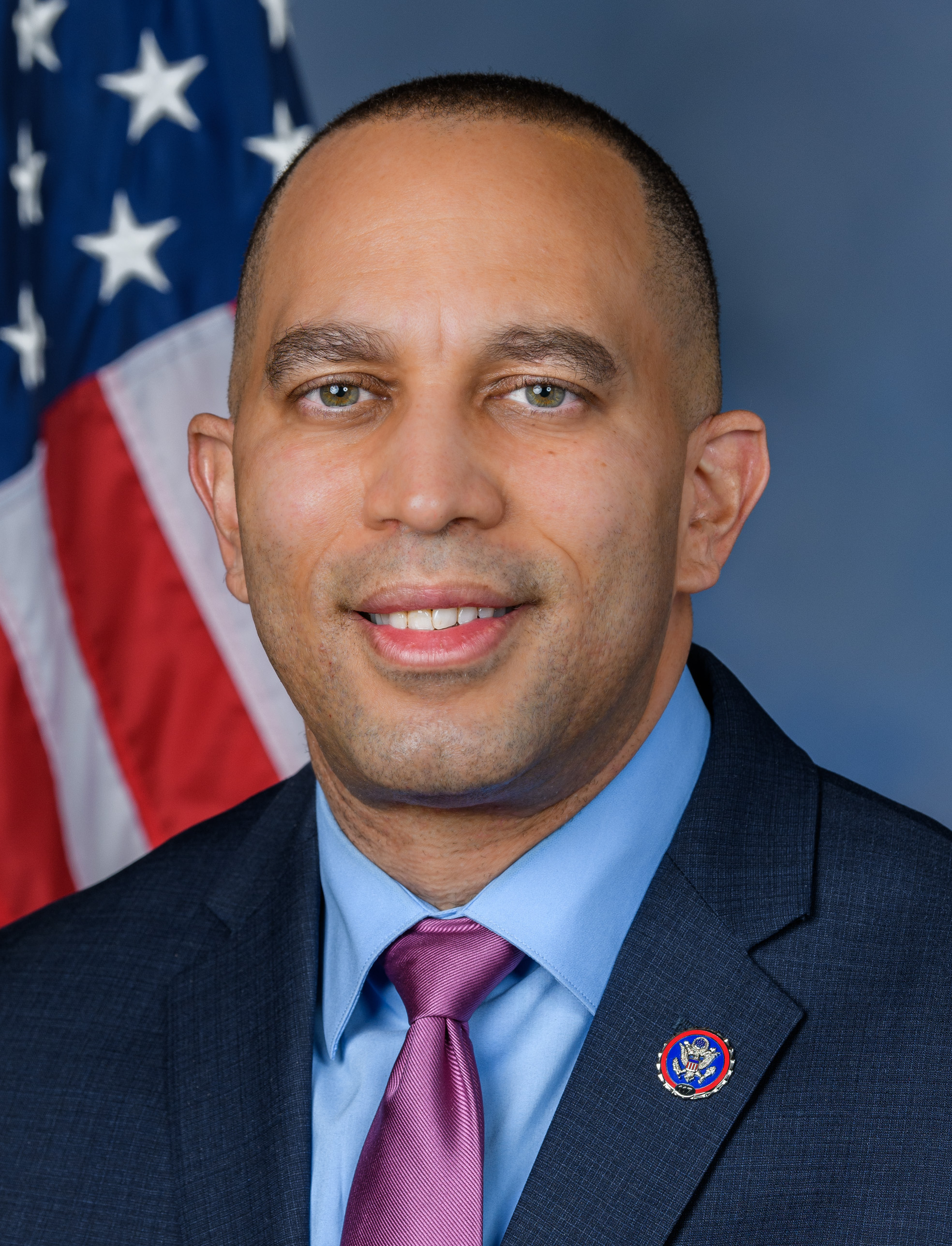
Democratic leader
Hakeem Jeffries

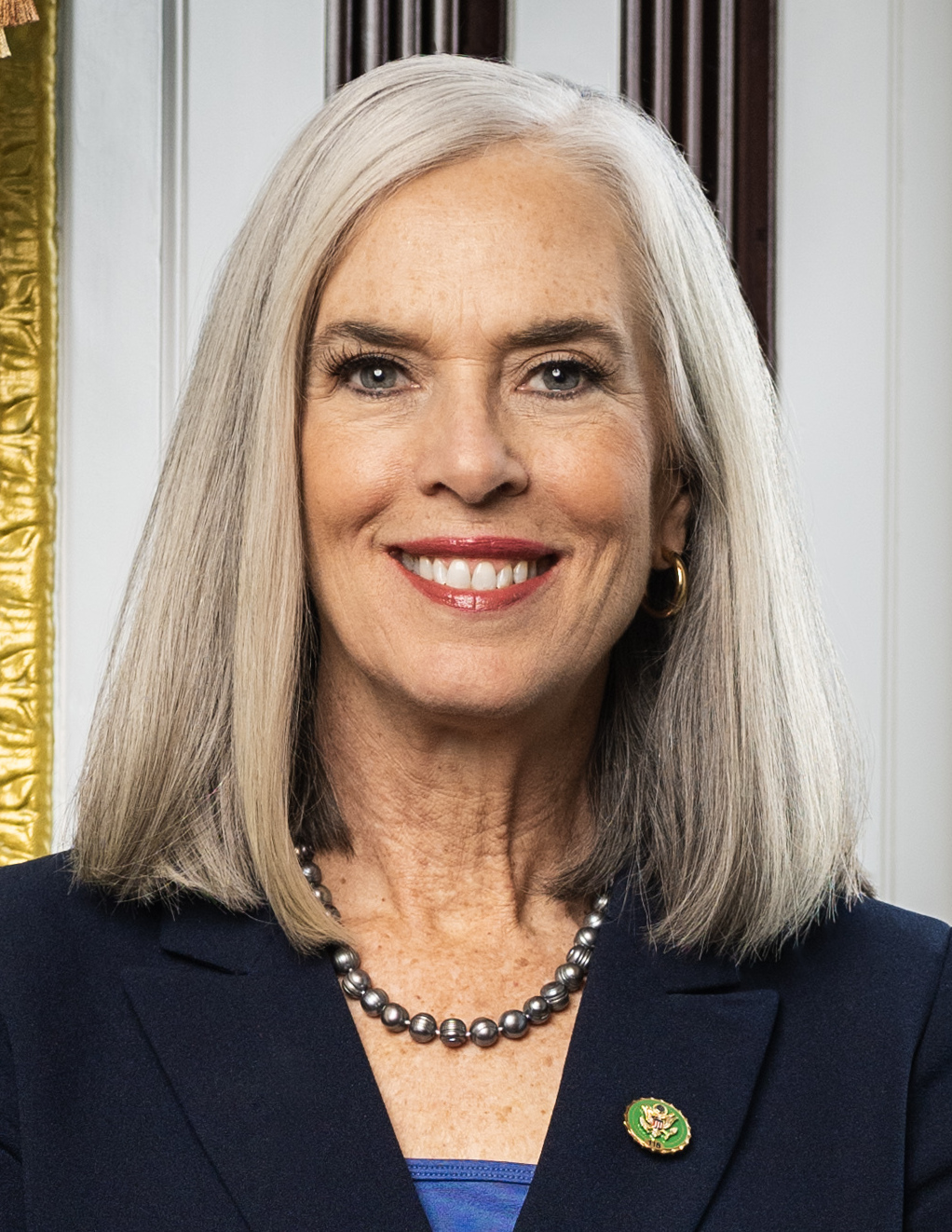
Democratic whip
Katherine Clark

== Changes in membership ==
=== Senate changes ===
Senate changes
State (class)	Vacated by	Reason for change	Successor	Date of successor's formal installation (Note: When seated or oath administered, not necessarily when service began.)
Nebraska (2)	Ben Sasse (R)	Incumbent resigned January 8, 2023, to become the president of the University of Florida. Successor was appointed January 12, 2023, to continue the term. Appointee was later elected to finish the term ending January 3, 2027.	Pete Ricketts (R)	January 23, 2023
California (1)	Dianne Feinstein (D)	Incumbent died September 29, 2023, having already planned to retire at the end of the term. Successor was appointed October 1, 2023, to continue the term.	Laphonza Butler (D)	October 3, 2023
West Virginia (1)	Joe Manchin (D)	Incumbent changed party May 31, 2024.	Joe Manchin (I)	May 31, 2024
New Jersey (1)	Bob Menendez (D)	Incumbent resigned August 20, 2024, due to criminal conviction. Successor was appointed August 23, 2024, to finish the term ending with this Congress.	George Helmy (D)	September 9, 2024
New Jersey (1)	George Helmy (D)	Appointee resigned December 8, 2024, to allow successor to take office early. Successor was appointed December 8, 2024, having already been elected to the next term.	Andy Kim (D)	December 9, 2024
California (1)	Laphonza Butler (D)	Appointee resigned December 8, 2024, to allow successor to take office early. Successor was appointed having already been elected to finish the term ending with this Congress.	Adam Schiff (D)	December 9, 2024

=== House of Representatives changes ===
House changes
District	Vacated by	Reason for change	Successor	Date of successor's formal installation
Virginia 4	Vacant	Incumbent Donald McEachin (D) died November 28, 2022, before the beginning of this Congress. A special election was held on February 21, 2023.	Jennifer McClellan (D)	March 7, 2023
Rhode Island 1	David Cicilline (D)	Incumbent resigned May 31, 2023, to become CEO of the Rhode Island Foundation. A special election was held on November 7, 2023.	Gabe Amo (D)	November 13, 2023
Utah 2	Chris Stewart (R)	Incumbent resigned September 15, 2023, due to his wife's health issues. A special election was held on November 21, 2023.	Celeste Maloy (R)	November 28, 2023
New York 3	George Santos (R)	Incumbent expelled December 1, 2023. A special election was held on February 13, 2024.	Tom Suozzi (D)	February 28, 2024
California 20	Kevin McCarthy (R)	Incumbent resigned December 31, 2023. A special election was held on May 21, 2024.	Vince Fong (R)	June 3, 2024
Ohio 6	Bill Johnson (R)	Incumbent resigned January 21, 2024, to become president of Youngstown State University. A special election was held on June 11, 2024.	Michael Rulli (R)	June 25, 2024
New York 26	Brian Higgins (D)	Incumbent resigned February 2, 2024, to become president of Shea's Performing Arts Center. A special election was held on April 30, 2024.	Tim Kennedy (D)	May 6, 2024
Colorado 4	Ken Buck (R)	Incumbent resigned March 22, 2024. A special election was held on June 25, 2024.	Greg Lopez (R)	July 8, 2024
Wisconsin 8	Mike Gallagher (R)	Incumbent resigned April 20, 2024. A special election was held on November 5, 2024.	Tony Wied (R)	November 12, 2024
New Jersey 10	Donald Payne Jr. (D)	Incumbent died April 24, 2024. A special election was held on September 18, 2024.	LaMonica McIver (D)	September 23, 2024
Texas 18	Sheila Jackson Lee (D)	Incumbent died July 19, 2024. A special election was held on November 5, 2024.	Erica Lee Carter (D)	November 12, 2024
New Jersey 9	Bill Pascrell (D)	Incumbent died August 21, 2024.	Vacant until the next Congress	
Florida 1	Matt Gaetz (R)	Incumbent resigned November 13, 2024, after being nominated for U.S. Attorney General, but withdrew from consideration on November 21, 2024.	Vacant until the next Congress	
New Jersey 3	Andy Kim (D)	Incumbent resigned December 8, 2024, to succeed appointed Senator George Helmy after winning the 2024 election.	Vacant until the next Congress	
California 30	Adam Schiff (D)	Incumbent resigned December 8, 2024, to succeed appointed Senator Laphonza Butler after winning the 2024 special election.	Vacant until the next Congress	
North Dakota at-large	Kelly Armstrong (R)	Incumbent resigned December 14, 2024, after being elected Governor of North Dakota.	Vacant until the next Congress	
North Carolina 14	Jeff Jackson (D)	Incumbent resigned December 31, 2024, after being elected Attorney General of North Carolina.	Vacant until the next Congress	
Puerto Rico at-large	Jenniffer González-Colón (NPP/R)	Incumbent resigned January 2, 2025, after being elected Governor of Puerto Rico.	Vacant until the next Congress	

== Committees ==
Section contents: Senate, House, Joint

=== Senate committees ===
==== Standing committees ====
Committee	Chair	Ranking Member/Vice Chair
Agriculture, Nutrition and Forestry	Debbie Stabenow (D-MI)	John Boozman (R-AR)
Appropriations	Patty Murray (D-WA)	Susan Collins (R-ME)
Armed Services	Jack Reed (D-RI)	Roger Wicker (R-MS)
Banking, Housing and Urban Affairs	Sherrod Brown (D-OH)	Tim Scott (R-SC)
Budget	Sheldon Whitehouse (D-RI)	Chuck Grassley (R-IA)
Commerce, Science and Transportation	Maria Cantwell (D-WA)	Ted Cruz (R-TX)
Energy and Natural Resources	Joe Manchin (I-WV) (Democrat until May 31, 2024)	John Barrasso (R-WY)
Environment and Public Works	Tom Carper (D-DE)	Shelley Moore Capito (R-WV)
Finance	Ron Wyden (D-OR)	Mike Crapo (R-ID)
Foreign Relations	Bob Menendez (D-NJ) until September 22, 2023; Ben Cardin (D-MD) from September 25, 2023	Jim Risch (R-ID)
Health, Education, Labor and Pensions	Bernie Sanders (I-VT)	Bill Cassidy (R-LA)
Homeland Security and Governmental Affairs	Gary Peters (D-MI)	Rand Paul (R-KY)
Judiciary	Dick Durbin (D-IL)	Lindsey Graham (R-SC)
Rules and Administration	Amy Klobuchar (D-MN)	Deb Fischer (R-NE)
Small Business and Entrepreneurship	Ben Cardin (D-MD) until September 25, 2023; Jeanne Shaheen (D-NH) from September 27, 2023	Joni Ernst (R-IA)
Veterans' Affairs	Jon Tester (D-MT)	Jerry Moran (R-KS)

==== Select, permanent select and special committees ====
Committee	Chair	Ranking Member/Vice Chair
Aging (Special)	Bob Casey Jr. (D-PA)	Mike Braun (R-IN)
Ethics (Select)	Chris Coons (D-DE)	James Lankford (R-OK)
Indian Affairs (Permanent Select)	Brian Schatz (D-HI)	Lisa Murkowski (R-AK)
Intelligence (Select)	Mark Warner (D-VA)	Marco Rubio (R-FL)
International Narcotics Control (Permanent Caucus)	Sheldon Whitehouse (D-RI)	Chuck Grassley (R-IA)

=== House of Representatives committees ===
Committee	Chair	Ranking Member
Agriculture	Glenn Thompson (R-PA)	David Scott (D-GA)
Appropriations	Kay Granger (R-TX) until April 10, 2024; Tom Cole (R-OK) from April 10, 2024	Rosa DeLauro (D-CT)
Armed Services	Mike Rogers (R-AL)	Adam Smith (D-WA)
Budget	Jodey Arrington (R-TX)	Brendan Boyle (D-PA)
Education and the Workforce	Virginia Foxx (R-NC)	Bobby Scott (D-VA)
Energy and Commerce	Cathy McMorris Rodgers (R-WA)	Frank Pallone (D-NJ)
Ethics	Michael Guest (R-MS)	Susan Wild (D-PA)
Financial Services	Patrick McHenry (R-NC)	Maxine Waters (D-CA)
Foreign Affairs	Michael McCaul (R-TX)	Gregory Meeks (D-NY)
Homeland Security	Mark Green (R-TN)	Bennie Thompson (D-MS)
House Administration	Bryan Steil (R-WI)	Joe Morelle (D-NY)
Intelligence (Permanent Select)	Mike Turner (R-OH)	Jim Himes (D-CT)
Judiciary	Jim Jordan (R-OH)	Jerry Nadler (D-NY)
Natural Resources	Bruce Westerman (R-AR)	Raúl Grijalva (D-AZ)
Oversight and Reform	James Comer (R-KY)	Jamie Raskin (D-MD)
Rules	Tom Cole (R-OK) until April 10, 2024; Michael C. Burgess (R-TX) from April 10, 2024	Jim McGovern (D-MA)
Science, Space and Technology	Frank Lucas (R- OK)	Zoe Lofgren (D-CA)
Small Business	Roger Williams (R-TX)	Nydia Velázquez (D-NY)
Transportation and Infrastructure	Sam Graves (R-MO)	Rick Larsen (D-WA)
Veterans' Affairs	Mike Bost (R-IL)	Mark Takano (D-CA)
Ways and Means	Jason Smith (R-MO)	Richard Neal (D-MA)

=== Joint committees ===
Committee	Chair	Vice Chair	Ranking Member	Vice Ranking Member
Economic	Sen. Martin Heinrich (D-NM)	Rep. David Schweikert (R-AZ)	Rep. Don Beyer (D-VA)	Sen. Mike Lee (R-UT)
Inaugural Ceremonies (Special)	Sen. Amy Klobuchar (D-MN)	Rep. Mike Johnson (R-LA)	Rep. Hakeem Jeffries (D-NY)	Sen. Deb Fischer (R-NE)
Library	Sen. Amy Klobuchar (D-MN)	Rep. Bryan Steil (R-WI)	Rep. Joe Morelle (D-NY)	Sen. Deb Fischer (R-NE)
Printing	Rep. Bryan Steil (R-WI)	Sen. Amy Klobuchar (D-MN)	Sen. Deb Fischer (R-NE)	Rep. Joe Morelle (D-NY)
Taxation (Note: The Joint Taxation Committee leadership rotate the chair and vice chair and the ranking members between the House and Senate at the start of each session in the middle of the congressional term. The first session leadership is shown here.)	Rep. Jason Smith (R-MO)	Sen. Ron Wyden (D-OR)	Sen. Mike Crapo (R-ID)	Rep. Richard Neal (D-MA)

== Officers and officials ==
=== Congressional officers ===
- Architect of the Capitol:
  - Brett Blanton (until February 13, 2023)
  - Thomas Austin (from June 24, 2024)
- Attending Physician: Brian P. Monahan

=== Senate officers ===
- Chaplain: Barry Black (Seventh-day Adventist)
- Curator: Melinda Smith
- Historian: Betty Koed
- Librarian: Meghan Dunn
- Parliamentarian: Elizabeth MacDonough
- Secretary: Sonceria Berry
- Sergeant at Arms and Doorkeeper: Karen Gibson

=== House of Representatives officers ===
- Chaplain: Margaret G. Kibben (Presbyterian)
- Chief Administrative Officer: Catherine Szpindor
- Clerk:
  - Cheryl Johnson (until June 30, 2023)
  - Kevin McCumber (from July 1, 2023)
- Historian: Matthew Wasniewski
- Parliamentarian: Jason Smith
- Reading Clerks: Tylease Alli (D) and Susan Cole (R)
- Sergeant at Arms: William McFarland

== See also ==
- List of new members of the 118th United States Congress
- 2022 United States elections (elections leading to this Congress)
  - 2022 United States Senate elections
  - 2022 United States House of Representatives elections
  - 2023 United States House of Representatives elections (specials during this Congress)
- 2024 United States elections (elections during this Congress, leading to the next Congress)
  - 2024 United States Senate elections
  - 2024 United States House of Representatives elections
