= International sanctions during the Russian invasion of Ukraine =

Economic measures against Russia and Belarus since 2022

Following the full declaration of the Russian invasion of Ukraine, which started on 24 February 2022, institutions such as the United States, the European Union, and other Western countries introduced or significantly expanded sanctions covering Russian president Vladimir Putin, other government members and Russian citizens in general. Some Russian banks were banned from using the SWIFT international payments system. The sanctions and the boycotts of Russia and Belarus have impacted the Russian economy in various ways. Nevertheless, Russian authorities have mitigated the impact of sanctions by procuring essential goods from consumer products that are rarely subject to export restrictions, by exploiting globalized supply chains, and by turning toward trading partners who have ignored Western sanctions, such as China, India, Turkey and the UAE.

== Background ==
=== History of sanctions ===
U.S. president Joe Biden's statements and a short question and answer session on 24 February 2022

Western countries and others imposed sanctions on Russia after it recognised the independence of its occupied territories, the so-called Donetsk and Luhansk People's Republics, on 21 February 2022, in a speech by Vladimir Putin. The sanctions were wide-ranging, targeting individuals, banks, businesses, monetary exchanges, bank transfers, exports, and imports. They included cutting off major Russian banks from SWIFT, the main network for international payments, although there remained limited accessibility to ensure the continued ability to pay for gas shipments. Sanctions also included asset freezes on the Russian Central Bank, which holded $630 billion in foreign-exchange reserves, to prevent it from offsetting the impact of sanctions. By 1 March, the total amount of Russian assets frozen by sanctions amounted to $1 trillion.

Major multinational companies including Apple, IKEA, ExxonMobil, and General Motors, have individually decided to apply sanctions to Russia. Ukrainian along with U.S. and EU governments have explicitly urged the global private sector to help uphold sanctions, and the EU, UK and Australia have also called on global digital platforms to remove Russian-based web sites. Some multinational companies have disengaged from Russia to comply with sanctions and trade restrictions imposed by home states, but also on their own accord, beyond what was required by law, to avoid the economic and reputational risks associated with maintaining commercial ties with Russia.

Several countries that are historically neutral, such as Switzerland and Singapore, have agreed to partial sanctions. Some countries also applied sanctions to Belarusian organisations and individuals, such as President Alexander Lukashenko, because of Belarus' involvement in the invasion.

In response to the invasion, Germany's chancellor, Olaf Scholz, suspended the Nord Stream 2 pipeline and announced a new policy of energy independence from Russia. In addition, Germany provided arms shipments to Ukraine, the first time that it provided arms to a country at war since the end of World War II. Germany also created a €100 billion fund for additional defence expenditures. German industry shifted from reliance on Russian natural gas to producing more energy from renewable sources, importing gas and more coal to provide power and heating while new power generation facilities could be built.

Upon his arrival for the NATO extraordinary summit in Brussels on 24 March, U.S. president Joe Biden indicated that further economic sanctions would be placed against Russia, including restrictions on the Russian Central Bank's use of gold in transactions and a new round of sanctions that targeted defense companies, the head of Russia's largest bank, and more than 300 members of the Russian State Duma.

On 27 February 2022, Putin responded to the sanctions, and to what he called "aggressive statements" by Western governments, by ordering the country's "deterrence forces"—generally understood to include its nuclear forces—to be put on a "special regime of combat duty". This novel term provoked some confusion as to what exactly was changing, but US officials declared it generally "escalatory". Following sanctions and criticisms of their relations with Russian business, a boycott movement began and many companies and organisations chose to exit Russian or Belarusian markets voluntarily. The boycotts impacted many consumer goods, entertainment, education, technology, and sporting organisations.

The U.S. instituted export controls, a novel sanction focused on restricting Russian access to high-tech components, both hardware and software, made with any parts or intellectual property from the U.S. The sanction required that any person or company that wanted to sell technology, semiconductors, encryption software, lasers, or sensors to Russia request a license, which by default was denied. The enforcement mechanism involved sanctions against the person or company, with the sanctions focused on the shipbuilding, aerospace, and defence industries.

During a speech at the UN General Assembly in New York City on 20 September, French president Emmanuel Macron asked, "who here can defend the idea that the invasion of Ukraine justifies no sanctions?" He purported neutral states to be "indifferent" towards the conflict.

On 9 December, Canada imposed new sanctions on Russia, alleging human rights violations. The decision includes sanctions against 33 current or former senior Russian officials and six entities involved in alleged "systematic human rights violations" against Russian citizens who protested against Russia's invasion of Ukraine.

On 16 December, The EU introduced a ninth package of sanctions against the Russian economy. A spokesperson for the Belgian government said, "It is becoming increasingly difficult to impose sanctions that hit Russia hard enough, without excessive collateral damage to the EU."

Since 2014, the European Union has applied eleven rounds of sanctions against the Russian Federation. The last 11th round of sanctions in June 2023 focused on dual-use items such as computer chips and as well as an attempt to limit ship-to-ship transactions of sanctioned goods. More suspensions of Russian broadcasting licenses in Europe were also announced.

== Sanctions ==
Russia Countries on Russia's "Unfriendly Countries List". Countries and territories on the list have imposed or joined sanctions against Russia.

Western countries and others began imposing limited sanctions on Russia when it recognised the independence of self-declared Donbas republics. With the commencement of attacks on 24 February, a large number of other countries began applying sanctions with the aim of devastating the Russian economy. The sanctions were wide-ranging, targeting individuals, banks, businesses, monetary exchanges, bank transfers, exports, and imports.

After Russia invaded Ukraine on 24 February 2022, two governments that had not previously taken part in sanctions, namely South Korea and non-UN member state Taiwan, engaged in sanctions against Russia. On 28 February 2022, Singapore announced that it will impose banking sanctions against Russia for Ukraine invasion, thus making them the first country in Southeast Asia to impose sanctions upon Russia. The sanctions also included materials that could be used for weapons against Ukraine, as well as electronics, technology devices and related equipment, which were listed in a detailed statement on 5 March.

On 25 February and 1 March, Serbia, Mexico and Brazil announced that they would not be participating in any economic sanctions against Russia.

On 28 February, the Central Bank of Russia was blocked from accessing about $300 billion in foreign-exchange reserves held abroad and the EU imposed sanctions on several Russian oligarchs and politicians. On the same day US Foreign Assets Control (OFAC) prohibited United States persons from engaging in transactions with Central Bank of Russia, Russian Direct Investment Fund (including its predecessor, JSC RDIF, sanctioned previously), the Russian Venture Company, and Kirill Dmitriev, an ally of Vladimir Putin, personally.

Sergei Aleksashenko, the former Russian deputy finance minister, said: "This is a kind of financial nuclear bomb that is falling on Russia." On 1 March, the French finance minister Bruno Le Maire predicted that the West would freeze "almost 1,000 billion dollars" of Russian assets, which would cause a collapse of the Russian economy. By July 2023, Russian assets frozen by the G7 countries and the EU were estimated at $335 billion (€300 billion). On 20 April 2022 the Yermak-McFaul Expert Group on Russian Sanctions arranged by Zelenskyy published an "Action Plan for Strengthening Sanctions against the Russian Federation". The document contained recommendations for the international democratic community regarding further sanctions and economic measures, designed to force the Russian leadership in the shortest possible time to end the war in Ukraine and to punish those who committed war crimes.

In a March interview with 60 Minutes correspondent Sharyn Alfonsi, Daleep Singh, then the U.S. Deputy National Security Advisor, who previously crafted U.S. sanctions in 2014 in response to Russian annexation of Crimea, described the sanctions as the "most severe economic sanctions ever levied on Russia". He added that the U.S. was not "pressing buttons to destroy an economy" and said that the sanctions should have "the power to impose overwhelming costs on your target".

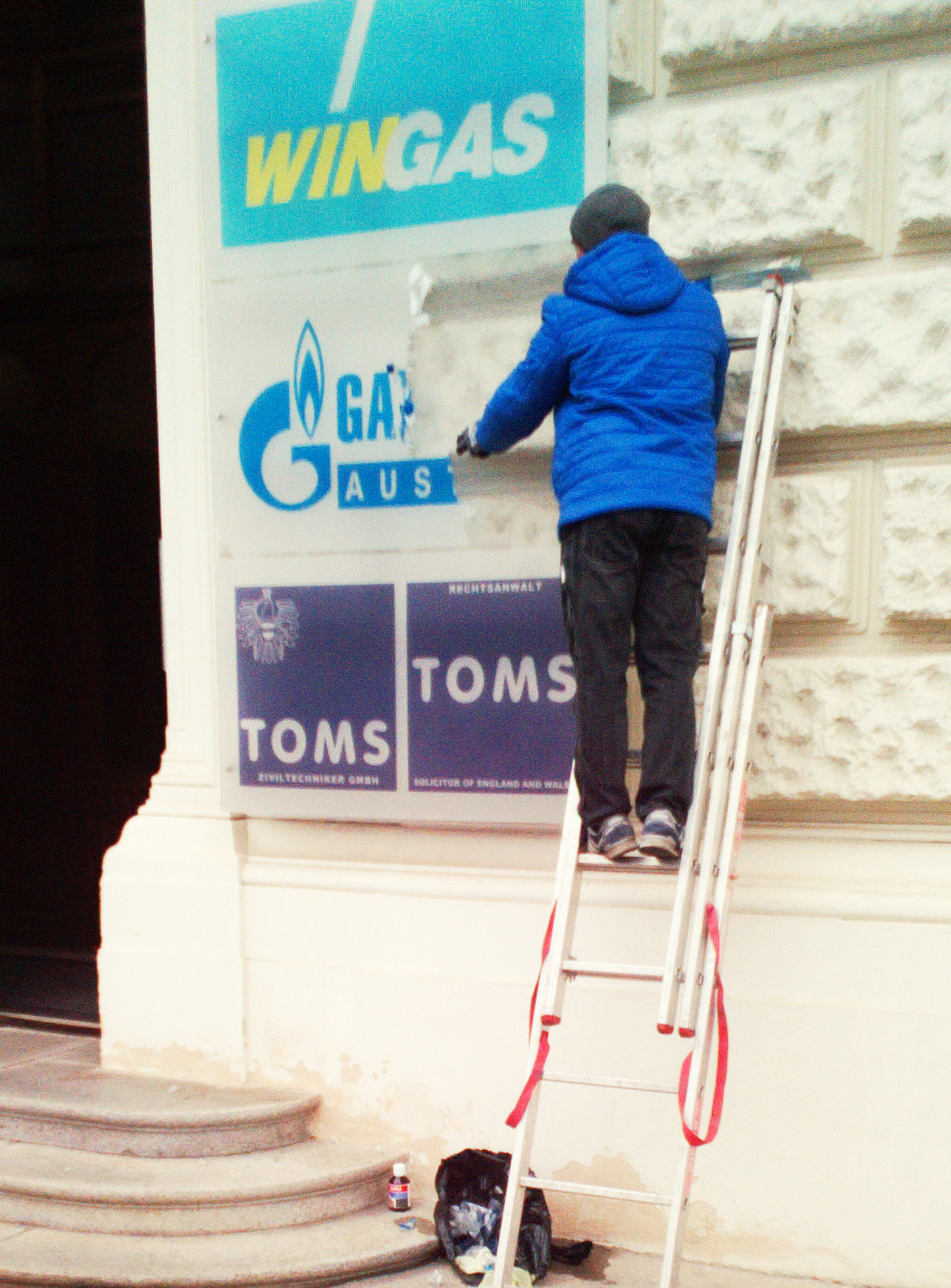
A labourer removes the sign from Gazprom's office in Vienna on 7 March 2022.

On the morning of 24 February, Ursula von der Leyen, the president of the European Commission, announced "massive" EU sanctions to be adopted by the union. The sanctions targeted technological transfers, Russian banks, and Russian assets. Josep Borrell, the High Representative of the Union for Foreign Affairs and Security Policy, stated that Russia would face "unprecedented isolation" as the EU would impose the "harshest package of sanctions [which the union has] ever implemented". He also said that "these are among the darkest hours of Europe since the Second World War". President of the European Parliament Roberta Metsola called for "immediate, quick, solid and swift action" and convened an extraordinary session of Parliament for 1 March.

Since February, the European Union has sanctioned exports to the Russian Federation at a total value of €43.9 billion and imports to the EU worth €91.2 billion, including financial and legal services.

In February 2024, the European Union proposed sanctions that would target Chinese companies aiding Russia's war effort in Ukraine.

=== Fossil fuels and other commodities ===
On 28 February 2022, Canada banned imports of Russian crude oil. On 8 June, Canada banned services to the Russian oil, mining, gas, and chemical industries.

On 8 March, U.S. president Joe Biden ordered a ban on imports of oil, gas and coal from Russia to the United States.

Also on 8 March, Shell announced its intention to withdraw from the Russian hydrocarbons industry.

Switzerland is a major hub for commodities trading globally. As such, about 80% of Russia's commodity trading goes through Geneva and there are an estimated 40 commodities companies linked to Russia in Zug. Glencore, Gunvor, Vitol, Trafigura and Lukoil Litasco SA are oil and commodities trading firms with stakes in Rosneft and Lukoil, two major Russian oil companies. Magnitogorsk Iron and Steel Works (MMK), a Russian-based company in Lugano, is also a major player in commodities/steel trading with Eastern Europe.

In May, the European Commission proposed a ban on oil imports from Russia. The proposal was reduced to a ban on oil imports by sea to appease Hungary, whose prime minister, Viktor Orbán, has befriended Putin and which gets 60% of its oil from Russia via pipelines. European imports of oil supplied by pipeline from Russia are estimated at 800,000 barrels a day and are exempted from the sanctions, with oil transit insurance bans being phased in over several months. Germany and Poland have vowed to end pipeline deliveries. The embargo on crude oil began in December 2022 and oil products in February 2023.

In response to the invasion of Ukraine by Russia, the European Commission and International Energy Agency presented joint plans to reduce reliance on Russian energy, reduce gas imports from Russia by two thirds within a year, and completely by 2030. In April, European Commission president Ursula von der Leyen said "the era of Russian fossil fuels in Europe will come to an end". On 18 May, the European Union published plans to end its reliance on Russian oil, natural gas and coal by 2027.

On 2 September, the G7 group of nations agreed to cap the price of Russian oil in order to reduce Russia's ability to finance its war with Ukraine without further increasing inflation. This was followed by the European Union on 6 October, which in its 8th round of sanctions agreed to put a price cap on Russian oil imports (for Europe and third countries) with a price maximum to be set on 5 December 2022. Several countries, including Hungary and Serbia gained major exemptions from the agreement. According to a U.S. Treasury report published in May 2023 the sanctions were successful in achieving oil supply stability and reducing Russian tax revenue. In August 2023 the price of Russian oil exceeded the cap and reached $73.57 per barrel.

The detrimental effects on European countries from economic sanctions against Russia had been initially valued as insignificant compared to the impact these measures have on the Russian economy. However, after 2022, a number of economists have pointed out that Eastern European countries with more intense economic relations with Russia (and Ukraine) before the conflict, would experience more disruptions to their economies. These 'asymmetric effects' might be considerable, particularly for smaller countries with domestic production, as these international sanctions not only affected the energy industry but also agriculture and manufacturing. After the onset of the armed conflict in 2022, energy prices had skyrocketed, contributing to the 2021/2022 energy crisis. While those energy prices had fallen again in 2023 and shortages, particularly for LNG, had eased, other factors came into play, such as the serious disruption of grain exports through the Black Sea corridor, thus causing a glut of grain in Eastern Europe, depressing prices seriously and endangering the livelihood of local farmers in Poland, Hungary as well as Bulgaria.

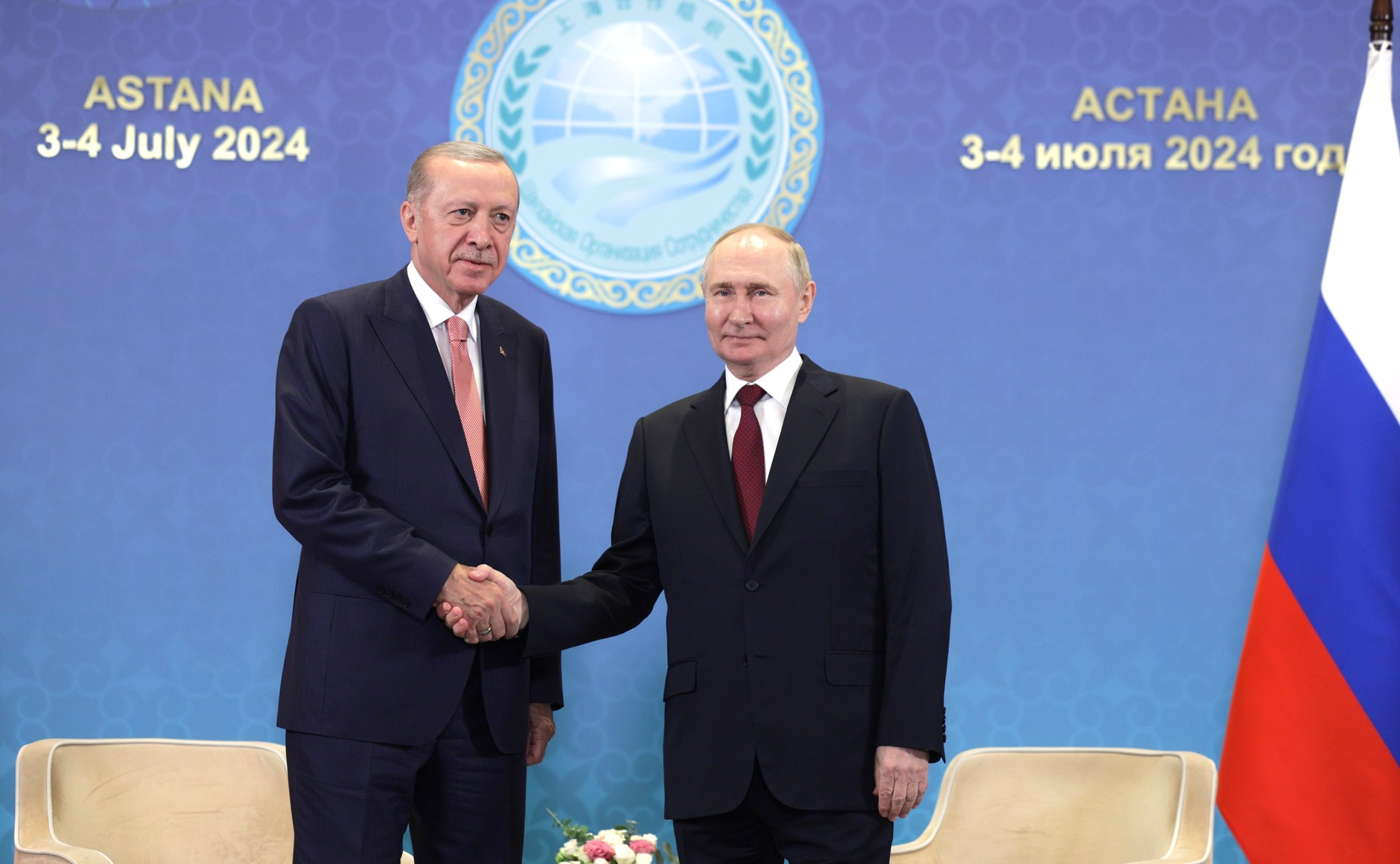
Turkish president Recep Tayyip Erdoğan and Russian president Vladimir Putin on 3 July 2024

In 2022, Turkish president Recep Tayyip Erdoğan said that Turkey could not join sanctions on Russia because of import dependency. Turkey imported almost half of its gas from Russia. Erdoğan and Russian president Vladimir Putin planned for Turkey to become an energy hub for all of Europe. According to Aura Săbăduș, a senior energy journalist focusing on the Black Sea region, "Turkey would accumulate gas from various producers — Russia, Iran and Azerbaijan, [liquefied natural gas] and its own Black Sea gas — and then whitewash it and relabel it as Turkish. European buyers wouldn't know the origin of the gas." For Turkey, the re-sale of Russian gas had been limited as it is practically impossible to re-configure gas flows with the European Union. Furthermore, gas supplies to Turkey are constrained as the TurkStream pipeline was running well below its 31.5 billion cubic meters (bcm) of annual capacity. China, however, has been a more likely candidate for such maneuvers. The PRC overtook Japan as the largest importer of LNG and already practiced such techniques of re-labelling Russian-sourced gas for export.

In March 2023, when the EU adopted new sanctions against Russia, Russian diamond exports to Europe and other nations remained unaffected. While calls from Ukrainian nationals and EU officials to strictly apply sanctions to Russian-sourced diamonds had been referred to the G7, such measures had only experienced weak support from European capitals. In June 2023, EU sanctions against Russian-based diamond exporters were announced, however, their efficacy remained doubtful. Similar to the export routes of other Russian commodities, evading such sanctions through diamond traders in India and other countries that do not impose direct sanction, are very likely.

According to experts, a "refining loophole" allows Russian oil to be transported to refineries in third countries (such as Turkey for example) to be turned into other products like diesel or petrol and re-rexported to Europe.

In July, Ukraine again stated that it would likely not renew the gas transit deal for Gazprom, which delivered natural gas directly to Western Europe across Ukraine. That deal ended in 2024 provided Kyiv about $7 billion per year for 40 billion cubic meters (bpm) of gas. Such a shut-off would forced Central European countries (including Austria, Slovakia, and partly Hungary) to seek gas resource elsewhere. At the same time, Gazprom chief Alexei Miller warned Naftogaz that Russia would do the same as a retribution for seizures of Russian state assets in Ukraine. Russian gas supplies to Europe were expected to drop to 10–16 bcm p.a.

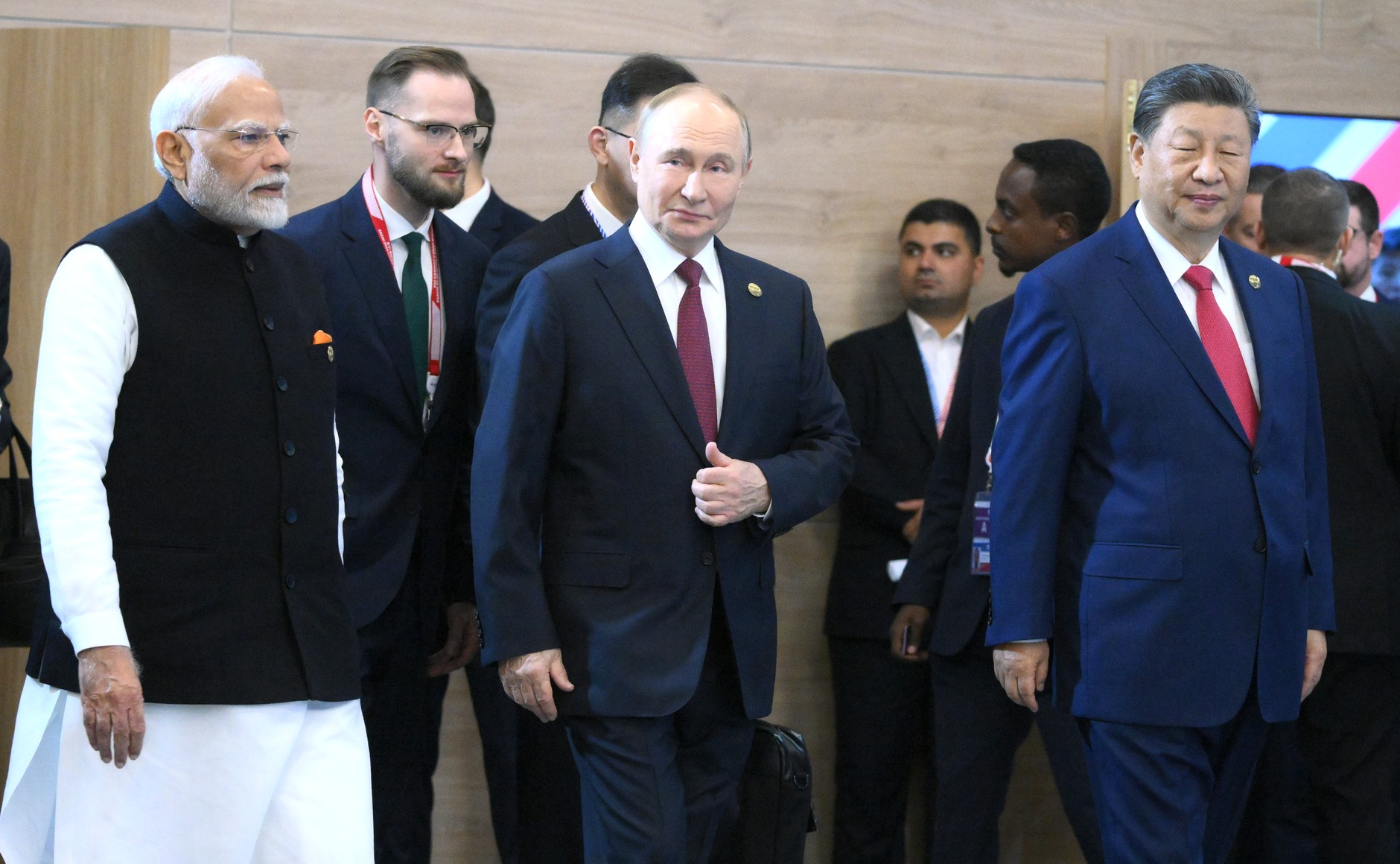
Putin with Indian prime minister Narendra Modi and Chinese president Xi Jinping at the 16th BRICS summit in Kazan, Russia, 23 October 2024

In October, the Treasury Department's Office of Foreign Asset Control (OFAC) sanctioned two shipping companies for violating price cap sanctions on Russian crude exports as the start of a process to sanction crude oil sanction breakers.

In combination with the transition to renewable energy in Europe, European sanctions against Russian coal forced Russia to accelerate the shift of its coal exports to Asia. However, the limited capacity of the Trans-Siberian Railway remained a bottleneck for Russia's eastern reorientation.

In April 2024, the United States and the United Kingdom announced a ban on imports of aluminum, copper and nickel from Russia. Nickel is a critical metal in electric vehicle batteries, and palladium is critical element in catalytic converters, a component in natural gas vehicles. In May 2024, Biden signed legislation banning low-enriched uranium imports from Russia.

In June 2025, a majority of U.S. senators supported the Sanctioning Russia Act, which would impose secondary sanctions against Russia, including 500% tariffs on countries that buy Russian oil, natural gas, uranium, and other exports. China and India are the main consumers of Russian energy.

Donald Trump signing the Sanctioning Russia Act in the Oval Office, 18 September 2026

In July, U.S. president Donald Trump criticized India over its continued oil trade with Russia, despite ongoing Western sanctions. Announcing a 25% "reciprocal tariff" on Indian goods and additional penalties linked to India's purchase of Russian arms and energy, Trump also revealed a proposed trade and energy development agreement with Pakistan. These remarks and policy announcements were seen as a reaction to India's ongoing oil imports from Russia, which Trump suggested were indirectly funding the war in Ukraine. On 14 July 2025, Trump threatened to impose 100% tariffs and secondary sanctions on countries purchasing Russian oil if Russia did not agree to a ceasefire within 50 days.

On 22 October, the United States imposed sanctions on Russian energy companies Rosneft and Lukoil. The U.S. also threatened secondary sanctions against foreign financial institutions and companies that continue to do business with Rosneft and Lukoil, which would affect their customers in China and India.

=== Banking ===
In a 22 February 2022 speech, U.S. president Joe Biden announced restrictions against four Russian banks, including V.E.B., as well as on corrupt billionaires close to Putin. UK prime minister Boris Johnson announced that all major Russian banks would have their assets frozen and be excluded from the UK financial system, and that some export licences to Russia would be suspended. He also introduced a deposit limit for Russian citizens in UK bank accounts, and froze the assets of over 100 additional individuals and entities.

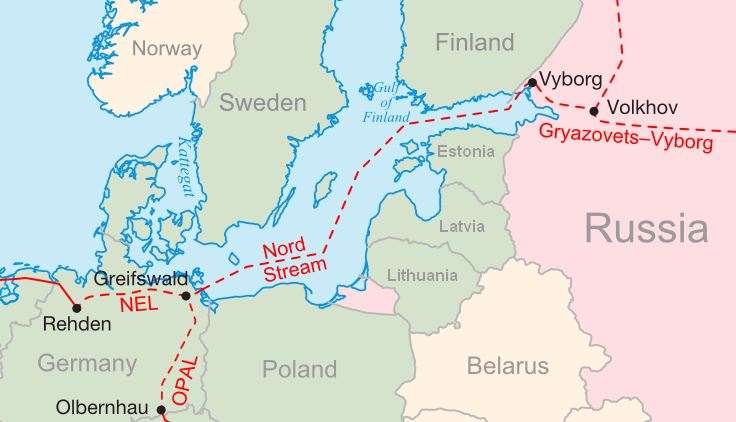
Nord Stream 1, a natural gas pipeline, runs under the Baltic Sea, bypassing Ukraine. Germany imports 50% to 75% of its natural gas from Russia. Nord Stream 2 would have doubled annual capacity of Nord Stream 1 to 110 billion m^{3} (3.9 trillion cu ft).

Days later, and after substantial negotiation between European nations, an agreement was made to expel many Russian banks from the SWIFT international banking network.

On 26 February, two Chinese state banks—the Industrial and Commercial Bank of China, which is the largest bank in the world, and the Bank of China, which is the country's biggest currency trader—were limiting financing to purchase Russian raw materials, which was limiting Russian access to foreign currency. On 28 February, Switzerland froze a number of Russian assets and joined EU sanctions. According to Ignazio Cassis, the president of the Swiss Confederation, the decision was unprecedented but consistent with Swiss neutrality. The same day, Monaco adopted economic sanctions and procedures for freezing funds identical to those taken by most European states. Singapore became the first Southeast Asian country to impose sanctions on Russia by restricting banks and transactions linked to Russia; the move was described by the South China Morning Post as being "almost unprecedented". South Korea announced it would participate in the SWIFT ban against Russia, as well as announcing an export ban on strategic materials covered by the "Big 4" treaties to which Korea belongs—the Nuclear Suppliers Group, the Wassenaar Arrangement, the Australia Group, and the Missile Technology Control Regime; in addition, 57 non-strategic materials, including semiconductors, IT equipment, sensors, lasers, maritime equipment, and aerospace equipment, were planned to be included in the export ban "soon".

On 28 February, Japan announced that its central bank would join sanctions by limiting transactions with Russia's central bank, and would impose sanctions on Belarusian organisations and individuals, including President Aleksandr Lukashenko, because of Belarus' "evident involvement in the invasion" of Ukraine.

Sanctions against Russia already had a significant impact on global banks. Since the invasion in 2022, the value of EU imports from Russia fell by half to about 10 billion euros ($10.85bn) in December 2022. As a result, particularly European banks experienced a serious downturn that could be felt worldwide. As Russia slashed pipeline deliveries to Europe since the invasion, balance books of European financial entities were also affected. As other commodities imported from Russia, were also the target of sanctions, including diamonds, gold, and potash fertilizers, the impact of sanctions was again magnified. Additionally other imports from Russia that are subject to secondary sanctions did already decline before 2023, such as fuel for nuclear plants, before direct measures were implemented. According to the American Bankers Association, sanctions against Russia had increased operational risks for lenders worldwide, and will require additional changes to lower financial risks, according to the source.

Starting in late December 2023, the United States, under a Presidential Order amending Executive Order 14024, may issue secondary sanctions against financial institutions that provide support to Russia's defense industry. These sanctions could apply to banks worldwide and may include measures such as asset freezes or disconnection from the U.S. financial system if they continue offering services to entities linked to Russia's military and industrial sector.

The affected include some of the "children of Russia", Spanish children who were evacuated to the Soviet Union during the Spanish Civil War (1936–1939). Some of them stayed and worked there for decades before returning to Spain and earned pensions that they have not being receiving since December 2024.

=== Russian frozen central bank assets ===
Within days of the Russian invasion of Ukraine in February 2022 western countries moved to freeze Russian central bank funds in these countries. (Note: Technically, this was accomplished not by freezing the assets but by making it illegal to engage in any reserve management transactions with the Russian central bank.) In March 2023 (prior to the destruction of the Kakhovka Dam) a joint assessment was released by the Government of Ukraine, the World Bank, the European Commission, and the United Nations, estimating the total cost of reconstruction and recovery in Ukraine to be US$411 billion (€383 billion). This could eventually exceed $1 trillion (€911 billion), depending on the course of the war. The Kyiv School of Economics has a project and website dedicated to detailing the damages the war has caused to Ukraine. The G7 countries plus the European Union announced in May 2023 that the approximately $300 billion (€275 billion) in Russian central bank assets that had been frozen in these countries would remain frozen "until Russia pays for the damage it has caused to Ukraine," and this was reaffirmed after the G7 meeting in December 2023. This constituted about half of the $612 billion (€560 billion) total foreign currency and gold reserves held at that time by the Russian central bank. By late July 2023, the amount of frozen Russian assets held in these countries was estimated at $335 billion (€300 billion). Most frozen assets, by far, reside in Europe ($217 billion [€201 billion] to $230 billion [€210 billion]), with the United States holding just a small portion ($5 billion [€4.5 billion]) and Japan also holding some. Josep Borrell, EU's foreign affairs chief, said he wants EU countries to confiscate the frozen assets to cover the costs of rebuilding Ukraine after the war. Russian Deputy Foreign Minister Alexander Grushko remarked that Borrell's initiative amounted to "complete lawlessness" and said it would hurt Europe if adopted. Russia has threatened to retaliate by confiscating assets owned by the EU. Austrian Foreign Minister Alexander Schallenberg warned that confiscation of Russian assets that does not have a "watertight" justification would be an "enormous setback, and basically a disgrace" for the EU.

With respect to confiscation of frozen Russian state assets, the difficult problem is how to do it without violating international treaties concerning the protection of cross-border investments, and without violating the principle that laws and regulations cannot be retroactive. Russia's rights also include those under sovereign immunity, which forbids one state from seizing another's property. Various methods have been proposed by experts in international law. A related issue concerns the annual profits from the investment of those assets, estimated to be at least €3 billion (US$3.4 billion). A "windfall profits tax" on those profits is being investigated.

In October 2024 the G7 countries finalized a plan to loan $50 billion (€47.5 billion) to Ukraine, backed by the more than $3 billion (€2.8 billion) in interest that is earned annually by the frozen assets. The United States will contribute $20 billion (€19 billion) of this, with the remainder coming from the European Union, Britain, Canada and Japan.

=== Restrictions on purchase and transfer of goods ===
The EU banned cars with Russian license plates from entering the EU, except for vehicles owned by EU citizens or their immediate family members. The ban on vehicles and some other goods was imposed shortly after the invasion; however, the enforcement was not uniform and some Russian citizens had their cars confiscated after they already were in the EU. The Russian Foreign Ministry claimed that this policy was motivated by "racism pure and simple" against Russians.

=== European impounding of ships ===
A 5 April 2022 article by Insider claims the total cost of yachts impounded throughout Europe to be over $2 billion. This amount includes the motoryacht Tango, seized pursuant to United States sanctions with Spanish assistance.

- France

On 26 February, the French Navy intercepted Russian cargo ship Baltic Leader in the English Channel. The ship was suspected of belonging to a company targeted by the sanctions. The ship was escorted to the port of Boulogne-sur-Mer and was being investigated.

On 2 March, French customs officials seized the yacht Amore Vero at a shipyard in La Ciotat. The Amore Vero is believed to be owned by the sanctioned oligarch Igor Sechin.

Two yachts belonging to Alexei Kuzmichev of Alfa Bank were seized by France on 24 March.

- Germany

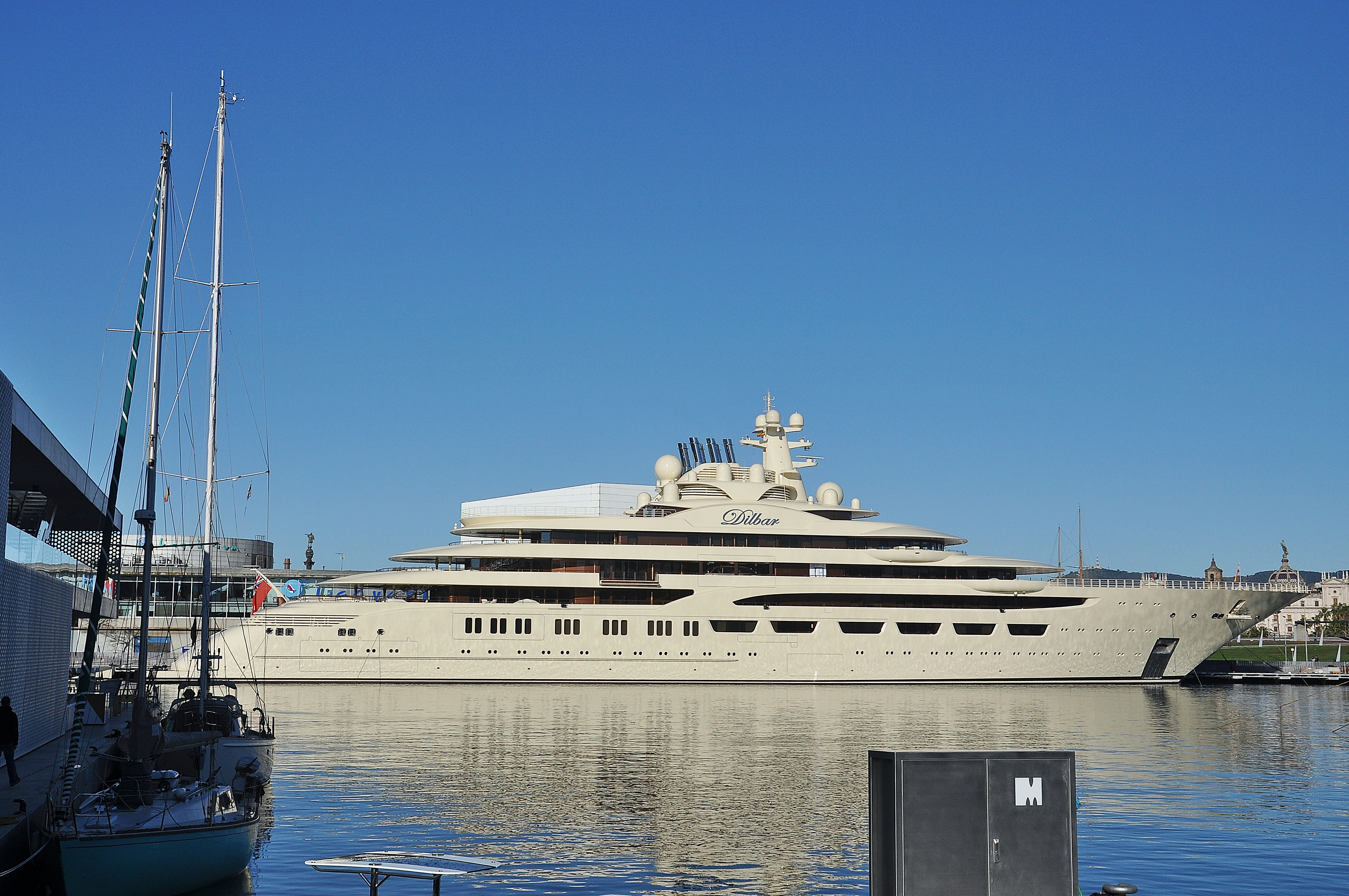
Dilbar-Barcelona 2017

On 2 March, German authorities immobilized the Dilbar, owned by Alisher Usmanov. She is reported to have cost $800 million, employ 84 full-time crew members, and contain the largest indoor swimming pool installed on a superyacht at 180 cubic metres.

- Italy

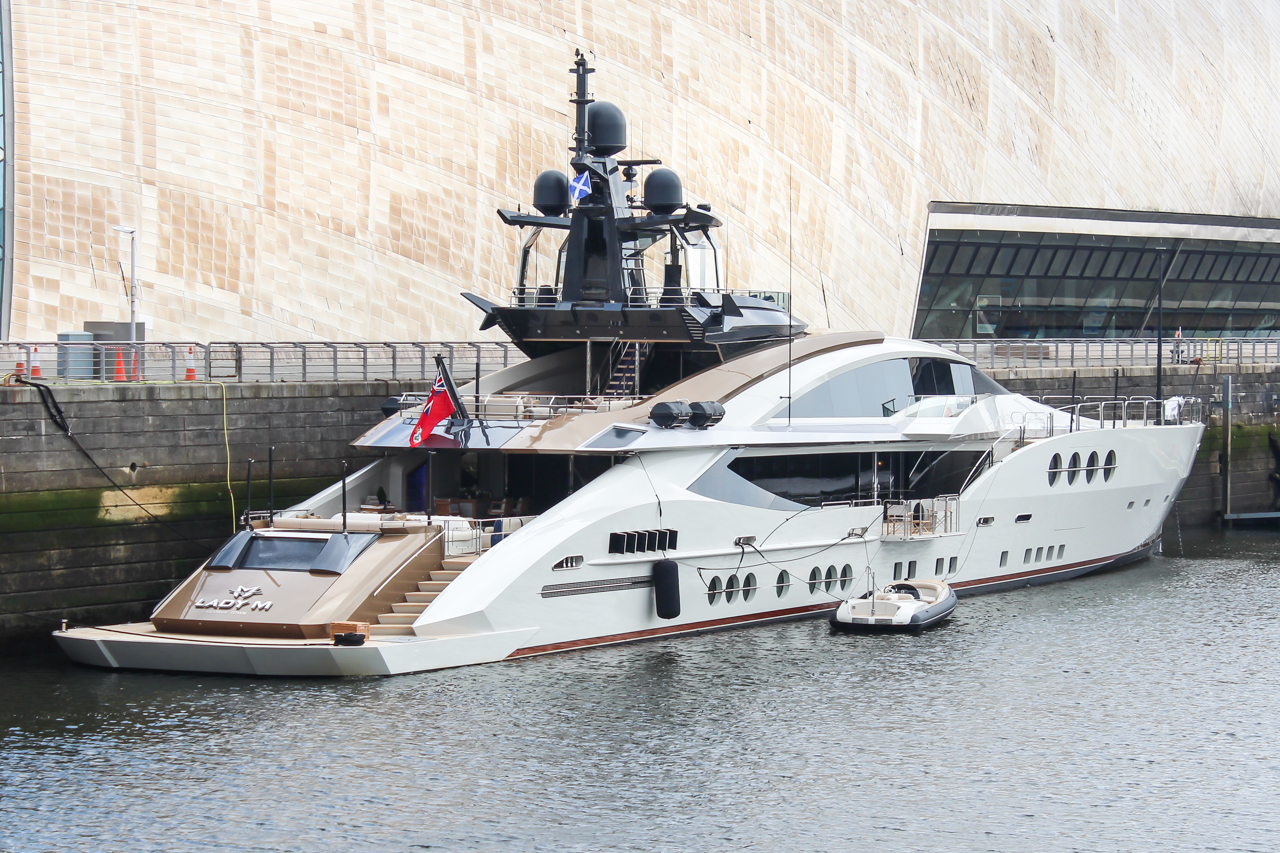
Motor yacht Lady M

On 4 March, Italian police impounded the yacht Lady M. Authorities believe the ship is owned by Alexei Mordashov. The same day, Italian police seized the yacht of Gennady Timchenko, the Lena, in the port city of Sanremo. The yacht was also placed on a United States sanctions list. On 12 March, Italian authorities in the port of Trieste seized the sailing yacht A, known to be owned by Andrey Melnichenko. A spokesperson for Melnichenko vowed to contest the seizure.

- Spain

In March, the Spanish Ministry of Development (known by its acronym "MITMA") detained three yachts pending investigation into whether their true owners are individuals sanctioned by the European Union. The Valerie is detained in the Port of Barcelona; Lady Anastasia in Port Adriano in Calvià, Mallorca; and the Crescent in the Port of Tarragona.

- United Kingdom

On 29 March, Grant Shapps, the British secretary of state for transport, announced the National Crime Agency's seizure of the PHI. The yacht was docked at Canary Wharf and was about to leave.

- Netherlands

On 6 April, Dutch Minister of Foreign Affairs Wopke Hoekstra sent a letter on the subject of sanctions addressed to the House of Representatives. In it, he reported that while no Russian superyachts were at anchor in the Netherlands, twelve yachts under construction across five shipyards were immobilized to ascertain ownership, including possible beneficial ownership.

- Lithuania

On 20 April 2023, Lithuanian parliament Seimas finalised and approved sanctions to all Russian and Belarusian citizens as a response to Russian invasion of Ukraine. From 1 May 2023, citizens of both countries are ineligible to obtain Lithuanian visas, e-resident status or exchange Ukrainian hryvnia. In addition, Russian citizens are also ineligible to submit request for permanent stay in Lithuania or purchase property within Lithuanian territory.

In September 2023, the Dutch shipyard Damen Group has initiated a lawsuit against the government of the Netherlands for losses inflicted by these measures. The cancellation of contracts from Russian clients had significantly impacted the business environment for many shipbuilders. The financial setbacks for that industry stems from the severance of ties with its Russian engineering branch, according to the statement.

=== Aviation ===
The EU sanctions introduced on 25 February 2022 included a ban on the sale of aircraft and spare parts, and also required lessors to terminate the leases on aircraft placed with Russian airlines by the end of March.

==== Services and spare parts ====
On 2 March 2022, Airbus and Boeing both suspended maintenance support for Russian airlines. On 11 March, China blocked the supply of aircraft parts to Russia. Business jet manufacturer Bombardier Aviation announced that, in addition to suspending after-sales service activities, it had cancelled all outstanding orders placed by Russian individuals or companies. As of April, spare part and repair difficulties for the Safran/Saturn SaM146 engines used on the Sukhoi Superjet 100 were expected to force Russian airlines to ground the type. The lack of approved spare parts also affected foreign aircraft flying into Russian airports.

In June, the Russian government advised its airlines to use some aircraft for parts. That same month, Patrick Ky, executive director of the European Aviation Safety Agency (EASA), expressed concern about the safety of Western-made aircraft flying in Russia without proper access to spare parts or maintenance. He highlighted that risks increase over time and cited reports that Russia will be forced to cannibalise aircraft. In August 2022, Reuters reported confirmation from "four industry sources" that Russia had stripped parts from Airbus A320s and A350s, a Boeing 737 and a Sukhoi Superjet in order to perform maintenance on other aircraft. Around 15% of Aeroflot's fleet appeared to be grounded.

In April 2023, Aeroflot started sending its aircraft to Iran for maintenance, benefitting from Iran's experience in performing maintenance under sanctions. In May 2023, it was reported that Aeroflot flight attendants had been instructed not to log maintenance issues that would normally require aircraft to be grounded for repairs. In August 2023, it emerged that the airline was operating some of its fleet with disabled brakes, instead telling pilots to rely solely on reverse thrusters.

In June 2025, researchers from Finland concluded that Russia still managed to import some 4,000 shipments of Boeing and Airbus spare parts, while under sanctions by using subsidiaries in the United Arab Emirates, Turkey, China and Gabon. The investigators calculated the estimated value of the delivered parts to be around €1 billion.

==== Leased aircraft ====
On 10 March 2022, Russia passed legislation outlining conditions to impede the return of leased aircraft to foreign lessors, including the need for approval from a government committee and payment of settlements in Roubles.

Many aircraft operated by Russian airlines had been registered with the Bermuda registry, which suspended airworthiness approvals on 14 March. The same day, Russia implemented a law allowing aircraft operated by Russian airlines to be re-registered with the Russian registry, effectively confiscating them from their overseas owners. Some 515 commercial aircraft, valued at approximately $10 billion, were leased by Russian airlines from foreign lessors prior to the sanctions. Lessors moved swiftly to repossess those few aircraft "stranded" outside Russia and reassigned some new aircraft due to be placed with Russian airlines, particularly Boeing 737 MAX that are now unlikely to be recertified by Russia.

By 22 March 78 foreign-owned aircraft had been reclaimed, amid speculation that some Russian airlines were cooperating with lessors in order to avoid jeopardising future relations. Rossiya Airlines, a subsidiary of Aeroflot, had reregistered all its fleet with the Russian registry by 29 March.

By 30 March, Irish lessor AerCap had repossessed 22 of the 135 aircraft it had leased to Russian airlines, and three of the 14 engines on lease. It filed insurance claims totalling $3.5 billion for the remaining aircraft, many of which were "now being flown illegally by [its] former airline customers". Singapore-based lessor BOC Aviation had 18 aircraft worth $935 million on lease to Russian companies; it repossessed from Hong Kong one Boeing 747-8F leased to AirBridgeCargo but two other freighters were flown back to Russia contrary to explicit instructions, despite their insurance coverage and airworthiness certificates having been revoked.

On 31 March, Russian deputy prime minister Yury Borisov declared that all leased aircraft still in Russia had been re-registered and would remain in Russia, a total of over 400 aircraft. However, re-registration of aircraft without their owners' consent is a breach of ICAO standards. These aircraft may be confiscated and repossessed upon landing in any airport outside of Russia.

Aeroflot gradually resumed international flights to "friendly" countries: to Kyrgyzstan from 14 March, Azerbaijan on 21 March, Armenia from 22 March, Iran from 2 April, Sri Lanka from 8 April, and Turkey and India from 6 May. On 2 June, an Aeroflot A330 belonging to an Irish lessor was temporarily impounded by a commercial court in Sri Lanka, though the aircraft was subsequently allowed to return to Russia on 5 June.

On 13 May, Aeroflot announced that it had purchased 8 A330s from foreign leasing companies, under an exemption that allows the execution of a lease solely to obtain repayments. On 1 June, it emerged that five Russian airlines had kept a total of 31 aircraft outside Russia and returned them to lessors. Other airlines including Aeroflot have deposited money in special Rouble accounts to enable lessors to claim the amounts once sanctions are lifted. In August, S7 Airlines was given special permission to "export" its two 737 MAX aircraft to Turkey in order to return them to their lessor.

==== Airspace ====
Russia Ukraine – closed its airspace to Russia in 2015 Countries that have banned Russian aircraft from their airspace in response to the invasion

On 24 February 2022, Ukrainian airspace was closed to civilian aircraft a few hours before the Russian invasion started, on the basis of a notification from the Russian Ministry of Defence. The European regulator EASA issued a Conflict Zone Information Bulletin (CZIB) warning that civilian aircraft could be misidentified or even directly targeted.

On 25 February, the UK announced the closure of its airspace to Russian airlines. On 27 February, the EU and Canada closed their airspace to all Russian aircraft, including both commercial and private aircraft. Russia issued a reciprocal ban, forcing many airlines to reroute or cancel flights to Asian destinations. The U.S. issued a similar ban on 1 March. On 8 March, Aeroflot suspended all its remaining flights to international destinations (except for Minsk, Belarus) due to airspace restrictions and to counter the "risk" of aircraft being repossessed by lessors. On 9 March, to avoid Russian airspace, Finnair started routing its flights to Asia over the North Pole, the first time a polar route has been used for commercial flights in nearly 30 years. An analysis of routes between Europe and Asia showed increased travel distances of between 1,200 and 4,000 km; the frequency of flights to some destinations has been reduced and other routes have been dropped.

By 29 March 2022, the following countries and territories had completely closed their airspace to all Russian airlines and Russian-registered private jets:

- Albania
- Anguilla
- Aruba
- Bermuda
- Bonaire
- British Virgin Islands
- Canada
- Cayman Islands
- Faroe Islands
- Gibraltar
- Greenland
- Iceland
- Kosovo
- Moldova
- Montenegro
- Montserrat
- North Macedonia
- Norway
- Saba
- Saint Helena
- Sint Eustatius
- Sint Maarten
- Switzerland (with exceptions for diplomats and United Nations representatives)
- Turks and Caicos Islands
- Ukraine (since 2015)
- United Kingdom
- United States

European Union (EU27)

- Austria
- Belgium
- Bulgaria
- Croatia
- Cyprus
- Czech Republic
- Denmark
- Estonia
- Finland
- France
- Germany
- Greece
- Hungary
- Ireland
- Italy
- Latvia
- Lithuania
- Luxembourg
- Malta
- Netherlands
- Poland
- Portugal
- Romania
- Slovakia
- Slovenia
- Spain
- Sweden

In addition to airspace closure under sanctions, on 11 April EASA blacklisted 21 Russian airlines on safety grounds, given that aircraft are being operated without airworthiness certificates, in breach of the Chicago Convention and international safety standards. EASA clarified that the Russian air transport regulator, Rosaviatsia, had failed to provide evidence that it has the capacity to perform the oversight activities required to ensure air safety. The U.S. Federal Aviation Administration also downgraded Russia's safety rating, meaning that no new services to the U.S. and no codeshares with US carriers are authorised.

In May 2022, the UK announced that Russian airlines would be prohibited from selling their landing slots at UK airports, valued at approximately £50 million. The slots were subsequently reallocated to other airlines.

At the end of May, the Civil Aviation Administration of China (CAAC) closed its airspace to aircraft that have been re-registered with the Russian registry in breach of ICAO regulations and for which the airlines are thus unable to provide proper documentation.

==== Russian aircraft manufacturing industry ====
EASA revoked the type certificates of the Sukhoi Superjet 100, Tupolev Tu-204 and four other Russian aircraft types on 14 March, as well as approvals of maintenance organisations and third-country authorisations for Russian airlines. EASA also suspended all work on new certification applications, including the Irkut MC-21 airliner. Due to the need to source all aircraft components domestically, notably the Pratt & Whitney PW1400G engines which will be replaced by Russian-built Aviadvigatel PD-14 units, production of the MC-21 is expected to be delayed by two years. In the meantime, production of older and less fuel-efficient Russian-built aircraft such as the Tupolev Tu-214 and Ilyushin Il-96-400 will be stepped up, and a fuel subsidy introduced. The Sino-Russian CR929 wide-body aircraft programme, which was already in difficulty due to the diverging expectations of the two parties, is also expected to suffer significant delays or even cancellation.

On 29 June, the U.S. government expanded its sanctions to cover United Aircraft Corporation (UAC) (the parent company of Irkut, United Engine, Tupolev, Ilyushin and others), with an exemption allowing UAC to export parts and services for civil aircraft not registered in Russia if necessary for aviation safety.

==== Aviation industry organisations and alliances ====
On 15 March, Aeroflot CEO Mikhail Poluboyarinov, who is targeted with EU sanctions, was removed from the IATA board of governors.

In April, the two Russian airlines that were members of global airline alliances both saw their memberships suspended: S7 Airlines from Oneworld and Aeroflot from SkyTeam.

=== U.S. "freeze and seize" policy ===
The main United States sanctions law, IEEPA, blocks the designated person or entity's assets, and also prohibits any United States person from transacting business with the designated person or entity. Specifically, 50 U.S.C. § 1705 criminalizes activities that "violate, attempt to violate, conspire to violate, or cause a violation of any license, order, regulation, or prohibition", and allows for fines up to $1 million, imprisonment up to 20 years, or both. Additionally, United States asset forfeiture laws allow for the seizure of assets considered to be the proceeds of criminal activity.

On 3 February 2022, John "Jack" Hanick was arrested in London for violating the sanctions against Konstantin Malofeev, owner of Tsargrad TV. Malofeev is targeted with sanctions by the European Union and United States for material and financial support to Donbas separatists. (Note: Through Malofeev, Hanick is close to the pro Russia former Greek defense minister Panos Kammenos and Vladimir Putin gives carte blanche to Tsargrad TV which according to Malofeev is the Russian equivalent to Fox News.) Hanick was the first person criminally indicted for violating United States sanctions during the War in Ukraine.

According to court records, Hanick has been under sealed indictment in the United States District Court for the Southern District of New York since November 2021. The indictment was unsealed 3 March 2022. Hanick awaits extradition from the United Kingdom to the United States.

Footage from 4 April 2022 seizure of the Motoryacht Tango in Palma de Mallorca from a warrant executed by Guardia Civil, Homeland Security Investigations and Federal Bureau of Investigation

United States Attorney General Merrick B. Garland announces the seizure of the Motoryacht Tango on 4 April 2022.

In the 1 March State of the Union Address, American President Joe Biden announced an effort to target the wealth of Russian oligarchs.

Tonight, I say to the Russian oligarchs and the corrupt leaders who've bilked billions of dollars off this violent regime: No more.

The United States – I mean it. The United States Department of Justice is assembling a dedicated task force to go after the crimes of the Russian oligarchs.

We're joining with European Allies to find and seize their yachts, their luxury apartments, their private jets. We're coming for your ill-begotten gains.

On 2 March, U.S. Attorney General Merrick B. Garland announced the formation of Task Force KleptoCapture, an inter-agency effort.

On 11 March, United States President Joseph R. Biden signed Executive Order 14068, "Prohibiting Certain Imports, Exports, and New Investment With Respect to Continued Russian Federation Aggression," an order of economic sanctions under the United States International Emergency Economic Powers Act against several oligarchs. The order targeted two properties of Viktor Vekselberg worth an estimated $180 million: an Airbus A319-115 jet and the motoryacht Tango. Estimates of the value of the Tango range from $90 million (U.S. Department of Justice estimate) to $120 million (from the website Superyachtfan.com).

On 4 April, the yacht was seized by Civil Guard of Spain and U.S. federal agents in Mallorca. A United States Department of Justice press release states that the seizure of the Tango was by request of Task Force KleptoCapture, an interagency task force operated through the U.S. Deputy Attorney General.

The matter is pending in the United States District Court for the District of Columbia. The affidavit for the seizure warrant states that the yacht is seized on probable cause to suspect violations of 18 U.S.C. § 1349 (conspiracy to commit bank fraud), 50 U.S.C. § 1705 (International Emergency Economic Powers Act), and 18 U.S.C. § 1956 (money laundering), and as authorized by American statutes on civil and criminal asset forfeiture.

The increased U.S. sanctions against Russia, aimed at the companies and individuals based in Turkey, China and the UAE for supplying the military purposes goods to Moscow. On 2 November 2023, the U.S. Treasury Department said new sanctions include more restrictions on Russia energy and mining industry. The U.S. sanctioned the UAE's ARX Financial Engineering and four of its employees for assisting transfer of Russian assets to the Emirates and for providing alternatives to sanctioned-hit Russian bank VTB in converting roubles into US dollars.

=== Defense sector ===
Following the 2022 invasion, sanctions were imposed on various entities in the Arms industry of Russia, which supply the Russian Armed Forces with equipment as well as sanctions on financial entities which support the arms industry. The sanctions in the defense industry includes not only entities which provide pure military equipment but also dual-use products such as electronics, high-computing and avionics, machine-building and other products which can be used for military purposes. On 22 December 2023, President Biden expanded the prerogatives of the Treasury to sanction financial entities which help the Russian arms industry.

=== Science ===
Shortly after the invasion, the European Commission, followed by the United States, decided to suspend cooperation with Russian entities in research, science and innovation. With the adoption of the fifth package of sanctions against Russia on 8 April 2022, the participations of all Russian public bodies or public-related entities in ongoing Horizon Europe projects were terminated, though the science community remains divided over the justification for science sanctions. Russian scientists are impacted by the sanctions—irrespective of the individual scientists' attitudes towards the war. Among other effects, the sanctions hinder scientific cooperation in the Arctic. More generally, the sanctions have had stark effects on Russian participation in global scientific exchange and collaboration, a concern pointed out by the International Union of Pure and Applied Physics and researchers in international particle physics community in particular.

=== Other entities ===
On 9 March 2022, the New Zealand Parliament passed the Russia Sanctions Act 2022, which allows for sanctions to be placed on individuals connected to the 2022 Russian invasion of Ukraine and targets their assets including funds, ships, and planes. New Zealand also created a blacklist targeting senior Russian officials and oligarchs. On 6 April, New Zealand also imposed a 35% tariff on Russian products while restricting industrial exports to Russia.

The Bahamas, Antigua and Barbuda and Saint Kitts and Nevis also joined the list of imposing sanctions on Russia.

On 2 May 2022, Finnish consortium Fennovoima announced that it had terminated its contract with Russia's state-owned nuclear power supplier Rosatom for the delivery of a planned nuclear power plant in Finland.

== Shifting of safe havens and sanctions evasion ==
=== Andorra ===
On 24 March 2022, sanctions imposed by Andorra on banking transactions carried out by individuals and legal entities from Russia and Belarus came into force. In total, 1,150 were blocked, the purchase, sale and negotiation of certain financial issues were prohibited, as well as Andorran nationals from borrowing from the central banks and public entities of these two countries; trade with Russia and Belarus was prohibited with public funds, and Russian nations were prohibited from making new deposits in Andorra for values greater than €100,000. In general, Andorra aligned itself with the sanctions imposed by the European Union. The Andorran government extended the list of persons sanctioned by decree on 4 May 2022.

=== China ===
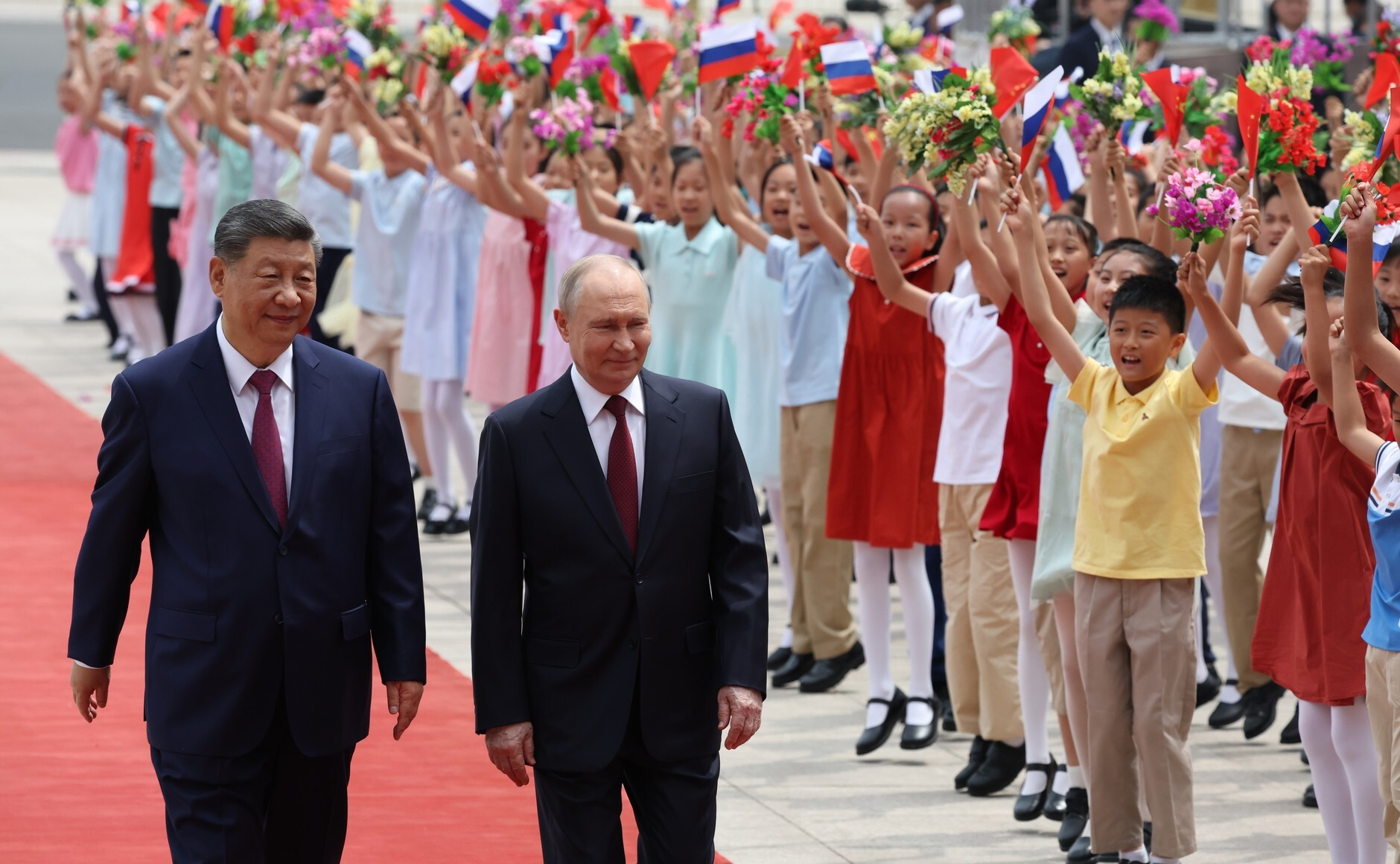
Vladimir Putin and Xi Jinping during a state visit in Beijing, May 2026

In January 2023, Bloomberg News reported that the U.S. government confronted the Chinese about their state-owned enterprises providing non-lethal assistance to Russia. In February 2023, The Wall Street Journal reported that according to Russian customs data, Chinese companies have shipped dual-use items such as navigation equipment, jamming technology, and fighter jet parts to Russian state-owned companies. The New York Times reported that Poly Technologies sent sufficient quantities of gunpower to the Barnaul Cartridge Plant to make 80 million rounds of ammunition. China is a key supplier of nitrocellulose, a key ingredient for modern gunpowder, to Russia.

In March 2023, Politico reported that between June and December 2022, Chinese companies such as the state-owned Norinco shipped dual-use items, including assault rifles, drone parts, and body armor, to Russian companies, which have also been routing shipments via Middle Eastern countries that have relationships with both Russia and the West. In May 2023, the European Union discussed placing sanctions on companies from China and five other countries for selling equipment that could be used in weapons by Russia.

In 2023, Izhevsk Electromechanical Plant (IEMZ Kupol) began manufacturing kamikaze drones for the Russian military using Chinese engines and parts. Chinese technical advisers have also assisted IEMZ Kupol. Sources told Reuters that Kupol established a factory in China and delivered seven complete Garpiya-3 drones in early 2024. Chinese companies have been reported to supply the Alabuga Special Economic Zone for military drone production.

In April 2024, the United States and the United Kingdom announced a ban on imports of Russian aluminum, copper, and nickel. Due to sanctions, Russian nickel, copper and palladium mining and smelting company Norilsk Nickel planned to move some of its copper smelting to China and establish a joint venture with a Chinese company. Finished copper products would be sold as Chinese products to avoid Western sanctions. Nickel is a critical metal in electric vehicle batteries, and palladium is critical element in catalytic converters, a component in natural gas vehicles.

Remains of a Russian drone in Rivne Oblast. China has been accused of covertly helping Russia build drones used to strike Ukraine.

In September 2024, the United States Deputy Secretary of State Kurt Campbell said that China is aiding the Russian military, referring to materials given to Russia by China as ″being applied directly to the Russian war machine″. Campbell said that both governments were putting in efforts at the ″highest levels″ to hide and protect their collaboration, and that in exchange for their assistance, Russia was sharing sensitive military technologies with China.

In April 2026, the EU's 20th sanctions package against Russia included Chinese entities it accused of providing dual-use goods and weapons systems to Russia's military-industrial complex. In mid-2025, China's exports of key drone components to Russia sharply increased. In September 2026, an investigation by The Telegraph and Politico uncovered internal Russian documents showing a Chinese state-owned firm supplying Russia with materials used to build drones which Russia uses to attack Ukraine. According to experts, the scale of the disguised shipments and military importance of the destination suggested that Chinese officials were aware of the transfers.

=== Switzerland ===
Switzerland follows the EU sanctions and in response was put on the list of "unfriendly nations" by Russia. According to the Swiss Embassy in Moscow, Switzerland has long been "the most important destination worldwide for rich Russians to manage their wealth". The Bank for International Settlements estimates that Russian nationals have only $11 billion deposited in Swiss bank accounts, though other estimates are much higher: for example the Neue Zürcher Zeitung estimates the amount deposited to be CHF 150 billion and the Swiss Bankers Association states even between CHF 150 and 200 billion (between US$160 and 214 billion). As of July 2022, CHF 6.7 billion had been frozen by the Swiss authorities, according to Swiss authorities more than any other country has. The sanctions target at least 1156 people and 98 companies which were identified by the EU.

Leading Russian opposition figures, including British financier Bill Browder, have criticised Switzerland by saying the country is not doing nearly enough, while granting Russia too many loopholes in commodities trading, real estate investing or banking sector. According to U.S. Ambassador to Switzerland Scott Miller in 2023, "Switzerland could block an additional CHF 50–100 billion" of the Russian assets.

In May 2022, the Helsinki Commission of the U.S. Congress accused Switzerland to be "a leading enabler of Russian dictator Vladimir Putin and his cronies"—a claim that was strongly rejected by the Swiss government stating that "the country implements all sanctions that were decided by the EU and the Federal Council". The Federal Council of Switzerland called the allegations of the Helsinki Commission "politically unacceptable" and the President of the Swiss Confederation complained in a phone call with the U.S. secretary of state Antony Blinken about the accusations. Switzerland hosted an international conference in Lugano on 5 July 2022 to finance the rebuilding of war-torn Ukraine. In August 2022, Switzerland adopted new EU sanctions to ban all Russian gold imports. At the same time, new exemptions with respect to financial transactions related to agricultural products and oil supplies to third countries were also made public. In September, Switzerland stopped sharing tax information with Russia; Russia therefore no longer receives information about financial accounts Russian citizens have in Switzerland. According to Swiss NGO Public Eye in 2023: "The war in Ukraine has put a spotlight on all the Swiss shortcomings in the fight against corruption, money laundering, and the implementation of sanctions".

On 24 July 2023, a meeting between the U.S. Treasury and the State Secretariat for Economic Affairs (SECO) was held in Geneva, Switzerland to further pressure Swiss commodity traders to reduce their exposure to Russian-based energy imports to Europe. The U.S. embassy in Bern was also present. A number of issues were discussed, including the impact of sanctions against Russia on the global energy market and food security. Swiss interests were represented by Suissenégoce, composed of trading companies, transporters, banks, insurance companies and specialist service providers. Swiss companies had been seriously affected by the war in Ukraine, and resulting economic sanctions. By the end of July 2023, as a result of additional sanctions imposed by the EU, Ukraine and the U.S., crude oil prices were again rising by as much as 8%, and concurrently the price for discounted Russian Urals crude was also increasing. Despite the sanctions, particularly Urals crude was trading again above US$60 per barrel. Against the backdrop of these new developments, U.S. and EU interests to sanction Russian oil exports were at the center of these critical talks in Geneva, but without accusing Swiss commodity traders to have directly evaded economic sanctions.

The top four traders, Vitol, Cargill, Glencore and Trafigura, made a combined $50 billion in profits in 2022, five times more than in the previous decade, also because traders were producing additional profits from buying cheaper and sanctioned oil cargoes and selling them at a hefty profit. Henceforth, the main concern for the U.S. and European allies is that adherence to sanctions is a matter of self-verification without any independent or directed supervision. The talks in Switzerland between external U.S. interests and representatives from Swiss companies were described as "useful for all parties". The U.S. Department of the Treasury is conducting such meetings not only in Switzerland but in a number of other European countries to discuss the technical aspects of sanctions imposed on the Russia energy economy.

On 27 September 2023, shares of the Swiss bank UBS were under considerable pressure and the Swiss Stock Exchange had to temporarily halt trading activities as the stock price retreated by as much as 8%. Bloomberg reported that the U.S. Department of Justice (DOJ) had started an investigation into the dealings of Credit Suisse with Russia before Switzerland's second ranking bank was acquired by UBS in June 2023. Share values of UBS increased considerably in late summer of 2023 before the DOJ probe again brought uncertainty to the largest Swiss bank. The DOJ had suspected that Credit Suisse, traditionally a substantial holder of Russian assets, had violated economic sanctions before it was acquired by UBS. Switzerland complied with all E.U. financial sanctions against Russia in 2022 and 2023, but the recent probe was not included in the latest quarterly report by UBS, and is a result of previous dealings by CS with sanctioned Russian entities. Since the take-over of Credit Suisse, UBS has built up a large buffer of 9 billion CHF (US$10.3 billion) to cover potential losses of Credit Suisse assets.

=== United Arab Emirates ===
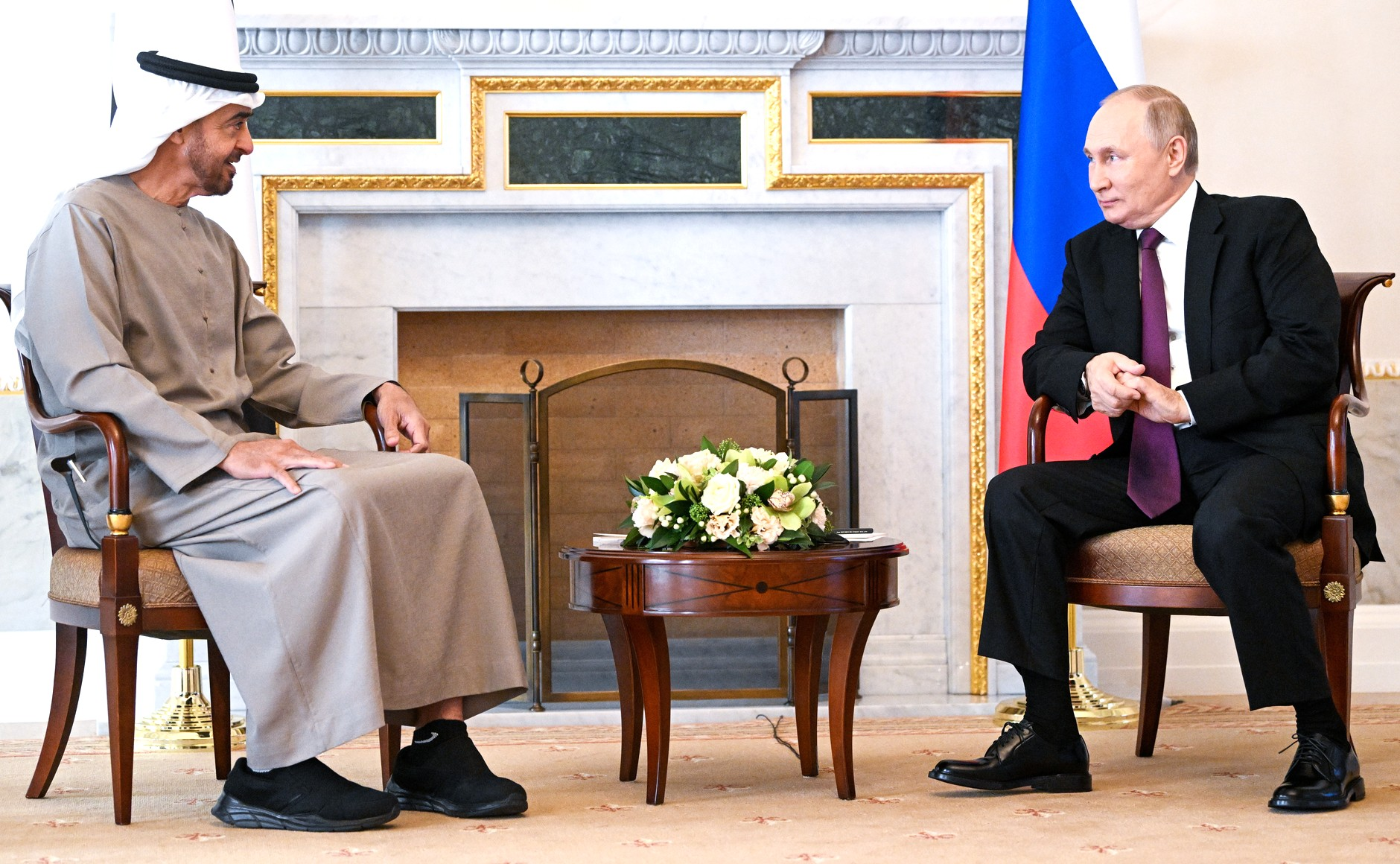
UAE's President Mohamed bin Zayed Al Nahyan with Russian president Vladimir Putin, days after OPEC+ cut oil production, 11 October 2022

Lured by the United Arab Emirates' flexible visa program, many wealthy Russians moved their money to the UAE. Property purchases in Dubai by Russians surged by 67% in the first three months of 2022. Around 200,000 Russians were estimated to have left the country in the first 10 days of the war. Investigations revealed that private jets and yachts belonging to sanctioned Russian oligarchs and billionaires were found in places like Dubai and the Maldives. A number of private jets belonging to sanctioned Russians were also tracked flying back and forth between Moscow and Tel Aviv, and between Russia and Dubai. Some Russians also began to utilize the UAE's "golden visa" program, which could allow these oligarchs to live, work, and study in the UAE with full ownership of their business.

In May 2022, European Parliament members suggested that the UAE should be blacklisted for allowing sanctioned Russian oligarchs and other officials to invest in properties and businesses in Dubai.

A Russian oligarch, Andrey Melnichenko was sanctioned by the European Union (EU) in March 2022, after claims that he attended a meeting with Putin on the day of the invasion. Following the sanctions, Italian authorities seized Melnichenko's $600 million Sailing Yacht A. Another yacht belonging to him, the $300 million Motor Yacht A was identified parked in a port in Ras al-Khaimah in the UAE. A $350 million Boeing 787 Dreamliner private jet belonging to Roman Abramovich was also grounded in Dubai. The U.S. Department of Justice has an order from a U.S. federal judge to seize the jet. Politicians and campaigners, including Danish MEP Kira Marie Peter-Hansen and campaigner Bill Browder, called for the UAE to be blacklisted for allowing the flow of "dirty money" and acting as a refuge for sanctioned Russians.

On 23 June, the Madame Gu superyacht, owned by sanctioned billionaire Andrey Skoch, was reported to have been docked at Port Rashid in Dubai since 25 March. It was designated as sanctioned property by the U.S. In June 2022, Russia's wealthiest oligarch, Vladimir Potanin moved his $300 million superyacht, Nirvana, to Dubai. Potanin was not sanctioned at the time, and the move to shift the luxury superyacht to Dubai's Port Rashid was a precautionary measure.

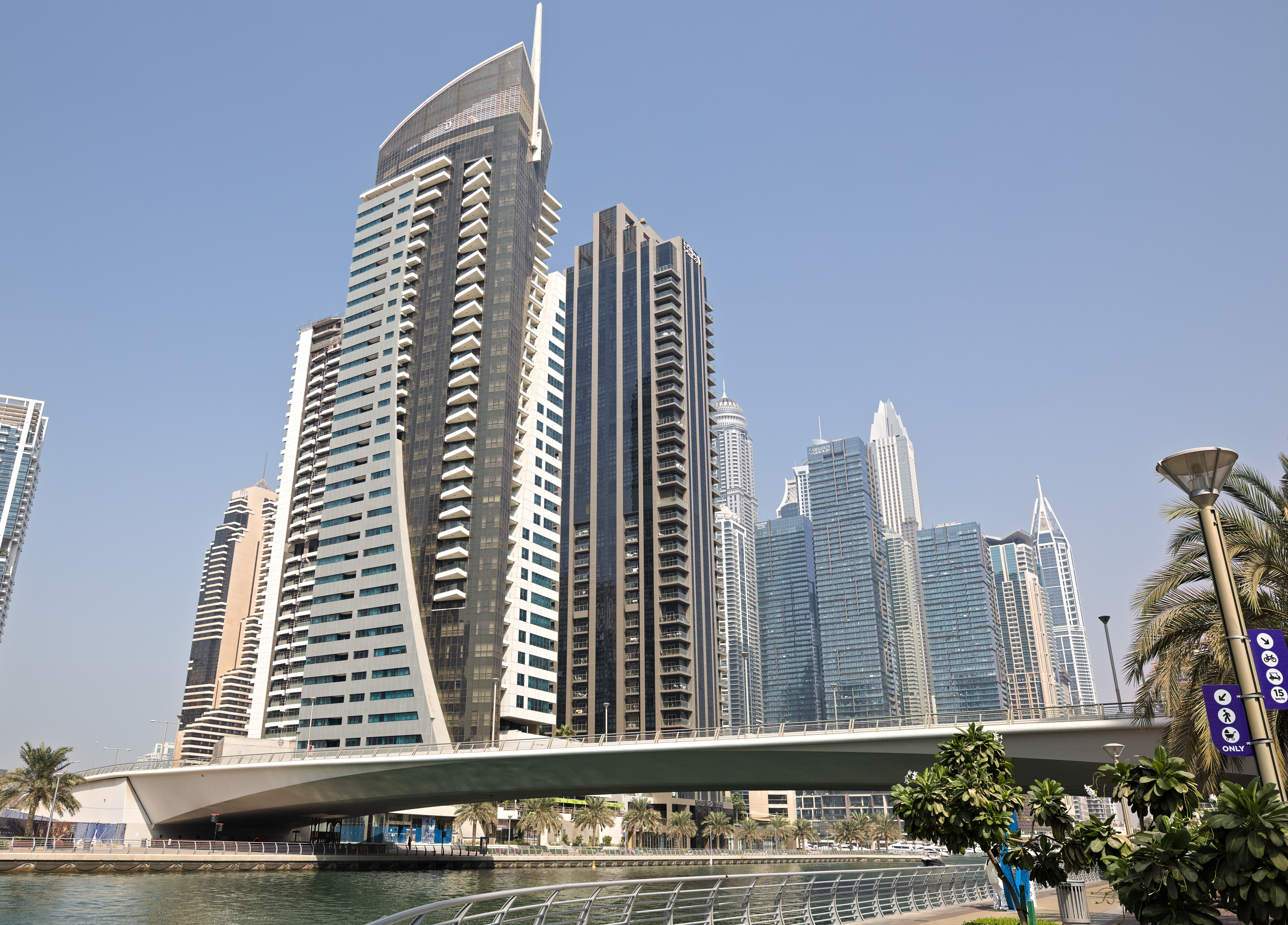
Russian commodities traders relocated from Switzerland to Dubai.

The United Arab Emirates defends its stance on sanctions targeting Russian individuals by stating that it remains neutral and has not imposed sanctions. The UAE stated that its state policy complies with the international rights norms, stipulated by the United Nations Organization, which has not imposed any sanctions.

On 15 March 2023, the EU and Joe Biden officials shared a concern that Russia continued to access confidential foreign chips and technology through countries like the UAE, China, Iran, Turkey and Kazakhstan, which were acting as intermediaries. The UAE and China, which did not have any sanctions on Russia, were also helping Russia to access the U.S. technology and equipment. From Italy, the U.S. also wanted to extradite a Russian national, Artem Uss (son of Aleksandr Uss), who was one of the major supply chain mediators supplying American technology to Russia. But Artem Uss escaped from his house arrest in Milan mid April and clandestinely returned to Russia.

By April, the shifting to safe havens was also involving large gold sales that are now conducted through the UAE first, before reaching other destinations. Due to the flexibility of gold transactions, and the ability to re-issue gold certificates as well as gold bullions, it is practically impossible to control the flow of gold from sanctioned entities. Even when gold-rich countries, such as Switzerland had adhered to EU sanctions, and no longer imported gold directly from Russia, the trade with such commodities among others, actually increased for 2022 and early 2023. Furthermore, both China and Russia had increased their gold reserves considerably, even before the onset of the hostilities between Russia and Ukraine, driving up the gold price. As the gold trade became less transparent due to the sanctions imposed on Russia, economic effects of such transactions are now much more difficult to predict.

In May, the EU identified that Chinese and the UAE firms could supply weapon components to Russia. The EU banned export of dual-use goods targeting 8 Chinese firms. The sanctions targeted two UAE-based companies, I Jet Global and Success Aviation Services. The EU said that "third countries whose jurisdiction is demonstrated to be at continued and particularly high risk of being used for circumvention for the benefit of Russia" will face total ban on imports from EU military and high tech kit, which could include China and UAE, if they continued arming Russia. Both China and the UAE had refuted such claims, even though the UAE had given financial support to the Russian Federation during the course of the war. Later, US treasury officials concluded that the military support from China to the RF through the UAE had not been substantial.

On 27 June, the U.S. imposed sanctions on four firms connected with Russia's Wagner Group. The companies, including Dubai-based Industrial Resources General Trading, were alleged of illicit trade of gold deals to fund the Wagner Group. The Treasury's Office of Foreign Assets Control also targeted two firms in Central African Republic and one in Russia. Dubai's Industrial Resources General Trading was sanctioned for assisting one of the sanctioned African company, Diamville.

The UAE president Mohammed bin Zayed had the meeting with the EU official Ursula von der Leyen on 7 September, in Abu Dhabi. The EU official emphasized on the UAE to stop allowing Russia to evade the EU sanctions for Ukraine invasion. She demanded more cooperation from the Emirati leader in addressing the issue.

Luxury brands like Cartier and Tiffany announced that they were not purchasing Russian diamonds. However, the diamond companies in Russia were evading the sanctions and selling to the West through intermediaries in third countries, primarily Dubai. It was revealed that the Russian rough diamonds were being mixed in parcels in Dubai to hide their origin. Some diamond experts called Dubai the "laundromat" for the diamond industry. Then, the rough diamonds are send to polishers in other countries as "mixed" goods, thus preventing the diamonds from being considered as "Russian".

On 8 November, the UK Foreign Ministry targeted 29 individuals and entities operating across Russia's gold, oil and strategic sectors, which included a Dubai-based gold trader Paloma Precious DMCC and the Zimbabwean businessman Howard Jon Baker. The UAE-based network was accused of funneling $300 million in gold profits to Russia and supporting its war against Ukraine. The UAE became the biggest hub for Russian gold since war started. Baker had connections with the beneficial owner of one of the Emirates' biggest gold refiners, which lost recognition due to involvement in money laundering.

=== India ===
Russian President Vladimir Putin, Indian Prime Minister Narendra Modi and Chinese President Xi Jinping at the 18th BRICS summit in New Delhi, India, 12 September 2026

Russia imports sensitive electronics, machinery, auto parts, and defence equipment from India. Trade, including oil sales, has surged since 2022, boosting revenue for Russian state-owned companies. To bypass sanctions and manage its currency surplus, Russia pays in rupees, supporting both civilian and military needs. Reuters reported in July 2025 that according to Indian customs data, an Indian company shipped military-use explosive compounds valued at $1.4 million to Russia in December 2024.

=== United Kingdom ===
As of May 2023, 127 British companies admitted to have breached economic sanctions against the Russian economy. HM Treasury revealed such information in November 2023, when these companies voluntarily disclosed detailed information on sanction evasion to avoid or reduce government penalties. In total 1,600 individuals and companies were placed under sanctions since Russia's invasion of the Ukraine, including more than two dozen banks and 100 oligarchs, revealing the large scale economic connections between the UK and the Russian Federation. In late 2023, Great Britain expanded its sanction policies to include an additional 29 individuals and two gold traders, Nord Gold Plc and Highland Gold Mining Ltd. UAE networks were also targeted, which generated more than $300 million in gold revenues for Russia, as well as the energy trading firm Paramount Energy & Commodities DMCC based in Geneva. These measures are continuously enforced by Britain's National Crime Agency (NCA).

=== United States of America ===
According to reports surfacing in July 2023, American oilfield service providers (including SLB, formerly Schlumberger) have provided Russia with hardware worth more than $200 million in 2022/23. The data was based on customs data obtained by B4Ukraine and compiled by the Associated Press. While Baker Hughes and Halliburton had reportedly ceased their operations several month after the invasion, SLB continues to supply Russia to this date but had introduced some limitations for their employees. At the same time, European-based oil companies such as Exxon, Shell and BP were under scrutiny, writing off billions in Russian assets. These American companies had profited from the removal of competing European rivals by increasing their earnings by up to 25% in late 2022. These accounts include Russian fossil fuel giants Gazprom and Rosneft. The U.S. and its sanction policies against Russia are at the forefront of the demand by Western countries to reduce Russian oil and gas revenues. SLB's company officials said that their workforce had actually declined by 10% since the invasion and that increased revenues from Russian operations were due to "normal market fluctuations".

== Effects on Russian economy ==
=== 2022 ===
In April 2022, Russia supplied 45% of EU's gas imports, earning $900 million a day. In the first two months after the invasion of Ukraine, Russia earned $66.5 billion from fossil fuel exports, and the EU accounted for 71% of that trade.

The Russian rouble reached its highest evaluation against the U.S. dollar and euro since 2015. However, this valuation has been referred to as a falsified "Potemkin rate" because sanctions prevent trading with foreign accounts or currencies. In May 2022, the Russian Central Bank last slashed its key rate by 300 basis points to 11% in order to stimulate local investments. The federal trade surplus was increased due to high prices for Russian commodity exports and a rapid fall in imports. On 27 May 2022, Russian Finance Minister Anton Siluanov stated that extra revenues from the sale of natural gas in the amount of €13.7 billion will be used to increase pension funds for retired individuals and families with children, as well for "special operations" in Ukraine. Russia has also increased energy exports to China and India to make up for decreased revenues in Europe. Bloomberg reported that in the first half of 2022, Russia pocketed an extra $24 billion from selling energy to both nations.

According to the IMF in its 11 April country report on Russia, the Russian economy is projected to see a 8.5% decrease in its real GDP in 2022, with inflation of 21.3% in that same year. Despite projected contractions in some economic sectors, Russia has so far managed to avoid defaulting on its foreign currency debt. Russian inflation came in at a two-decade high of 17.8% year-on-year in April, up from 16.7% in March, but inflation on basic commodities such as food and fuel were modest. Consumer price growth slowed sharply from 7.6% in March to 1.6% in April, in line with some Western countries.

According to a report by Meduza, an independent publication produced in Latvia, citizens of the Russian Federation faced surging inflation and unemployment, expensive credit, capital controls, restricted travel, and shortages of goods. Analysts have identified similarities with conditions in the decade following the collapse of the Soviet Union in 1991. According to official government data, however, unemployment in the Russian Federation has actually decreased since the war with Ukraine. Russia's Kaliningrad exclave faces ever-increasing isolation. A source close to the Kremlin told the Russian-language independent news website Meduza that "There's probably almost nobody who's happy with Putin. Businesspeople and many cabinet members are unhappy that the president started this war without thinking through the scale of the sanctions. Normal life under these sanctions is impossible." But, Vladimir Putin said that anyone who is driving by Mercedes-Benz S-Class 600 and consumes luxury products will continue to do it in the future.

On 27 June, Bloomberg reported that Russia is poised to default on its foreign debt (eurobonds), for the first time since 1918 after the Bolshevik revolution. According to the source, the country missed a debt payment due to sanctions on Russian banks. Finance Minister Siluanov dismissed the possible default status as a "farce", since Russia has plenty of funds to repay the debt. Associated Press reported that the official default on Russian's foreign debt would take time to be confirmed. Financial analysts described Russia's situation as unique, since it has extensive amounts of cash to fulfill its debt obligations.

In late July, the IMF upgraded Russia's GDP estimate by 2.5%, but some economists see a long-term problem for the Russian economy, and explain its resilience only by a short-term increase of energy prices. A Yale study projects a catastrophic outlook for Russian businesses if Western countries are able to keep up the sanctions against Russia's petrochemical industry. So far, Russia was able to leverage its economic power by cutting gas supplies to Europe, and play up its agricultural might as the largest wheat exporter globally. Western economists see long-lasting costs to the Russian economy from the exit of large foreign firms and brain drain, while Russia claims it has replaced those entities with domestic investments. Long term, Russia's economy will depend on the price development of fossil fuel energy, and Russia's continued economic alliances with countries that do not impose sanctions, including China, the Middle East, India, as well as nations in Africa and South America.

Russia's gross domestic product contracted 4% in the second quarter of 2022, revised from 6.5%, with a 15.3% drop in wholesale trade, and a 9.8% contraction in retail trade. Despite the ongoing sanctions, 47 of the world's biggest 200 companies still have not left Russia, particularly energy companies remain invested there. U.K. energy giant Shell and Japanese trading firms Mitsui and Mitsubishi hold double-digit stakes in the Sakhalin-2 oil and natural gas project. On 1 July 2022, Putin signed a decree to allow the government to seize the Sakhalin-2 oil and natural gas project but further attempts to formally nationalize the assets of international firms were paused when the bill did not make it through the State Duma before the 2022 summer recess. According to Western analysts, remaining companies have experienced expropriation and nationalization pressures, but officially Russia has denied that it is interested in such actions. In August 2022, Russia's trade and industry minister Denis Manturov stated, "we are not interested in the nationalization of enterprises or their removal". In October 2022, the decree was approved, allowing a Russian state-run company to seize ExxonMobil's 30% stake in the Sakhalin-1 oil and gas project, and to decide whether foreign shareholders, including Japan's SODECO, can retain their participation.

Russia pumps almost as much oil as before its 2022 invasion of Ukraine. Sales to the Middle East and Asia have made up for declining exports of gas and oil to Europe, and due to the higher price, Moscow made $20 billion monthly compared to $14.6 billion a year before (2021). Despite international sanctions, Russian energy sales have increased in value, and its exports have expanded with new financing options and payment methods for international buyers. According to the Institute of International Finance, "Russia is swimming in cash", earning $97 billion from oil and gas sales through July 2022. According to a former Russian energy executive, "there came a realization that the world needs oil, and nobody is brave enough to embargo 7.5 million barrels a day of Russian oil and oil products".

According to the Former First Deputy Chairman of the Central Bank of Russia Oleg Vyugin, sanctions imposed against Moscow over the conflict in Ukraine were only 30%–40% effective as Russia has found ways to overcome restrictions. He confirmed the contraction of the Russian economy by 4% in 2022 due to sanctions, but found this has been "no catastrophe" for the Russian Federation. Russia's current account surplus—the difference in value between exports and imports – has been soaring due to declining imports, but he warned that a further embargo on Russian exports could reduce crucial revenues. He also added that the impact of US and European export controls in the technology sector will be felt with some delay.

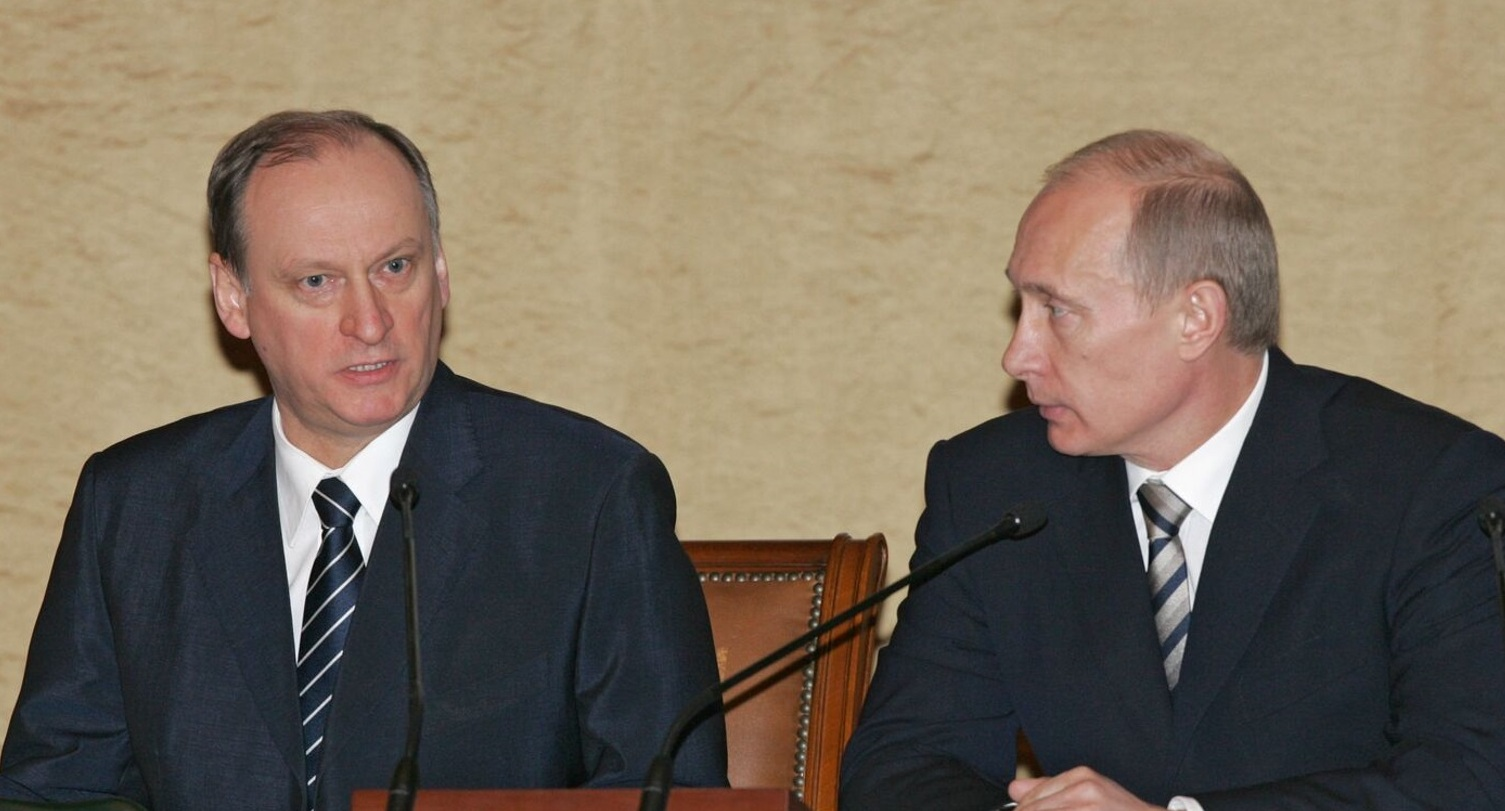
Putin's national security adviser Nikolai Patrushev downplayed the sanctions, saying that "Russia is reorienting itself away from the European market to the African, Asian and Latin American markets".

In October, Russia's exports of crude to China had again surpassed Saudi Arabia's for the 3rd month. Significant increases were seen through the Eastern Siberia–Pacific Ocean oil pipeline and seaborne shipments from Russia's European and Far Eastern ports, up 7.6% from a year ago, according to Chinese customs data. Increased Russian oil exports are particularly significant during an overall decline of 9.5% crude oil imports into China due to lower economic growth.

In December, when the European Union implemented its oil embargo and price cap on Russian crude, economic news channels reported a drop of Russian oil exports by 54% in the first week. A number of oil companies were no longer using Russian cargoes, including Shell corporation and ExxonMobil. But Russia was already sending nearly 90% of its oil to Asia before the sanctions were implemented. Shipowners in Asia as well were reportedly less likely to transport Russian crude after the European sanctions came into force. In late 2022, the Russian economy's relative resilience to Western sanctions was tested when financial sanctions seriously impacted Russia's VTB Bank, the country's No. 2 lender. VTB bank has frozen assets abroad worth around 600 billion roubles, and then purchased Otkritie FC Bank to make up for the loss (Italy's UniCredit was initially interested in a takeover). The Bank of Russia agreed to the sale for 233 billion roubles in cash and treasury bonds, increasing the share-value for Moscow-listed VTB. Dominant lender Sberbank, however, was less affected by financial sanctions and produced a quarterly profit. The central bank announced a bail-out of 555 billion roubles, and with the recent sale of Otkritie obtained a refund of 352 billion roubles.

In combination with the transition to renewable energy in Europe, European sanctions against Russian coal forced Russia to accelerate the shift of its coal exports to Asia. However, the limited capacity of the Trans-Siberian Railway remained a bottleneck for Russia's eastern reorientation.

According to Russian calculations, the country's economy shrank by 2.5% in 2022, showing better dynamics than expected by Western analysts. Both Russia's current trade account balance and foreign currency reserves increased significantly due to decreased imports from Western countries. Because of the increased expenditure for the 2022 Russian invasion of Ukraine, Moscow posted a record budget deficit of US$47.3 billion in 2022 (2.3% of GDP). Some of the reduction in trade with Western Europe was compensated by a record trade balance with China, US$190 billion in 2022. The Russian state as well as its citizens purchased a record amount of gold from Russian banks in 2022 (64 to 67 metric tons) due to tax-free profit from gold sales, and economic instability from Western sanctions. Gold, which significantly increased in value in late 2022 and early 2023, is seen as another backbone of the Russian economy. Russia attempts to create a gold-backed stablecoin to support its foreign trade in light of ongoing sanctions.

=== 2023 ===
Two financial reports from late 2022 and early 2023 concluded that only 8.5% or less than one out of ten companies had divested at least one subsidiary in Russia. In comparison, between economic regions, 18% of US companies with subsidiaries exited Russia, some 15% of Japanese firms and only 8.3% of EU firms have done the same. Among EU nations, Italian companies were least likely to exit from Russia. Particularly firms involved in lucrative resource extraction and agriculture as well as food production remain active there, but also pharmaceutical companies, which are exempt from sanctions. Dutch Unilever also conducts business as usual in Russia, even doubling its profits there in 2022. Quantitatively, those companies which left Russia (a total of 120) represent only 6.5% of total profits of all the firms active there. Even companies that planned a full withdrawal had struggled to pull out their businesses swiftly and comply with sanctions or NGO demands, according to business analysts.

Year on year, Russian car production fell 67% from 2021 to 2022. Truck production decreased 24%. A particularly drastic fall occurred in May 2022 when car production dropped 97%, but rebounded after some adaptations. Car sales fell 63%.

In March 2023, renewed assessments on the Russian economy were made public. Former Russian Central Bank official Alexandra Prokopenko had warned that "Russia's economy is entering a long-term regression". Western economists also expressed that Russia's resilience was only short term, and that subsequent to the oil and gas embargo by Europe in late 2022 and early 2023, the RF would enter a recessive period. Despite the dimming outlook, however, the Russian petroleum industry was able to shift its export market towards China and India but also Saudi Arabia, Turkey and Morocco. Russia's diesel exports in late winter of 2023 are heading for record despite EU sanctions, according to Bloomberg News. Shipments of diesel type fuels surged to 1.5 million barrels in the first two trimesters of March 2023, the highest volume since data was collected in 2016. The IMF predicts that Russia's economic growth would be at only 1%, down from 3.5% before 2014, when it annexed the Crimea from Ukraine. Russia's federal budget balance had hit a record deficit of 4 trillion rubles in late 2022, and economists predicted a further isolation of the Russian economy. Meanwhile, later that month, Mr. Putin and Chinese PM Xi Jinping had met again also to further increase economic cooperation particularly in the area of high technology and energy. Despite Russia's present slow growth, it has increased its military output, as the production of finished metal goods increased by 7% in 2022 due to the conflict in Ukraine.

In early April, Bloomberg News noted that Russia's seaborne crude oil exports were soaring due to the constrained pipeline deliveries to Western Europe. According to ship-tracking data, the nation's shipments surged by 1 million barrels/d to a new high of 4.13 million barrels. Data also indicates that most sales were conducted below the price cap of $60/barrel, an indication that the price cap is somewhat effective to limit Russia's financial gains. Even the announced OPEC+ production cut, as a wider move to stabilize oil prices, has been viewed as not constraining the flow of oil further. The loss of pipeline markets increased Russia's maritime shipments by an additional 500,000 barrels/d, including record deliveries to China and India, but smaller flows to Turkey. Japan also carved out an exemption for itself, buying Russian oil above the price cap, just below $70/BBL with a volume of 748,000 barrels in the first two months of 2023. The situation for Japan has been interpreted as a gain for Russia, avoiding further isolation of its economy. Later that month, economic data showed that Russia's crude oil export were back to pre-war levels with India as well as China paying above the price-cap set by Western nations.

In mid 2023, new data showed that Russia's economic decline was well below the value analysts had predicted earlier. The fall-out for the Russian economy was already much less severe in 2022, namely a 2.1% reduction in GDP rather than the double digit numbers the West forecasted. Meanwhile, the Russian Central Bank held its interest rate at 7.5% for June to allow more borrowing by the Russian economy that still experiences a significant inflation risk. China-Russia trade surged as well reaching $93.8 billion since January 2023, a 75.6% increase, the largest since Western sanctions were implemented, while much of the world has seen declining trade volumes with the Russian Federation due to broad sanctions. Its economy is now predicted to only fall by 0.7%, in line with many Western nations. In late July, the Bank of Russia did increase its key rate by 100 base points to 8.50% in order to combat inflation that is still problematic for the Russian consumer and companies alike.

Due to the sanctions, Indian oil refiners started using Chinese yuan for payments of Russian oil imports as an alternative to the U.S. dollar. The accumulation of the Indian rupee had been problematic for Russia-India economic relations, as India bought more energy commodities from Russia while India could not sell sufficient trade goods to Russia. The problem was discussed between Lavrov and Indian representatives in Goa on the sidelines of the Shanghai Cooperation Organisation meeting.

Other limitations on the effect of sanctions were seen in July 2023, when crude oil prices were up 8% and with that trend Urals oil was again selling above US$60 per barrel. The recent decline in Russian oil revenue was due to lower prices in late 2022, partly because of the price cap or discounts. According to previous reports, Russia has also resorted to deploying old and uninsured tankers from its western ports, where such discounted oil cargo was quickly snapped up by Asian traders. Furthermore, Goldman Sachs estimates a steady uptick in oil prices with a target of $86 per barrel by the end of the 2023.

In late June, the 11th round of sanctions were implemented with Switzerland again participating also to limit the purchase of Russian securities with any international currency. At the same time, however, it was clear that many European and American companies have circumvented such measures and still supply Russia with consumer goods or even industrial components. In August 2023, the value of the Russian currency dropped to its lowest level since the onset of the hostilities and inflation remains a major problem for its domestic economy. Russia is using offshore intermediaries located in nations that do not impose direct sanctions to acquire sanctioned goods. A recent investigation into confiscated Russian war materials in Ukraine shows that two thirds of these components were equipped with microprocessors of Western origin. While sanctions against Russia indeed exert considerable effects on the Russian economy, particularly in the civilian sector, and price inflation remains a great problem for Russian citizens, so far no results could be ascertained with regard to damage to the Russian war machine in Ukraine. In terms of direct economic relations with neighbouring countries in Central Asia, current sanctions have increased trade activities particularly with Kyrgyzstan, Armenia and Kazakhstan. At the same time, maritime shipments of petrochemicals carried out by Russia's merchante marine and intermediaries are employing schemes that circumvent effective sanctions against Russia's global distribution network for fossil fuels.

According to a report by the Diplomatic Service of the European Union, EU sanctions on the Russian economy have shown a clear effect. OECD also reported that the outlook for 2023 remains "bleak", forecasting a reduction of Russia's GDP by up to 2.5%. Particularly the manufacturing sector experienced a 13% annual loss for 2022, with the high and medium-high technology manufacturing sector recording a 13% annual loss due to its reliance on components produced in the EU, the UK and the U.S. The report also concluded the de-coupling of Russia' economy from the West will further increase as the decline in imports of non-energy goods to the EU will experience a decline by another 75% in the first quarter of 2023 and an even greater decline in Russian energy imports to the EU by 80%. While the decline in energy exports by Russia was seen as an effect from the implemented price cap, a big part of the reduction was observed as an effect of the overall price decline of all fossil fuels. The overall production of Russian crude has not declined significantly. On the gas side also, Russia was able to keep up its overall production capacity in 2022/23 despite intended cuts in exports to the EU, exports to the EU have increased again in the first half of 2023. Some Central European countries, such as Austria, currently import the same amount of gas as before the invasion. Moscow has also been discussing increased export channels of gas using Kazakhstan and Uzbekistan as transit countries for its exports to China. But clearly the initial budgetary surplus due to high energy prices in the first half of 2022 had been completely erased with revenues dropping by 52% for January–April 2023.

In early September, Russian maritime exports of petroleum reached an eight week high, particularly through Western ports as Russia is maintaining transports through the arctic shipping routes. Earlier, Russia reduced oil production according to an agreed OPEC decision to lower the overall supply in global markets. This development is particularly significant when the 11th round of sanctions by the U.S. and EU in July of the same year came into effect. The Russian finance ministry projected that oil and gas revenues would decline by 23% in 2023, which indicates a clear effect of sanctions imposed by the West.

On 6 September, the Russian Central Bank announced it would increase the sale of foreign currencies by 830% later that month to control the volatility of the ruble, and to support the repayment of a $3 billion Eurobond debt due on 16 September. The ruble hit a 16-month low in August 2023 because of extensive international sanctions. The sale generates a total of 150 billion rubles worth $1.5 billion. The central bank also increased interest rates to 12%. A year before, the state bank missed the repayment of Eurobonds due to the exclusion of Russia's financial institutions from the international payment system, although it was holding plenty of cash to fulfill its debt obligation.

In July 2023, the price for Urals crude for the first time topped the price of $60 per barrel since price cap sanctions were implemented, and this was seen as the first real test whether the price cap on Russian oil is effective. Urals oil is a mixture of crude from different Russian oil fields and the main type of oil Russia exports. Many nations such as India and China had been purchasing Russian oil at a discount set by Russia, and the current price increase triggered by a renewed OPEC cut and voluntary reduction of Russian crude production has been seen as a critical factor that could undermine the sanctions implemented by the E.U, the U.S. and other Western nations. Most maritime exports of Russian crude to India and China do not directly involve E.U. or US-based insurance services, it remains questionable whether the price cap on Russian crude is the reason for the decline in revenues. Russia itself reduced discounts on crude exports and at the same time intentionally cut tax revenue streams from exported oil. In September 2023, G7/EU paused its Russian oil cap reviews due to those reasons

In late September, it became clear that the Russian oil export industry had largely evaded most economic sanctions. As the price for Urals crude topped the $60 per barrel price cap set by Western nations, and many insurers got weary of declaring such cargo at this pre-set price, the applicability of such measures in the maritime shipping business was again seriously questioned. As non-Western insurance carriers have accounted for two thirds of all Russian maritime shipments, confirming earlier reports of such developments, the effects of oil industry-related sanctions were again much less severe than Western analyst had predicted. Later, Russia declared a temporary diesel and gasoline export ban due to high domestic demand.

On 28 September, the European Bank for Reconstruction and Development (EBRD) announced new estimates that the Russian economy would see 1.5% growth in that year despite earlier assessments by financial analysts that the Russian economy would decline by the same amount. Economists noted that the Russian export industry is more resilient than previously thought, particularly by evading the price cap for Russian crude and by exploring alternative markets for its petroleum products. Values for these main Russian energy products had only increased since mid summer of 2023, and Russian businesses had exploited blindspots and loopholes mainly through increased economic activities with nations of Central Asia that do not impose sanctions against the Russian Federation. The EBRD report also concluded that Russia's economic activity particularly for household consumption and public spending appeared robust, contradicting recent trends of Russia's expected economic decline.

In October, Russian companies had again significantly increased fossil fuel revenues due to higher prices on the global markets. Since May 2023, the price for Russian crude increased from US$55 to almost US$78 per barrel particularly for Russian crude that sells into Asia. Russian crude shipments from Kosmino had entirely escaped price controls implemented by the EU and the U.S. Likely shipping documents were falsified or otherwise altered to avoid the price cap. Both Saudi Arabia and Russia reduced the production of crude to drive the price upward in order to gain more profits from exports. As a result, even in Western markets current prices for Russian oil remained above the price cap.

Gazprom piped gas exports to Europe have fallen again in 2023, likely to the level of 29bcm compared to 62bcm in 2022 and 140bcm in 2021. There has been little change in exports to China or Turkey of around 20bcm each for 2023, Russias other main export customers.

A white paper by the Hinrich Foundation has evaluated the impact of sanctions against Russia based on an econometric analysis by Oxford Economics. The analysis concluded that trade volumes of the Russian Federation had returned to pre-war levels through increased economy activity with India and China. Russia had acquired new logistical solutions, and a lack of multilateral support for punitive economic measures were the reasons for the ineffectual outcome of these sanctions. Furthermore, sanctions on the import of crucial components and commercial goods had also been circumvented by increased trade with China, Turkey, and Armenia, the paper concluded. While some trade sanctions, however, had impacted the Russian economy soon after they were implemented, the effect dissipated considerably the longer the sanctions were in place.

In early November, the value of the Russian ruble increased slightly reaching a three-month high of 90 against the USD. The Russian key interest rate rose to 15% in October. Capital control measures, including the mandatory FX sales for Russian exporters imposed by Moscow were also effective to support the value of the currency. On 2 November, the U.S. announced new sweeping sanctions against Russian energy exports and limits on foreign currency payments by Russia's Central Bank, which was thought to be another reason for the higher value of the ruble, forcing Russian banks to pay in ruble. Stock indices for Russian companies were also up. The ruble's overall decline is a major problem for the Russian economy as it increases inflation particularly for imported goods.

In late November, Russian Transport Minister Vitaly Savelyev announced that Russia had lost 76 passenger planes as a result of sanctions after they were confiscated or declared unsafe. Many of them were registered in Ireland and Bermuda worth at least US$10 billion. According to Russian sources, sanctions against Russia's aviation industry led to multiple safety incidences and malfunctions as spare parts and repair components could no longer be purchased. As of November, Russia's airlines had 1,302 planes in use, with 1,167 of them designated for transporting passengers. As a result of these wide reaching international sanctions by the EU and the U.S., 40% of Russia's civil airfleet had been blocked through cancelling leasing agreements by Western countries. Russia later resumed flights to just 11 countries that did not participate in these measures. As of late 2023, 400 planes remain stranded outside of Russia but relinquishing all of them would effectively leave Russia without a viable aviation fleet.

2023 saw a fall in Russia's oil and gas tax revenues of 24% to 8.8 trillion roubles ($99.4 billion) compared to 2022 mainly due to lower oil prices.

=== 2024 ===
Elvira Nabiullina, who administers the central bank of Russia, remarked in July 2024 with respect to the sanctions that the Russian government has joined other countries within the international institution known as BRICS in discussions over a financial bypass effort called the "BRICS Bridge" payments system, which in the future could link those nations' economies more closely. She additionally advocated in the short and intermediate term for "multiple choice solutions", including the use of cryptocurrencies and other digital assets, in order to facilitate commerce in a way that significantly counters the sanctions. The news agency Reuters stated at the time that Russia's previously "booming trade" with China, India, Turkey, the United Arab Emirates, and other countries had faced fundamental challenges given the tightening of Western backed efforts against organizations such as the Moscow Stock Exchange. Multiple details in terms of the Russian government's future financial plans cannot be made publicly known given Russian laws on national security. Nabiullina did remark, "Businesses have become very flexible".

Russia's dependence on the Chinese yuan increased heavily after its invasion of Ukraine. In 2022, China accounted for 40% of Russia's imports. However, by August 2024, Russian transactions with Chinese banks (especially smaller ones) were largely closed. Due to strict secondary sanctions, Russia could not exchange money with China. As many as 98% of Chinese banks rejected direct yuan payments from Russia.

Due to sanctions, Russian nickel, copper and palladium mining and smelting company Norilsk Nickel planned to move some of its copper smelting to China and establish a joint venture with a Chinese company. Finished copper products would be sold as Chinese products to avoid Western sanctions. China is Norilsk Nickel's largest export market since 2023.

With the Russian truck maker Kamaz suffering from sanctions, the import of trucks to Russia increased during the conflict. Norwegian researchers estimated in a 2024 study, that Russia increased the import of sanctioned trucks from a volume of Euro 0,8 billion to Euro 5,7 billion between 2021 and 2023. The majority coming from European companies or their subsidiaries in China, with Daimler Truck and its subsidiary Beijing Foton Daimler selling the most in 2023, followed by Volkswagen (MAN and Scania) and its partner Sinotruk. Volvo was third. Although all European companies in question assured to abide sanctions, at 19 November 2024 the researchers found 3526 new trucks from European companies or their subsidiaries were offered for sale by intermediate retailers on the Russian marketplace Avito.ru.

== Collateral damage for individuals using Russian securities market infrastructure in Russia and abroad ==
As a result of the sanctions imposed on the National Settlement Depository by the Council Implementing Regulation (EU) 2022/878 of 3 June 2022, its securities accounts at Euroclear and Clearstream were frozen. Consequently, investors using the Russian securities market infrastructure lost access to securities they had purchased and which were held at Euroclear and Clearstream: transferring securities and receiving payments from them was no longer possible. Due to the sanctions imposed on the Saint Petersburg Stock Exchange by the U.S. Office of Foreign Assets Control's Executive Order of 2 November 2023, it suspended trading in foreign securities, effectively preventing investors from disposing of these securities. The sanctions imposed on the Moscow Exchange, the National Settlement Depository (Russia) and the National Clearing Centre (Russia) by the Executive Order of the Office of Foreign Assets Control of the United States Department of the Treasury of 12 June 2024 and the similar sanctions imposed by the United Kingdom's authorities deprived investors of the last remaining means of selling purchased foreign securities and receiving income from them.

As Zhanna Nemtsova pointed out, these consequences for private investors should not be confused with personal sanctions against specific individuals, since the vast majority of private investors who lost access to their investments are not even mentioned on various sanctions lists. According to the joint report by the Social Foresight Group and the Boris Nemtsov Foundation for Freedom on the freezing of private capital, which itself is not subject to sanctions, due to the imposition of EU sanctions against the Russian financial system, assets worth approximately €90 billion were affected, 20 percent of which belonged to individuals. The total number of affected investors was estimated at 5 million and included not only Russian citizens and companies, but also citizens and companies from other countries (approximately 40% of the total), including EU tax residents. According to the research, the investment volume of 37.5% of the affected investors was up to €1,176, and for 42.7% it was up to €11,765.

According to the report, approximately 1.5 million investors were able to sell their frozen securities by taking advantage of the opportunity provided by the Decree of the President of the Russian Federation of 8 November 2023 No. 844. Under the scheme established by this decree, securities held in securities accounts of the National Settlement Depository (Russia) at Euroclear and Clearstream, and belonging to the affected investors-Russian tax residents, were sold to foreign buyers who held "S"-type bank accounts in Russian banks in conformity with the Decree of the President of the Russian Federation of 5 March 2022 No. 95 and the decision of the Board of directors of the Central Bank of the Russian Federation of 8 March 2022. The foreign buyers paid for the securities by transferring funds from their "S"-type bank accounts in Russian banks to the sellers' regular bank accounts in Russian banks. The securities were credited to special transit securities accounts of buyers, which had been opened in Russian custodians pursuant to the decision of the Board of directors of the Central Bank of the Russian Federation of 8 December 2023, and could subsequently be transferred to securities accounts of buyers at foreign custodians. It was stipulated that this scheme could only be applied to investors-Russian tax residents whose securities totaled no more than 100,000 rubles. As follows from the report, approximately 3.5 million affected investors were unable or unwilling to use it and still lacked access to their investments.

Zhanna Nemtsova emphasized that the proposed mechanism for unblocking frozen investments by applying for personal permits from the Ministry of Finance of the relevant European country (Belgium or Luxembourg) is ineffective because it implies that, despite the Ministry of Finance itself verifying all relevant circumstances and documents, the applicant must have a qualified guarantor whose services typically cost at least €10,000. The total cost of legal and other specialist assistance in unblocking frozen investments can reach up to several tens of thousands EUR, rendering this procedure completely pointless for owners of small investment amounts. Furthermore, the review conducted by the Ministry of Finance is time-consuming, and obtaining a permit does not guarantee the investor prompt processing of their request by the custodian, often leading to additional pre-litigation proceedings.

== Effect on global food supply ==
Western countries have accused Russia to interfere with wheat exports from Ukraine due to armed confrontations in Odesa and other Ukrainian ports. Later the Kremlin pushed back and accused the West of imposing sanctions on the Russian economy that hinder the export of wheat from the Russian Federation. Spokesperson Dmitry Peskov referred to Russia as "a rather reliable grain exporter". During a meeting with Italian Prime Minister Mario Draghi, Putin confirmed Russia's willingness to make "a significant contribution to overcoming the food crisis through the export of grain and fertilizer" but mentioned Western sanctions as an obstacle.

The head of the African Union, Senegalese President Macky Sall, remarked that the side effects of the EU's decision to expel many Russian banks from SWIFT will hurt the ability of African countries to pay for imported food and fertilizers from Russia. French President Emmanuel Macron responded that difficulties have nothing to do with EU sanctions.

On 30 June, Russia withdrew its troops from Snake Island in an avowed goodwill gesture to not obstruct U.N. attempts to open a humanitarian corridor, allowing grains to be shipped from Ukraine. Later on 16 July, major news outlets reported that Kyiv is definitely a step closer to being able to export grain through its Black Sea ports after talks with Russia, facilitated by Turkey, and the United Nations. On 22 July 2022, the facilitated exports of Ukrainian grain via the Black Sea amid the ongoing war has been described as "a beacon of hope" by the UN Secretary-General António Guterres during the signing ceremony in Istanbul, Turkey.

On 14 September, UN Secretary-General António Guterres reiterated his concerns over a constrained fertilizer supply from Russia due to the 2022 Russian invasion of Ukraine and subsequent economic sanctions. According to the source, UN diplomats held discussions to re-open the Togliatti-Odesa pipeline carrying ammonia. President Volodymyr Zelenskyy had offered such a move in exchange for the release of prisoners of war held by Russia. But TASS news agency quoted Kremlin spokesman Dmitry Peskov, who dismissed such an idea, as saying "are people and ammonia the same thing?".

At the 38th meeting of the Standing Committee for Economic and Commercial Cooperation (COMCEC) of the Organization of Islamic Cooperation (OIC) in Istanbul, Erdogan remarked that over 11 million tonnes of grain had been transported through the Black Sea Grain Corridor since the successful implementation of the Black Sea Grain Initiative. He also noted that the opening of the grain corridor through the Black Sea showed that a diplomatic solution is possible in the conflict between Russia and Ukraine.

In April 2023, the war in Ukraine and financial sanctions against Russia had also disturbed global spot markets for grains. While the price of wheat and other foods in North Africa had actually increased, a glut of Ukrainian wheat in Eastern Europe had depressed local price levels there, causing a differential effect that was detrimental to the global economy. In Tunisia, inflationary pressures in particular contributed to political instability, and increased illegal immigration into Western and Southern Europe.

On 17 July, Russia did not renew its participation in the agreement because it claims that restrictions on insurance, transport and financing are hindering Russian exports of grain and fertiliser.

Since then a number of attempts were made to renew the Black Sea Grain Initiative, but at the same time, the war in Southern Ukraine had destroyed extensive amounts of food reserves destined for poorer regions in Africa. On 4 September 2023, Putin was discussing the renewal of the initiative with Erdogan during a meeting in Sochi. Erdogan has expressed hope for a renewal of the grain deal and said "we, as Türkiye, will reach a solution that will meet the expectations in a short time". Putin responded by saying that he is open to negotiations on this issue "as soon" restrictions on Russian grain exports would be lifted. Russia would also ship up to one million tons of grain to Türkiye at reduced prices for subsequent processing at Turkish plants and shipping to countries most in need, according to an Iranian source. Russia was also close to a deal to supply Burkina Faso, Zimbabwe, Mali, Somalia, the Central African Republic and Eritrea with up to 50,000 tonnes of grain. A few days earlier, UN Secretary-General António Guterres communicated with Russian Foreign Minister Sergei Lavrov to implement "a set of concrete proposals" in order to revive the deal. China, a major beneficiary of the Ukrainian grain deal, also appreciated the dialogue between Türkiye and Russia to reinstate the agreement.

Ukraine managed to move 13 million tons across the Black Sea, on 430 vessels, since the grain initiative ceased.

== See also ==
- International sanctions during the Russo-Ukrainian War
- International sporting sanctions during the Russian invasion of Ukraine
- List of companies that applied sanctions during the Russo-Ukrainian War
- 2022 Russia–European Union gas dispute – Fossil fuel financing-related conflicts
- 2022 Russian debt default – Credit crisis in Russia in 2022
- Russian financial crisis (2014–2016) – Period of devaluation of the Russian rouble, linked to the Crimean conflict
- Countering America's Adversaries Through Sanctions Act – 2017 U.S. law sanctioning Iran, North Korea and Russia
- International Emergency Economic Powers Act – United States federal law
