= Task Force KleptoCapture =

2022 US sanctions task force focused on Russia

Task Force KleptoCapture was a United States Department of Justice unit established in March 2022 with the goal of enforcing sanctions on Russian oligarchs in response to the Russian invasion of Ukraine.

The Task force was shut down by the new federal Trump administration on 5 February 2025.

== Background ==
Dating back to the outbreak of the pro-Russian unrest in Eastern Ukraine in 2014, the United States imposed numerous economic sanctions against the Russian government, military, and strategic sectors of the economy for its actions. After the Russian invasion of Ukraine in February 2022, the United States imposed new sanctions on Russia and strengthened existing ones.

President Biden's statements during the 2022 State of the Union speech

During his State of the Union Address that same year, U.S. President Joe Biden announced this effort:

Tonight, I say to the Russian oligarchs and the corrupt leaders who’ve bilked billions of dollars off this violent regime: No more.

The United States — I mean it. The United States Department of Justice is assembling a dedicated task force to go after the crimes of the Russian oligarchs.

We're joining with European Allies to find and seize their yachts, their luxury apartments, their private jets. We're coming for your ill-begotten gains.

The day after Biden's speech, U.S. Attorney General Merrick B. Garland announced the formation of Task Force KleptoCapture, an inter-agency effort.

== Structure ==
The leader of the Task Force was initially described as "a veteran corruption prosecutor" from the U.S. Attorney's Office for the Southern District of New York, assigned to the U.S. Deputy Attorney General's Office. On 3 March 2022, the prosecutor was revealed as Andrew Adams, who had earlier worked as co-chief of the Southern District of New York's Money Laundering and Transnational Criminal Enterprises. His previous work included the prosecutions of thief-in-law Razhden Shulaya, as well as the asset forfeiture case against Bitcoin money launderer Charlie Shrem.

Others announced as part of the DOJ's team included deputy directors from the United States Department of Justice National Security Division and United States Department of Justice Criminal Division leading more than a dozen attorneys from those divisions, as well as the Tax Division, Civil Division, and U.S. Attorneys’ Offices across the United states. The attorneys listed on KleptoCapture court filings were some of the most experienced prosecutors in the Justice Department.

It was also announced that the task force would incorporate officials from the Federal Bureau of Investigation, United States Marshals Service, Internal Revenue Service, United States Postal Inspection Service, U.S. Immigration and Customs Enforcement, and United States Secret Service. The principal goal of the task force was to impose sanctions set against these Russian individuals, to freeze and seize the assets that the U.S. government claimed were proceeds of their illegal involvement with the Russian government and the invasion of Ukraine.

== Activities ==
B-roll from seizure of $90M yacht of sanctioned Russian oligarch Vekselberg by Spain at U.S. request

United States Attorney General Merrick Garland announces the seizure of the motoryacht Tango.

On 11 March 2022, United States President Joseph R. Biden signed Executive Order 14068, "Prohibiting Certain Imports, Exports, and New Investment With Respect to Continued Russian Federation Aggression," an order of economic sanctions prohibiting the trade in luxury goods.

At the same time, the Treasury listed specific assets of Viktor Vekselberg, worth an estimated $180 million: an Airbus A319-115 jet and the motor yacht Tango as targets for seizure. Estimates of the Tango's value ranged from $90 million, according to the U.S. Department of Justice, to $120 million, according to the website Superyachtfan.com).

On 25 March 2022, an FBI Special Agent filed an affidavit in support of seizure of the Tango with the United States District Court for the District of Columbia. The affidavit warrant stated probable cause to seize the Tango for suspect violations of 18 U.S.C. § 1349 (conspiracy to commit bank fraud), 50 U.S.C. § 1705 (International Emergency Economic Powers Act), and 18 U.S.C. § 1956 (money laundering), and that the seizure was authorized by American statutes on civil and criminal asset forfeiture.

On 4 April 2022, Magistrate Judge Zia M. Faruqui signed an Order approving the seizure of the superyacht. Judge Faruqui concluded his order, stating "the seizure of the Target Property is just the beginning of the reckoning that awaits those who would facilitate Putin's atrocities. Neither the Department of Justice, nor history, will be kind to the oligarchs who chose the wrong side. […] The Department of Justice's seizure echoes the message of the brave Ukrainian soldiers of Snake Island."

The Civil Guard of Spain and U.S. federal agents of both the United States Department of Justice and the United States Department of Homeland Security cooperated in seizing the Tango in Mallorca. A United States Department of Justice press release said that the seizure of the Tango was by request of Task Force KleptoCapture.

On 6 June 2022, the United States was authorized to seize two of Roman Abramovich’s aircraft, a Boeing 787-8 and a Gulfstream G650ER worth more than $400 million. A United States press release said that the seizures were requested by the U.S. Attorney's Office for the Southern District of New York, working with Task Force KleptoCapture.

On 8 August 2022, a U.S. federal magistrate judge signed an order authorizing the United States to seize the private airplane of Andrei Skoch, a sanctioned Russian oligarch and member of Russia's Duma. U.S. press releases described the airplane as an Airbus A319-100, tail number P4-MGU, and valued at more than $90 million. The plane had previously been blocked by the U.S. Treasury's Office of Foreign Assets Control (OFAC). The press release also noted that the U.S. Attorney's Office for the Southern District of New York had led the investigation in partnership with the KleptoCapture Task Force.

In February 2024, US Deputy Attorney General Lisa Monaco announced that the KleptoCapture Task Force had "restrained, seized, and obtained judgments to forfeit nearly $700 million in assets from Russian enablers and charged more than 70 individuals for violating international sanctions and export controls levied against Russia."

== Termination ==
On 5 February 2025, following the election of Donald Trump, United States Attorney General Pam Bondi shut down Task Force KleptoCapture.
