= SWIFT ban against Russian banks =

Sanction against Russia for the 2022 invasion of Ukraine

The SWIFT ban against some Russian banks is one of several international sanctions against Russia imposed by the European Union and other western countries as a result of its invasion of Ukraine, aimed at weakening the country's economy to end the invasion by hindering Russian access to the SWIFT financial transaction processing system.

== Background ==
SWIFT is used by thousands of financial institutions in more than 200 countries, previously including Russia, and provides a secure messaging system to facilitate cross-border money transfers.

According to the Russian National SWIFT Association, around 300 banks use SWIFT in Russia, with more than half of Russian credit institutions represented in SWIFT. Russia has the second highest userbase after the United States.

If Russia were to be excluded from SWIFT, its interbank payment transactions will become significantly more complex, and the country's ability to trade goods and exchange currencies would be significantly reduced, making payment be only possible in cash.

== Timeline ==
=== 24 February 2022 ===
The Ukrainian Government asked for Russia to be banned from using SWIFT upon the beginning of the invasion. Ukrainian Minister of Foreign Affairs Dmytro Kuleba said: "The world must act immediately. The future of Europe and the world is at stake." He proposed immediate "destructive sanctions" against Russia, including exclusion from the SWIFT banking system, complete isolation of Russia in all formats, the provision of weapons, equipment and humanitarian aid provision. Later that day, Kuleba called on Ukraine's partners to sever all diplomatic relations with Russia. However, other EU member states were reluctant, both because European lenders held $30 billion in foreign banks' exposure to Russia and because Russia had developed the SPFS alternative.

=== 25 February 2022 ===
French Minister of Finance Bruno Le Maire urged Russia to be expelled from SWIFT for its invasion of Ukraine. Le Maire described the SWIFT ban as the last resort and "the financial nuclear weapon". Germany's Chancellor Olaf Scholz, said it was refraining from excluding Russia because Russian gas accounts for a large share of energy supplies to Germany and other parts of Europe. At the same time, Scholz suggested that such a step would be possible at a later stage. The idea of excluding Russia was also supported by US President Joe Biden, who said the ban was possible, although that "that's not the position that the rest of Europe wishes to take."

Later that day, German Federal Minister of Finance Christian Lindner reiterated that his country did not object to such a sanction. Lindner said his country was ready to exclude Russia from SWIFT, but that the consequences for the country's economy needed to be calculated first. The foreign ministers of the Baltic states requested Russia be banned from SWIFT.

=== 26 February 2022 ===
On 26 February 2022, Cyprus, Italy, Hungary and Germany confirmed that they would not block the Russian exclusion from SWIFT. US officials and their EU counterparts initially considered the involvement of individual banks and organizations, and the entire Russian economy. The United States also imposed other sanctions against Russia, targeting banking, technological and aerospace sector of Moscow.

=== 1 March 2022 ===
The European Union, United Kingdom, Canada, and the United States finally agreed to remove seven Russian banks from the SWIFT messaging system:

- Bank Otkritie
- Novikombank
- Promsvyazbank
- Rossiya Bank
- Sovcombank
- VEB
- VTB

EU ambassadors have decided not to impose restrictions on the country's largest bank, Sberbank, which is partly owned by Russian gas giant Gazprom. Gazprombank was also not sanctioned.

=== 3 June 2022 ===
The EU removed Sberbank from SWIFT as part of the 6th package of sanctions.

=== 21 Nov 2024 ===
Washington imposed new sanctions on Russia's Gazprombank that prevent the state-controlled lender from handling any new energy-related transactions that touch the U.S. financial system. The U.S. also targeted around 50 other Russian banks and the Bank of Russia's System for Transfer of Financial Messages (SPFS). Hungary and Slovakia, both of which have long-term contracts with Russian energy giant Gazprom, are studying the changes. Russian Deputy Energy Minister Pavel Sorokin declined to comment when asked if Gazprombank would continue receiving payments from European clients.

"EU payments for energy resources through Gazprombank will likely become impossible at the end of 2024," Sinara Investment Bank analysts said.

== See also ==
- 2022 Russian debt default – Credit crisis in Russia in 2022
- 2022 Russia–European Union gas dispute – Fossil fuel financing-related conflicts
