= Prohibiting Russian Uranium Imports Act =

2024 US Federal law

- Long title: To prohibit the importation into the United States of unirradiated low-enriched uranium that is produced in the Russian Federation, and for other purposes.
- Enacted by: the 118th United States Congress
- Effective: August 11, 2024

Citations
- Public law: Pub. L. 118–62 (text) (PDF)

Legislative history
- Introduced in the House of Representatives as H.R. 1042 by Cathy McMorris Rodgers (R–WA) on February 14, 2023; Committee consideration by House Energy and Commerce; Passed the House on December 11, 2023 (voice vote); Passed the Senate on April 30, 2024 (unanimous consent); Signed into law by President Joe Biden on May 13, 2024

The Prohibiting Russian Uranium Imports Act (H.R. 1042) is a U.S. law enacted on May 13, 2024, banning low-enriched uranium imports from Russia. Approved unanimously, the legislation aims to reduce U.S. reliance on Russian nuclear materials, limit financial resources available to Russia and revive the American nuclear fuel industry.

== Background ==
Historically, the United States was an international leader in uranium enrichment, a critical resource for nuclear energy production. However, post-Cold War agreements, including the Megatons to Megawatts Program, where the United States Enrichment Corporation (USEC), which was created by Congress in 1992 to be executive agent with Russia, failed in its primary mission of modernizing U.S. enrichment capability, gradually going bankrupt by 2013, shutting down vintage enrichment plants without a replacement technology, despite the enrichment purchased from Russia being lower than its own costs of production, which gradually shifted the market in Russia's favor.[ ] By 2013, domestic uranium enrichment had ceased entirely, leaving the U.S. reliant on imports from Russia and European suppliers.

In 2023, Russia was the largest single foreign provider of enriched uranium for U.S. civilian nuclear reactors, highlighting decades of dependence. This reliance came under scrutiny following Russia's invasion of Ukraine and ensuing geopolitical tensions. While the U.S. and the E.U. imposed sanctions on Russian fossil fuels, uranium imports were initially excluded due to the lack of viable alternatives.

Moreover, the Biden administration's climate agenda prioritized nuclear power as a cornerstone of emissions-free electricity generation. Sustaining the growth of next-generation nuclear reactors without Russian supplies, however, requires rebuilding a robust domestic uranium enrichment industry.

== Provisions ==
=== Prohibition of Uranium Imports ===
The primary provision of H.R. 1042 is a comprehensive ban on the importation of low-enriched uranium (LEU) produced in the Russian Federation or by a Russian entity. To achieve this, the Act amends Section 3112A of the USEC Privatization Act and aims to close loopholes by prohibiting uranium obtained through exchanges, swaps, or other transactions designed to circumvent the law.

=== Waivers for Energy Security ===
The legislation allows for the issuance of special waivers under specific circumstances. These waivers enable the importation of Russian uranium if deemed essential to maintaining the stability and reliability of the U.S. nuclear energy sector. Under this system, the Secretary of Energy, in consultation with the Secretaries of State and Commerce, may authorize restricted imports if no viable alternative source exists to sustain U.S. nuclear reactors or companies, or if such imports are deemed to be in the national interest. These waivers are subject to strict annual import caps, which progressively decrease from 2024 to 2027. All waivers must terminate by January 1, 2028.

The enforcement of these import limitations is overseen by the Secretary of Commerce, who is tasked with implementing the annual import caps in a way that minimizes burdens on the commercial nuclear industry.

=== Exemptions for National Security ===
Certain imports are explicitly exempted from the restrictions, such as uranium imports for national security or nonproliferation purposes under Department of Energy contracts, as well as imports involving non-uranium isotopes.

Additionally, the Act includes a series of conforming amendments to the USEC Privatization Act to align with the newly introduced restrictions, streamline regulatory requirements, and clarify enforcement mechanisms.

The restrictions under this Act will remain in effect until December 31, 2040.

== Legislative history ==
H.R. 1042 was introduced in the House of Representatives on February 14, 2023, by Representative Cathy McMorris Rodgers (R‑WA 5th) and subsequently garnered the support of six additional Republican cosponsors. The bill was referred to the House Committee on Energy and Commerce, where it underwent initial review and discussion.

After committee deliberations, the bill was reported out with amendments on December 1, 2023. The House passed the bill on December 11, 2023 by voice vote under a House procedure called “suspension of the rules” which is typically used to pass non-controversial bills. Following House approval, the bill was sent to the Senate for consideration. In the Senate, H.R. 1042 was brought directly to the floor for consideration.

Despite broad bipartisan support, Senator Ted Cruz (R‑TX) blocked the bill as a bargaining chip in unrelated legislative disputes. The legislation was stalled for months until Cruz dropped his opposition.

On April 30, 2024, Senator Sheldon Whitehouse (D‑RI) requested unanimous consent to proceed with the bill, which was read and passed without objection. The unanimous approval process expedited its passage, reflecting the broad bipartisan consensus on this legislation.

President Joe Biden signed the bill into law on May 13, 2024.

== Impact ==
The enactment of the Prohibiting Russian Uranium Imports Act marks a notable change in U.S. energy policy by targeting a significant reliance on Russian enriched uranium, which accounted for 27% of U.S. enriched uranium demand for U.S. civilian nuclear power reactors as recently as 2023.

Since the enactment of the Act, the U.S. nuclear energy sector has had to adjust to new supply chain constraints. While the waiver system provides flexibility, the industry has faced challenges in sourcing enriched uranium from alternative suppliers. Additionally, concerns have been raised about the potential for circumvention of the ban, particularly through third-party countries like China.

Top sources of enriched uranium for U.S. civilian nuclear power reactors in 2023
Country	Share (%)
United States	28%
Russia	27%
France	12%
Netherlands	8%
United Kingdom	7%
Germany	6%
Other	12%

=== Adjustments to the U.S. Nuclear Supply Chain ===
Since the law’s passage, the U.S. nuclear energy sector has had to navigate significant supply chain adjustments. U.S. utilities have increasingly turned to Western European and allied countries for enriched uranium, with European plants fulfilling around a third of enriched uranium needs in 2023, compared to 28% sourced domestically. According to the Energy Information Administration (EIA), the U.S. imports most of the enriched uranium it uses as fuel, a trend it has followed since 1992. Operators of U.S. civilian nuclear power reactors purchased 4,141 thousand separative work units from Russia in 2023, the agency suggests. U.S. enrichment plants only provided 4,313 thousand.

Though Russia had previously threatened to unilaterally halt uranium exports to the U.S., the Kremlin refrained from immediate action following the bill’s passage. Kremlin spokesman Dmitri S. Peskov described the legislation as “unfair” but did not reiterate the earlier threat. On November 15, in response to the ban, Russia retaliated by restricting uranium exports to the United States.

To enforce the ban and prevent circumvention, the Department of Energy has heightened its monitoring of uranium imports, focusing on potential re-exports from third-party countries. China, in particular, has come under scrutiny following a significant surge in uranium exports to the U.S. after the enactment of the legislation. This spike has raised suspicions that China may be acting as a conduit for Russian-enriched uranium, potentially re-exporting it under the guise of domestic production. U.S. officials point out that the timing and scale of these imports align with reduced direct exports from Russia, intensifying concerns over potential loopholes in the ban.

=== Domestic Uranium Enrichment Capacity ===
To mitigate supply chain disruptions and enhance energy security, the Act indirectly unlocked $2.7 billion in previously allocated federal funds to bolster domestic uranium enrichment industry. Centrus Energy, a leading U.S. firm engaged in uranium enrichment, has announced plans to expand its facilities and develop advanced technologies such as high-assay low-enriched uranium (HALEU). This more concentrated form of uranium is critical for next-generation reactors, including TerraPower’s Wyoming-based plant, which has experienced delays partly due to its commitment to exclude Russian uranium from its supply chain.

Historically, Centrus Energy has relied on Russian uranium to meet part of its demand. As such, the company received a waiver from the Department of Energy, allowing it to import low-enriched uranium from Russia for delivery to US customers in 2024 and 2025. Centrus' largest supplier of low-enriched uranium is Tenex, a Russian government-owned company. However, following the Russian response to the ban, Tenex notified Centrus that its general licence to export the material to the U.S. had been rescinded and that it is now required to obtain a specific export licence from the Russian authorities for each of its remaining 2024 shipments and for shipments in 2025.

Despite the urgency to rebuild domestic capacity, industry experts caution that creating a self-sufficient supply chain will take years. In the interim, waivers and other transitional measures will be critical to ensure the stability of the U.S. nuclear energy sector.
