= 2022 Russian debt default =

Credit crisis in Russia in 2022

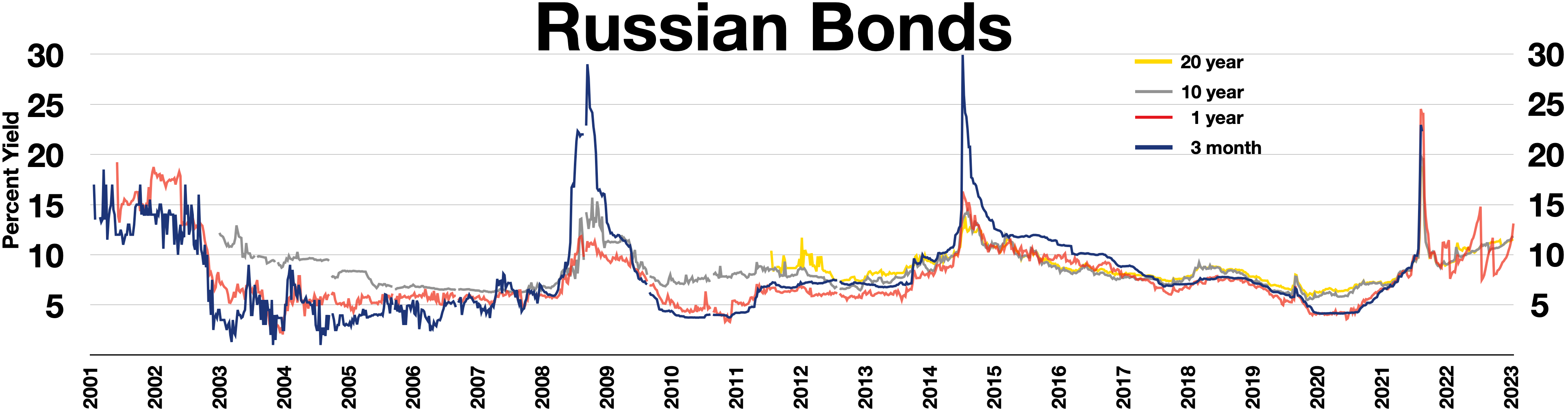
Russian bonds, Inverted yield curves to tame inflation during their wars (Russo-Georgian War, Russo-Ukrainian War, 2022 Russian invasion of Ukraine) 20 year bond 10 year bond 1 year bond 3 month bond

Russia defaulted on certain foreign currency denominated debt on 27 June 2022, because of sanctions and disrupted payment/clearing channels prevented bondholders from receiving funds. The event was widely described as Russia's first foreign sovereign debt default since 1918, though the country had defaulted on domestic ruble-denominated government debt in 1998. Before that, on 2 June, Russia defaulted on the 30-day interest, incorrectly not counting interest for the grace period, but a failure to pay $1.9 million was not sufficient to trigger a cross-default across other instruments, because the minimum threshold is an amount of at least $75 million, according to documents for other Russian eurobonds. The default occurred due to technicalities as the payment in dollars was impossible due to the sanctions by US and EU authorities, but did not mark an actual lack of capability to pay its debts.

== Background ==
The United States Treasury Department in February 2022 moved to cut off Russia from the global economy after the 2022 Russian invasion of Ukraine, announcing that it would immobilize Russian central bank assets that are held in the United States and impose sanctions on the Russian Direct Investment Fund. The $284 billion or more in frozen assets is nearly half of the $585 billion that Russia had stockpiled as of June 2021.

The Biden administration initially allowed Russia to continue to repurpose the substantial funds it has kept in U.S. financial institutions to make required payments on its sovereign debt. But on April 4, the Treasury Department banned Russia from withdrawing funds held in US banks to pay off its debt obligations.

On 4 April 2022, Russia technically defaulted on its foreign debt by failing to pay its obligations in US dollars (and after the grace period it actually defaulted because it did not pay 30 days grace period interest of around 1.9 million USD). On 8 April, the credit agency S&P Global predicted that Russia will inevitably be in "selective default on foreign currency obligations" (NR rating after CC rating) because it tried to pay obligations on dollar denominated debt in rubles, which could not be converted into "dollars equivalent to the originally due amounts", since every government can just "print money" in the currency it controls. A selective default occurs if a borrower defaults on specific (foreign, or more accurately, "foreign currency") obligations but not all of its debt.

Two dollar denominated bonds issued by the Russian government matured on 4 April 2022. On 5 April, Russia attempted to pay its bondholders with dollars from $600 million of reserves held in US banks, but these were blocked by the US as part of the sanctions against Russia for its invasion of Ukraine.

The Russian government had a 30-day grace period to meet its contractual obligations, but S&P Global stated that it expects that investors will not be able to convert rubles into “dollars equivalent to the originally due amounts” and sanctions will reduce Russia's "willingness and technical abilities to honor the terms and conditions" of the loans.

Previously, on 16 March, Russia managed to pay through a new method (acting on a general license issued by the US Office of Foreign Assets Control, which was valid until May 25) and thus avoided technical default, it also threatened to sue if forced into default or use cryptocurrency.

Earlier, Russian Minister of Finance Anton Siluanov said that Russia would repay its foreign currency debt only if its foreign currency accounts were unfrozen. On 29 April, Russia's Finance Ministry said that it made an attempt to repay US$649.2 million on Russia-2022 and Russia-2042 Eurobonds (in dollars through non-sanctioned Bank Dom.RF JSC to Bank of New York Mellon Corp. and then to Citibank N.A., London branch), but it was not clear if the payments would reach the recipients and Russia would avoid default. On 4 May, US and UK regulators cleared the payments with a technical date of 2 May.

Five days before the May 25 license expired, Russia again managed to pay on Russia-2026 and Russia-2036 Eurobonds but did not avoid falling into the grace period, because its money got stuck in Euroclear Bank (that was classified as an actual default by Moody's 30 days later on 27 June). It paid US$71.25 million for a dollar-denominated eurobond and 26.5 million euros ($28 million) for euro-denominated notes. The next payments after the due on 27 May one were $235 million across two Eurobonds due on June 23.

The 30-day grace period still required interest to be paid, so at the end of May the money paid on 29 April (and got into Citibank N.A. on 2 May) was about 1.9 million USD short, and the technical default from 4 April was converted into a real default, as recognized when 13 members of the Credit Derivatives Determinations Committee for Europe voted on 1 June, only one of them (Citibank N.A.) voting in favour of Russia.

A default for the purposes of CDS contracts "occurs once the determination committee votes for a credit event, which has now happened", said Gabriele Foa, portfolio manager of the Global Credit Opportunities Fund at Algebris. "Of course...it is a very small amount, so the definition of default is very technical. If, as it seems, it is not possible for foreign investors to receive dollars starting May 25, the default will soon be more material."

Finance Minister Anton Siluanov dismissed the default status as a "farce", since Russia has plenty of dollar and euro funds to repay the debt. Associated Press reported that the official default on Russian's foreign debt would take time to be confirmed. Financial analysts described Russia's situation as unique, since it has extensive amounts of cash to fulfill its debt obligations and very small foreign debt compared to USA.

== Russian default on foreign debt ==
On Monday 27 June 2022, Moody's rating agency declared that Russia defaulted on its foreign debt after missing a payment deadline the preceding Sunday.

== Post default events ==
In September 2023 a Russian USD denominated bond with a value of $3 billion became repayable. Repayment was made in rubles, with the Russian National Wealth Fund selling currencies to offset any bond owners who needed to sell their rubles, so supporting the ruble FX rate.

== See also ==
- 1998 Russian financial crisis
- 2022 Russia–European Union gas dispute – Fossil fuel financing-related conflicts
- Economic impact of the 2022 Russian invasion of Ukraine – Financial crisis beginning after the invasion of Ukraine and subsequent sanctions
- List of sovereign debt crises
- SWIFT ban against Russian banks – Sanction against Russia for the 2022 invasion of Ukraine
