= Jentleson =

Jentleson is a surname. Notable people with the surname include:

- Adam Jentleson (fl. 2003), former speechwriter for John Kerry, son of Bruce
- Bruce Jentleson (born 1951), Clinton administration foreign policy advisor and political science professor
