= Political positions of Joe Manchin =

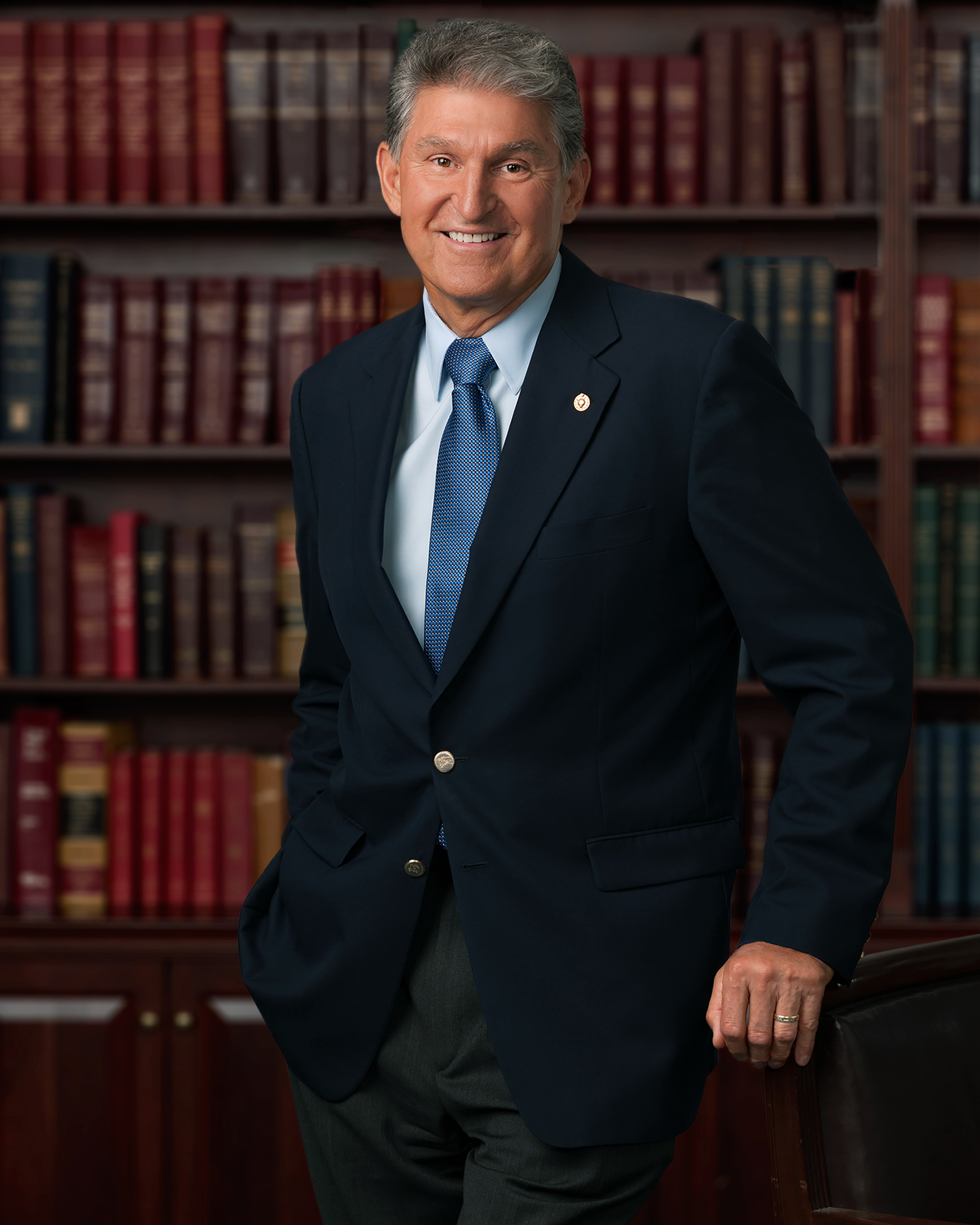
Joe Manchin during the 115th United States Congress

The political positions of Joe Manchin encompass the established political, social, cultural, and economic positions taken by Joe Manchin, a former United States senator from West Virginia. Manchin's positions are reflected in his voting records, public speeches, personal statements, and interviews. A member of the Democratic Party until 2024 when he registered as an independent, Manchin is characterized by his self-described moderate to conservative beliefs.

== Political philosophy ==
Manchin has been characterized as a moderate to conservative senator. His noted opposition to several Democratic Party positions have garnered him criticism from within the party, although he supported a majority of Democratic President Joe Biden's nominations and voted with him nearly 89% of the time. He has been referred to as a moderate Democrat by The Hill and Reuters. Politico and The Atlantic have labelled him as a conservative Democrat, a descriptor he himself has used.

Manchin's political philosophy is marked by bipartisanship. He has been described as a "blue dog", referring to a political philosophy of fiscally conservative Democrats that value working-class Americans. He was made an honorary co-chair of the centrist group No Labels.

On May 31, 2024, Manchin announced that he would leave the Democratic Party and file as an independent but would remain a member of the Senate Democratic Caucus. In the statement issued alongside his announcement filing as an independent, Manchin accused both the Republican and Democratic parties of "partisan extremism" and of "leaving West Virginia behind for partisan politics". He said that to "stay true to myself and remain committed to put country before party, I have decided to register as an independent with no party affiliation and continue to fight for America's sensible majority".

== Political positions ==
=== Abortion ===
Manchin was raised as "pro-life". On August 3, 2015, he broke with Democratic leadership by voting in favor of a Republican-sponsored bill to terminate federal funding for Planned Parenthood both in the United States and globally. He has received the endorsement of Democrats for Life of America, a Democratic PAC that opposes abortion.

On March 30, 2017, Manchin voted against H.J.Res. 43, which allowed states to refuse to give Title X grant money to organizations for reasons unrelated to their ability to provide the services needed. Trump signed the bill. In April 2017, Manchin endorsed the continued funding of Planned Parenthood. In January 2018, Manchin joined two other Democrats and most Republicans by voting for a bill to ban abortion after 20 weeks. In June 2018, upon Supreme Court Justice Anthony Kennedy's retirement, Manchin urged Trump not to appoint a judge who would seek to overturn Roe v. Wade but to instead choose a "centrist".

In 2019, Manchin was one of three Democrats to join all Republicans in voting for a bill to require that doctors care for infants born alive after a failed abortion.

In February 2022, Manchin was the only Democratic senator to vote against an abortion proposal, Women's Health Protection Act, that would have included limiting the states' ability to restrict abortion access, among other expansions.

In May 2022, Manchin said that he would again vote against his party's bill, the Women's Health Protection Act, which included codifying federal abortion rights as the Supreme Court appeared poised to overturn Roe. Manchin said the bill went too far and that he would support a narrower measure that still included codifying Roe. He was the only Senate Democrat to oppose the legislation.

Following Dobbs v. Jackson Women's Health Organization (2022), a landmark decision that held that the Constitution does not guarantee the right to an abortion and overturned Roe v. Wade (1973), Manchin expressed disappointment. He stated that Neil Gorsuch and Brett Kavanaugh, who helped deliver the majority opinion in Dobbs v. Jackson Women's Health Organization and whom he voted to confirm in 2017 and 2018, misled him. Although he expressed hope that Republicans would restore Roe v. Wade, he joined Republicans in opposing the Women's Health Protection Act.

=== Cryptocurrency ===
Manchin opposed cryptocurrency, particularly Bitcoin. With Schumer, he sought a crackdown on Bitcoin in June 2011. In February 2014, following the collapse of the cryptocurrency exchange Mt. Gox, he sent a letter to several economic figures—including then United States Department of the Treasury secretary Jack Lew, then Federal Reserve chair Janet Yellen, and then Securities and Exchange Commission chair Mary Jo White—asking for Bitcoin to be banned.

=== D.C. and Puerto Rico statehood ===
In a November 10, 2020, interview, Manchin said that he did not "see the need for the D.C. statehood with the type of services that we're getting in D.C. right now" and that he was "not convinced that's the way to go." Of Puerto Rico statehood, Manchin said that he opposed it but was open to discussion. In a January 10, 2021 interview, he did not affirm his opposition to statehood for D.C. or Puerto Rico, saying only, "I don't know enough about that yet. I want to see the pros and cons. So I'm waiting to see all the facts". On April 30, 2021, Manchin came out against the D.C. Statehood bill that had passed the House of Representatives, suggesting that D.C. could instead be given statehood by constitutional amendment.

=== Disaster relief ===
In May 2019, Manchin and John Cornyn introduced the Disaster Recovery Funding Act, a bill that would direct the Office of Management and Budget to release $16 billion for disaster relief funding within 60 days to nine states and two U.S. Territories. Manchin said that West Virginia had been awaiting funding for rebuilding for three years since a series of floods in June 2016. The bill died in committee.

In August 2019, Manchin announced $106 million in disaster relief funding for West Virginia.

=== Drugs ===
In June 2011, Manchin joined Senator Chuck Schumer (D-NY) in seeking a crackdown on Bitcoin currency transactions, saying that they facilitated illegal drug trade transactions. "The transactions leave no traditional bank transfer money trail for investigators to follow, and leave it hard to prove a package recipient knew in advance what was in a shipment," using an "'anonymizing network' known as Tor." One opinion website said the senators wanted "to disrupt the Silk Road drug website."

In May 2012, in an effort to reduce prescription drug abuse, Manchin successfully proposed an amendment to the Food and Drug Administration reauthorization bill to reclassify hydrocodone as a Schedule II controlled substance.

In 2018, Manchin secured a provision in the Opioid Crisis Response Act that ensured additional opioid funding for West Virginia after the bill had previously granted funding based on states' overall opioid overdose death counts as opposed to the overdose death rate. Manchin stated that the bill before his intervention was "basically using a blanket before when giving money" and added that the bill was incentivizing "companies to do the research to produce a product that gives the same relief as the opioid does, but is not (addictive)." The bill passed in the Senate in September.

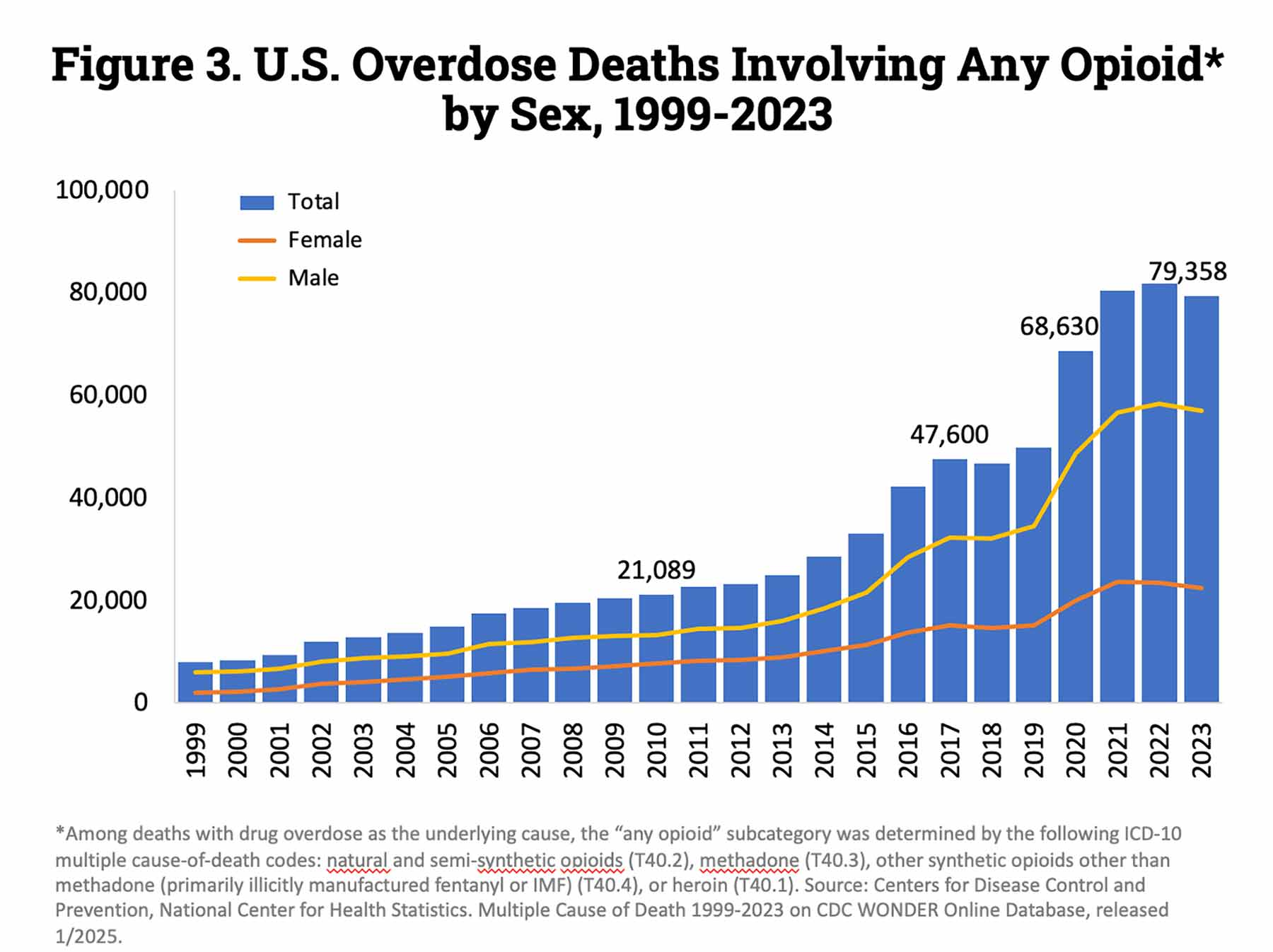
Number of yearly U.S. opioid overdose deaths from all opioid drugs

In April 2019, Manchin cosponsored the Protecting Jessica Grubb's Legacy Act, legislation that authorized medical records of patients being treated for substance use disorder being shared among healthcare providers in case the patient provided the information. Cosponsor Shelley Moore Capito stated that the bill also prevented medical providers from unintentionally providing opioids to individuals in recovery.

In May 2019, when Manchin and Capito announced $600,000 of funding for West Virginia through the Rural Communities Opioid Response Program of the Department of Health and Human Services' Health Resources and Services Administration, Manchin stated that the opioid epidemic had devastated every community in West Virginia and that as a senator "fighting against this horrible epidemic and helping fellow West Virginians have always been my top priorities."

In July 2019, Manchin issued a release in which he called for a $1.4 billion settlement from Reckitt Benckiser Group to be used for both programs and resources that would address the opioid epidemic.

=== Economics ===
In 2018, Manchin was one of 17 Democrats to break with their party and vote with Republicans to ease the Dodd-Frank banking rules.

Manchin opposed Trump's Tax Cuts and Jobs Act of 2017. He called it "a closed process" that "makes little impact in the paychecks of the people in his state." At the same time, he posited the bill contains "some good things ... Initially people will benefit," although ultimately voting against it. In turn, NRSC spokesman Bob Salera stated that he had "turned his back and voted with Washington Democrats."

Manchin opposed the January 2018 government shutdown. The New York Times suggested that he helped end the shutdown by threatening not to run for reelection unless his fellow Democrats ended it.

In March 2019, Manchin was a cosponsor of a bipartisan bill to undo a drafting error in the Tax Cuts and Jobs Act that mandated stores and restaurants to have to write off the costs of renovations over the course of 39 years via authorizing businesses to immediately deduct the entirety of costs of renovations.

On February 2, 2021, Manchin announced his opposition to an increase from $7.25 to $15 per hour in the federal minimum wage, but said he was open to a smaller increase, perhaps to $11, and higher for parts of the country with a higher cost of living, like Massachusetts, New York, and California. He also argued that the minimum wage should be index-linked, saying, "Once it gets above $11 it should be indexed, so it never becomes a political football again." Along with seven other Democrats, Manchin opposed a $15 minimum wage proposal by Bernie Sanders as part of the American Rescue Plan Act of 2021 and forced Democrats to limit extended unemployment benefits in the same bill.

By contrast, on April 19, 2021, Manchin telegraphed support for the Protecting the Right to Organize Act, which would dissolve state right-to-work laws, strengthen the right to organize and strike, and impose tougher restrictions on companies seeking to prevent unionization efforts.

=== Education ===
In February 2019, Manchin said the collapse of an omnibus education reform proposal resulted from state lawmakers not laying the groundwork for broad support for the proposal. Manchin said, "You don't do major reform, policy changes, for the whole education system in a 60-day session without public hearings. There should have been a whole year of going out and speaking to the public." He stated his support for homeschooling and private schools as well as his opposition to funding "them with public dollars."

=== Energy and environment ===
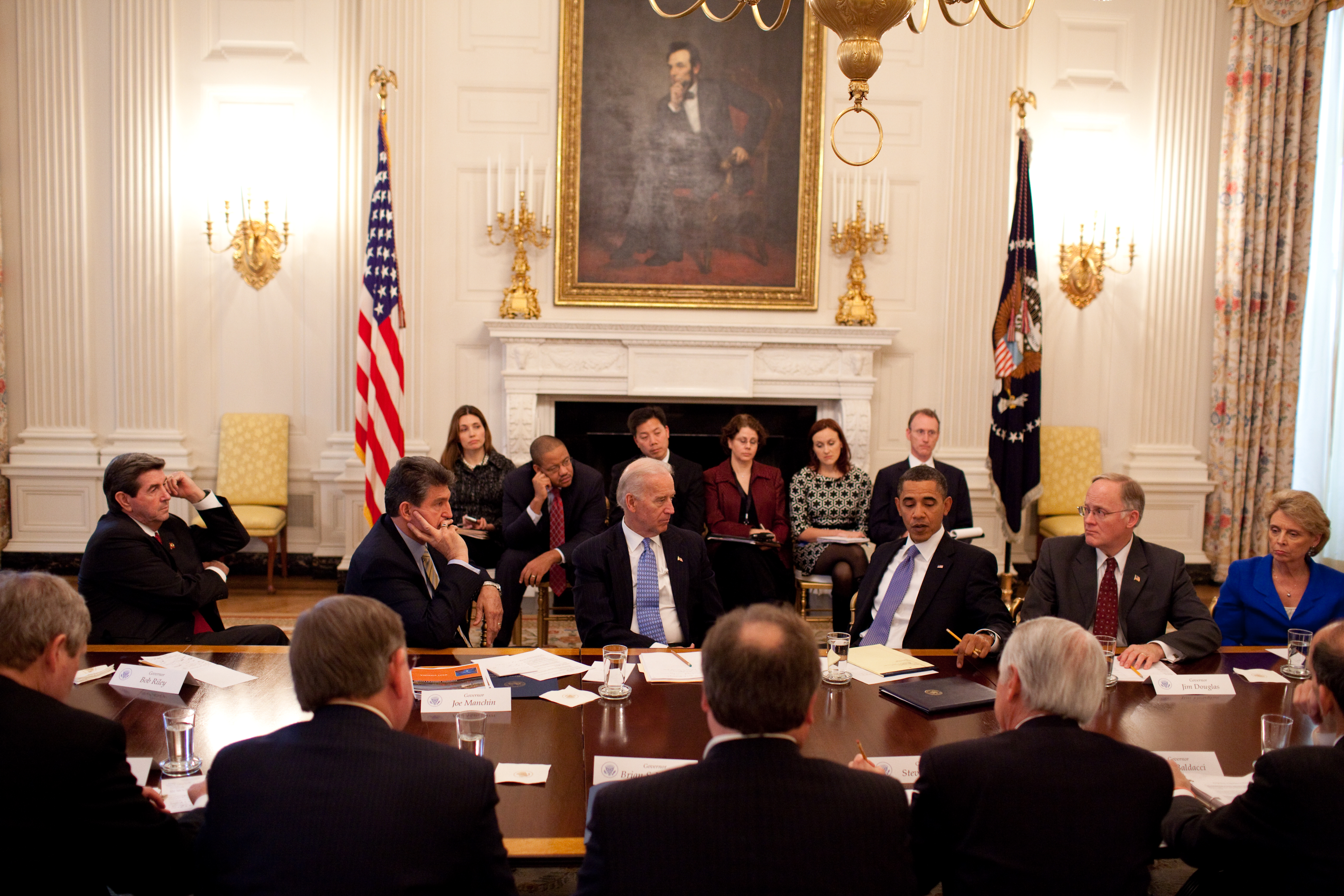
President Barack Obama and then-Vice President Joe Biden speak to a bipartisan group of governors about building a clean energy economy, February 2010

Manchin sat on the Senate Energy and Natural Resources Committee and supported a comprehensive, "all-of-the-above" energy approach that includes coal.

Manchin's first bill in the Senate dealt with what he called the EPA's overreach. After the EPA vetoed a previously approved permit for the Spruce Mine in Logan County, West Virginia, he offered the EPA Fair Play Act, which would "clarify and confirm the authority of the Environment Protection Agency to deny or restrict the use of defined areas as disposal sites for the discharge of dredged or filled material". Manchin said the bill would prevent the EPA from "changing its rules on businesses after permits have already been granted."

Environmentalists have criticized Manchin for his family ties to the coal industry. He served as president of Energysystems in the late 1990s before becoming active in politics. On his financial disclosures in 2009 and 2010, his reported earnings from the company were $1,363,916 and $417,255, respectively. Critics have said his opposition to health regulations that would raise industry expenses is due to his stake in the industry; West Virginia's Sierra Club chapter chair Jim Sconyers said, "he's been nothing but a mouthpiece for the coal industry his whole public life." Opinions on the subject are mixed; The Charleston Gazette wrote, "the prospect that Manchin's $1.7 million-plus in recent Enersystems earnings might tilt him even more strongly pro-coal might seem remote, given the deep economic and cultural connections that the industry maintains in West Virginia."

Manchin supported building the Keystone XL Pipeline from Canada. He has said, "It makes so much common sense that you want to buy oil off your friends and not your enemies." The pipeline would span over 2,000 miles across the United States.

In 2011, Manchin was the only Democratic senator to support the Energy Tax Prevention Act, which sought to prohibit the EPA from regulating greenhouse gas. In 2012, Manchin supported a failed GOP effort to "scuttle Environmental Protection Agency regulations that mandate cuts in mercury pollution and other toxic emissions from coal-fired power plants", while West Virginia's other senator, Jay Rockefeller, did not.

In December 2014, Manchin was one of six Democratic senators to sign a letter to the EPA urging it to give states more time to comply with its rule on power plants and calling for an elimination of the 2020 targets in the final rule.

Manchin criticized President Barack Obama's environmental regulations as a "war on coal" and demanded what he called a proper balance between the needs of the environment and the coal business. The Los Angeles Times wrote that while professing environmental concerns, he has consistently stood up for coal, adding, "no one is going to stop using fossil fuels for a long time." Manchin "does not deny the existence of man-made climate change", the Times wrote, but "is reluctant to curtail it." In February 2017, he was one of two Democratic senators to vote to confirm Scott Pruitt as Administrator of the Environmental Protection Agency.

In June 2017, Manchin supported President Donald Trump's withdrawal from the Paris climate accord, saying he supported "a cleaner energy future" but that the Paris deal failed to strike "a balance between our environment and the economy."

In April 2019, Manchin was one of three Democratic senators who voted with Republicans to confirm David Bernhardt, an oil executive, as Secretary of the Interior.

In February 2019, after Republican Senate Majority Leader Mitch McConnell called for a vote on the Green New Deal in order to get Democratic members of the Senate on record regarding the legislation, Manchin expressed opposition to the plan:

The Green New Deal is a dream, it's not a deal. It's a dream. And that's fine. People should have dreams in the perfect world what they'd like to see. I've got to work in realities and I've got to work in the practical, what I have in front of me. I've got to make sure that our country has affordable, dependable, reliable energy 24/7, but you can't just be a denier and say, "Well, I'm not going to use coal. I'm not going to use natural gas. I'm not going to use oil."

In 2021, Manchin opposed the "Clean Electricity Performance Program" in a budget reconciliation bill, leading to its removal from that bill.

In October 2021, The Guardian named Manchin one of the United States' top "climate villains", writing that he "uses his position to hold climate legislation hostage on behalf of the fossil fuel industry".

As part of the Inflation Reduction Act, consumers who purchase electric vehicles are eligible for a federal tax credit, despite Manchin describing such credits as "ludicrous". In January 2023, the Internal Revenue Service (IRS) delayed implementing the tax credit to determine how to enforce the guidance in the Inflation Reduction Act. In response, Manchin introduced a bill to halt the credit until battery requirements can be introduced; the bill would also rescind some credits. He vowed to sue the Biden administration in March.

=== Federal budget ===
Manchin has co-sponsored balanced budget amendments put forth by Senators Mike Lee (R-UT), Richard Shelby (R-AL), and Mark Udall (D-CO). He has also voted against raising the federal debt ceiling.

Manchin has expressed strong opposition to entitlement reform, describing Mitch McConnell's comments in October 2018 on the need to reform entitlement programs such as Social Security, Medicaid and Medicare as "absolutely ridiculous." In January 2019, Manchin supported both Republican and Democratic bills to end a government shutdown. He was the only Democrat to break from his party and vote in favor of the Republican proposal.

On August 1, 2019, the Senate passed a bipartisan budget deal that raised spending over current levels by $320 billion and lifted the debt ceiling for the following two years in addition to forming a course for funding the government without the perceived fiscal brinkmanship of recent years. Manchin joined Tom Carper and Republicans Mitt Romney and Rick Scott in issuing a statement asserting that "as former Governors, we were responsible for setting a budget each year that was fiscally responsible to fund our priorities. That's why today, we, as U.S. Senators, cannot bring ourselves to vote for this budget deal that does not put our country on a fiscally sustainable path."

=== Foreign policy ===
Manchin criticized American military intervention overseas, particularly in Afghanistan and Syria. He repeatedly demanded the withdrawal of American troops from Afghanistan and opposed most military intervention in Syria.

On June 21, 2011, Manchin delivered a speech on the Senate floor calling for a "substantial and responsible reduction in the United States' military presence in Afghanistan." He said, "We can no longer afford to rebuild Afghanistan and America. We must choose. And I choose America." Manchin's remarks were criticized by Senator John McCain (R-AZ) as "at least uninformed about history and strategy and the challenges we face from radical Islamic extremism." Manchin made similar remarks in a press conference on January 7, 2014, arguing that "all of the money and all of the military might in the world will not change that part of the world." He said that by the end of the year, the American troops in that country should be at Bagram Airfield alone. After the deaths of three American soldiers in Afghanistan in November 2018, Manchin renewed his calls for the withdraw of American troops from the country, saying that both presidents Obama and Trump had expressed support for taking troops out of the country but had not done so. "They all seem to have the rhetoric, and no one seems to have the follow-up. It's time to come out of there," he said.

Manchin introduced legislation to reduce the use of overseas service and security contractors. He successfully amended the 2013 National Defense Authorization Act to cap contractors' taxpayer-funded salaries at $230,000.

Following the Ghouta chemical attack in August 2013 during the Syrian Civil War, Manchin said, "There is no doubt that an attack occurred and there is no doubt it was produced under the Assad regime. It's not clear cut if Assad gave the order himself. It has not been proven." He opposed any strikes on the Syrian Government in retaliation for the attacks. Instead, he introduced a joint resolution with Senator Heidi Heitkamp (D-ND) requesting that President Obama come up with a long-term strategy on Syria and work diplomatically to ensure the destruction of Syria's chemical weapons. On September 16, 2014, Manchin announced that he would vote against a possible Senate resolution to arm Syrian opposition fighters. "At the end of the day, most of the arms that we give to people are used against us. Most of the people we train turn against us," he said. He referred to plans calling for ground troops in Syria, which had been proposed by some Republican senators, including Lindsey Graham of South Carolina, as "insanity," but supported the 2017 Shayrat missile strike launched by order of President Trump in response to a chemical weapons attack allegedly perpetrated by the Syrian Government. Manchin said that "yesterday's strike was important to send a message to the Syrian regime and their Russian enablers that these horrific actions will not be tolerated."

In April 2017, Manchin was one of eight Democratic senators to sign a letter to President Trump noting government-subsidized Chinese steel had been placed into the American market in recent years below cost and had hurt the domestic steel industry and the iron ore industry that fed it, calling on Trump to raise the steel issue with General Secretary of the Chinese Communist Party Xi Jinping in his meeting with him.

In April 2017, following a North Korea senior official declaring that the U.S. had created "a dangerous situation in which a thermonuclear war may break out at any minute," Manchin stated that North Korea had "to understand that we will retaliate" and that he did not believe the U.S. would not respond if North Korea continued to play "their games." In May 2018, Manchin accused Kim Jong-un of accelerating "the nuclear threat" of North Korea in a manner that would enable him to receive concessions and that Kim Jong-un was "in a serious, serious problem with his country and the people in his country" without China.

In June 2017, Manchin was one of five Democrats who, by voting against a Senate resolution disapproving of arms sales to Saudi Arabia, ensured its failure. Potential primary opponent Paula Jean Swearengin charged that because of Manchin's vote, weapons sold to the Saudis "could possibly end up in the hands of terrorists."

In June 2017, Manchin co-sponsored the Israel Anti-Boycott Act (S.270), which made it a federal crime, punishable by a maximum sentence of 20 years imprisonment, for Americans to encourage or participate in boycotts against Israel and Israeli settlements in the occupied Palestinian territories if protesting actions by the Israeli government.

In July 2017, Manchin urged Trump to block the sale of the Chicago Stock Exchange to Chinese investors, arguing that China's "rejection of fundamental free-market norms and property rights of private citizens makes me strongly doubt whether an Exchange operating under the direct control of a Chinese entity can be trusted to 'self-regulate' now and in the future." He also expressed concern "that the challenges plaguing the Chinese market—lack of transparency, currency manipulation, etc.—will bleed into the Chicago Stock Exchange and adversely impact financial markets across the country."

In November 2017, in response to efforts by China to purchase tech companies based in the U.S., Manchin was one of nine senators to cosponsor a bill that would broaden the federal government's ability to prevent foreign purchases of U.S. firms by increasing the strength of the Committee on Foreign Investment in the United States (CFIUS). The scope of the CFIUS would be expanded to allow it to review and possibly decline smaller investments, and add national security factors for CFIUS to consider, including whether information about Americans would be exposed as part of transactions or whether a deal would facilitate fraud.

In November 2017, after the West Virginia Commerce Department announced an agreement with China Energy to invest $83.7 billion in shale gas development and chemical manufacturing projects in West Virginia after state Commerce Secretary Woody Thrasher and China Energy President Ling Wen signed a memorandum of understanding, Manchin said that he was thrilled with the signing and that he was satisfied that China Energy recognized West Virginians as the hardest-working people in the world.

In March 2018, Manchin blamed China for Trump's imposition of tariffs on steel and aluminum imports, noting that the U.S. was the largest importer of steel while 50% of steel was produced in China, and that he believed that prices would increase as a result of the tariffs.

In 2019, Manchin and Republican Marco Rubio drafted a Middle East policy bill with provisions that rebuked President Trump over withdrawals of troops from Syria and Afghanistan and a measure authorizing state and municipal governments to punish companies after they oppose Israel via boycott, divestment or sanctions. The measure also reauthorized at least $3.3 billion for Israel's military financing in addition to extending Jordan's security aid, granting new sanctions on individuals giving their support to the Syrian government and ordering the Treasury Department to determine whether the Central Bank of Syria was money laundering. The bill passed in the Senate in a 77 to 23 vote in February 2019.

On January 8, 2019, Manchin was one of four Democrats to vote to advance a bill imposing sanctions against the Syrian government and furthering U.S. support for Israel and Jordan as Democratic members of the chamber employed tactics to end the United States federal government shutdown of 2018–2019. In April 2019, he endorsed Republican senator Susan Collins in her 2020 reelection campaign.

In May 2019, Manchin cosponsored the South China Sea and East China Sea Sanctions Act, a bipartisan bill reintroduced by Marco Rubio and Ben Cardin that was intended to disrupt China's consolidation or expansion of its claims of jurisdiction over both the sea and air space in disputed zones in the South China Sea.

In October 2019, Manchin was one of six senators to sign a bipartisan letter to Trump calling on him to "urge Turkey to end their offensive and find a way to a peaceful resolution while supporting our Kurdish partners to ensure regional stability" and arguing that to leave Syria without installing protections for American allies would endanger both them and the US.

In March 2022, during the Russian invasion of Ukraine, Manchin and Murkowski led the drafting of the Ban Russian Energy Imports Act. The act would declare a national emergency pursuant to existing law and ban most fossil fuel imports from Russia for the war's duration. At introduction it was sponsored by 18 senators, a mixture of Republicans, Democrats, and independents.

=== Guns ===
Following the Sandy Hook shooting, Manchin partnered with Republican senator Pat Toomey to introduce a bill that would have strengthened background checks on gun sales. The Manchin-Toomey bill was defeated on April 17, 2013, by a vote of 54–46; 60 votes would have been required to pass it. Despite the fact that the bill did not pass, the NRA targeted Manchin in an attack ad.

In 2016, referring to the difficulty of keeping guns out of the hands of potential terrorists in the aftermath of the Orlando nightclub shooting, Manchin said, "due process is what's killing us right now." This comment drew the criticism of both the NRA and the Cato Institute, which accused Manchin of attacking a fundamental constitutional principle. "With all respect," commented Ilya Shapiro of Cato, "due process is the essential basis of America."

In October 2017, following the Las Vegas shooting, Manchin stated that it was "going to take President Trump, who looks at something from a law-abiding gun owner's standpoint, that makes common sense and gun sense" for progress to be made on gun legislation and that he would not rule out reviving the Manchin-Toomey bill if the legislation attracted enough Republican cosponsors.

In a March 2018 interview, a month after the Stoneman Douglas High School shooting and shortly before the March For Our Lives demonstrations, Manchin stated that the Manchin-Toomey bill should serve as the base for a new gun control law and that Trump expressing support for background checks would set his legacy and "give Republicans enough cover to support this in the most reasonable, responsible way."

In August 2019, following two more mass shootings in El Paso, Texas, and Dayton, Ohio, Manchin said that Trump had "a golden opportunity to start making America safe again by starting with this basic building block of background checks." Manchin also noted his disagreement with the position of House Minority Whip Steve Scalise that existing gun background check measures were sufficient, adding that even though he was "a law-abiding gun owner," he would not sell a gun through a gun show or online to someone whose history he was unsure of. On September 5 of that year, Manchin and Trump met in the White House for a discussion on gun-control legislation. According to a White House official, Trump told Manchin of his "interest in getting a result" so dialogue could resume "to see if there's a way to create a reasonable background check proposal, along with other ideas."

=== Health care ===
In 2010, Manchin called for "repairs" of the Affordable Care Act and repeal of the "bad parts of Obamacare." On January 14, 2017, Manchin expressed concern at the strict party-line vote on repealing Obamacare and said he could not, in good conscience, vote to repeal without a new plan in place. He added, however, that he was willing to work with Trump and the GOP to formulate a replacement. In June 2017, Manchin and Bob Casey Jr. of Pennsylvania warned that repealing Obamacare would worsen the opioid crisis. In July 2017, he said that he was one of about ten senators from both parties who had been "working together behind the scenes" to formulate a new health-care program, but that there was otherwise insufficient bipartisanship on the issue.

In September 2017, Manchin released a statement expressing that he was skeptical of a single-payer health care system being "the right solution" while noting his support for the Senate considering "all of the options through regular order so that we can fully understand the impacts of these ideas on both our people and our economy."

During 2016–2017, Manchin read to the Senate several letters from constituents about loved ones' deaths from opioids and urged his colleagues to act to prevent more deaths. Manchin took "an unusual proposal" to President Trump to address the crisis and called for a "war on drugs" that involves not punishment but treatment. He proposed the LifeBOAT Act, which would fund treatment. He also opposes marijuana legalization. In January 2018, Manchin was one of six Democrats who broke with their party to vote to confirm Trump's nominee for Health Secretary, Alex Azar.

In his 2018 reelection campaign, Manchin emphasized his support for Obamacare, running an ad where he criticized a lawsuit that sought to repeal the Affordable Care Act.

In January 2019, Manchin was one of six Democratic senators to introduce the American Miners Act of 2019, a bill that would amend the Surface Mining Control and Reclamation Act of 1977 to swap funds in excess of the amounts needed to meet existing obligations under the Abandoned Mine Land fund to the 1974 Pension Plan as part of an effort to prevent its insolvency as a result of coal company bankruptcies and the 2008 financial crisis. It also increased the Black Lung Disability Trust Fund tax and ensured that miners affected by the 2018 coal company bankruptcies would not lose their health care.

In a May 2019 letter to Attorney General William Barr, Manchin and Republican Susan Collins wrote that the Affordable Care Act "is quite simply the law of the land, and it is the Administration's and your Department's duty to defend it" and asserted that Congress could "work together to fix legislatively the parts of the law that aren't working" without letting the position of a federal court "stand and devastate millions of seniors, young adults, women, children and working families."

=== Immigration ===
Manchin opposed the DREAM Act and was absent from a 2010 vote on the bill. He supports construction of a wall along the southern border of the United States. He opposed the Obama administration's lawsuit against Arizona over that state's immigration enforcement law. Manchin voted against the McCain-Coons proposal to create a pathway to citizenship for some undocumented immigrants without funding for a border wall and he voted against a comprehensive immigration bill proposed by Susan Collins which gave a pathway to citizenship for Dreamers as well as funding for border security.

Manchin voted to withhold funding for "sanctuary cities" and in support of President Trump's proposal to give a pathway to citizenship for Dreamers, build a border wall, and reduce legal immigration. On June 18, 2018, he came out against the Trump administration family separation policy. In September 2019, Manchin was the only Democrat on the Senate Appropriations panel to vote for a $71 billion homeland security measure that granted Trump the $5 billion he had previously requested to build roughly 200 miles of fencing along the U.S.-Mexico border.

=== Infrastructure ===
In 2021, in response to a leaked story stating that the Biden administration would pursue a $3 trillion infrastructure package, Manchin appeared to support the spending; he called for an "enormous" infrastructure bill. He also expressed openness to paying for the bill by raising taxes on corporations and wealthy people, despite the fact that this would likely eliminate any possible bipartisan support.

In December 2021, however, Manchin signaled that he was not likely to vote for the Biden-supported Build Back Better Act, saying, "I cannot vote to continue with this piece of legislation. I just can't. I've tried everything humanly possible. I can't get there." Manchin named growing inflation, the national debt, and the Omicron variant of the SARS-CoV-2 virus as reasons for opposition. White House Press Secretary Jen Psaki criticized Manchin for taking this position and the United Mine Workers of America (UMWA) urged him to reconsider it.

Negotiations between Manchin and Senate Majority Leader Chuck Schumer eventually resulted in the Inflation Reduction Act of 2022, which incorporated some of the Build Back Better Act's climate change, healthcare, and tax reform proposals while excluding its social safety net proposals. Manchin expressed his support for the Inflation Reduction Act on July 27, 2022. On August 7, 2022, the Senate passed the Inflation Reduction Act on a 51–50 vote, with Manchin voting in favor and Vice President Kamala Harris breaking a tie. On August 16, 2022, President Joe Biden signed the Act into law.

As part of the Inflation Reduction Act, consumers who purchase electric vehicles are eligible for a federal tax credit, despite Manchin describing such credits as "ludicrous". In January 2023, the Internal Revenue Service (IRS) delayed implementing the tax credit to determine how to enforce the guidance in the Inflation Reduction Act. In response, Manchin introduced a bill to halt the credit until battery requirements can be introduced; the bill would also rescind some credits. In February 2023, Politico reported that Manchin was "livid" over how the Biden administration was implementing the Inflation Reduction Act. He was especially concerned about the delay in implementing the tax credits. In March 2023, he vowed to sue the Biden administration over this issue.

In July 2024, Manchin and John Barrasso introduced S. 4753, the Energy Permitting Reform Act of 2024, aiming to speed the permitting process for energy infrastructure and mineral development. The bill would affect both fossil fuel and electric power transmission projects.

In December 2024, Manchin revealed that he supported the Inflation Reduction Act only after the Russian invasion of Ukraine, because of the 2021-2023 global energy crisis.

=== LGBT rights ===
On December 9, 2010, Manchin was the sole Democrat to vote against cloture for the 2011 National Defense Authorization Act, which contained a provision to repeal Don't Ask, Don't Tell. In an interview with the Associated Press, Manchin cited the advice of retired military chaplains as a basis for his decision to vote against repeal. He also indicated he wanted more time to "hear the full range of viewpoints from the citizens of West Virginia." A day later, he was publicly criticized at a gay rights rally for his position on the bill. On July 26, 2017, he voiced opposition to Trump's proposed ban on transgender service in the United States military.

As of 2015, Manchin was the only member of the Senate Democratic Caucus to oppose same-sex marriage. On February 14, 2018, he cosponsored S.515, a bill that would amend the Internal Revenue Code of 1986 to clarify that all provisions shall apply to legally married same-sex couples in the same manner as other married couples. As of March 18, 2019, he is the only member of the Senate Democratic Caucus who is not a cosponsor of the Equality Act. He has said that he believes "no one should be afraid of losing their job or losing their housing because of their sexual orientation" but does not believe the current version of the Equality Act "provides sufficient guidance to the local officials who will be responsible for implementing it." In November 2022, Manchin reversed his prior position and voted to advance and pass legislation, the Respect for Marriage Act, which protects same-sex marriages under federal law.

In March 2021, Manchin was the only Democrat to vote for a failed amendment to rescind funding from public schools that allow transgender youth to participate in the sporting teams of their gender identity.

=== Party affiliation ===
Before his Senate swearing-in in 2010, rumors suggested that the Republican Party was courting Manchin to change parties. Republicans later suggested that Manchin was the source of the rumors. As the 2016 elections approached, reports speculated that Manchin would become a Republican if the Senate were in a 50–50 tie, but he later said he would remain a Democrat at least as long as he remained in the Senate. In 2018, Manchin said that he became and remained a Democrat because everyone that he knew growing up in Farmington, West Virginia was a Democrat during the New Deal era.

In late 2021, several Republicans urged Manchin to join the Republican Party. During appearances on Fox News, Republicans Jim Justice, Jeff Van Drew, Bill Hagerty, and Tom Cotton each suggested that Manchin join their party. Senators Ted Cruz and John Cornyn also said that they had attempted to convince Manchin to do so. Then-Senate Minority Leader Mitch McConnell stated that he had attempted to recruit Manchin into the Republican Party for years.

In 2022, Donald Trump wrote in a Truth Social post: "The fact is, Joe Manchin should have been brought into the Republican Party long ago".

=== Senior citizens ===
To help locate missing senior citizens, Manchin introduced the Silver Alert Act in July 2011 to create a nationwide network for locating missing adults and senior citizens modeled after the Amber alert. Manchin also sponsored the National Yellow Dot Act to create a voluntary program that would alert emergency services personnel responding to car accidents of the availability of personal and medical information on the car's owner.

Manchin said in 2014 that he "would change Social Security completely. I would do it on an inflationary basis, as far as paying into payroll taxes, and change that, to keep us stabilized as far as cash flow. I'd do COLAs—I'd talk about COLA for 250 percent of poverty guidelines." Asked whether this meant he would "cut benefits to old people," Manchin said that "a rich old person ... won't get the COLAs." He asked: "Do you want chained CPI? I can live with either one."

=== Technology ===
In December 2018, after the Federal Communications Commission (FCC) announced a pause on the funding program for wireless broadband during its conduct of an investigation, Manchin announced his intent to hold the renomination of Brendan Carr in protest of the move. Manchin lifted his hold the following week after the FCC promised that it would make funding for wireless broadband in rural areas a priority.

In August 2019, Manchin sent FCC Chairman Ajit Pai eight letters that contained results from speed tests across West Virginia as part of an effort to highlight incorrect broadband coverage maps in the state.

Manchin revived the See Something, Say Something Online Act with senator John Cornyn in January 2021, an act he previously sponsored in August 2021, to require online platforms to report illegal activities—such as the sale of opioids—to law enforcement, weakening the power of Section 230 of the Communications Decency Act. Manchin opposed Biden's nomination of Gigi Sohn as the FCC's commissioner citing her association with "far-left groups", in apparent reference to her work with the Electronic Frontier Foundation.

=== Veterans ===
In February 2017, Manchin and Roy Blunt introduced the HIRE Veterans Act, which establishes a tiered recognition program within the Department of Labor to award employers based on their contributions to veteran employment. The legislation passed in April 2017.

In January 2019, Manchin was one of five senators to cosponsor the VA Provider Accountability Act, a bipartisan bill meant to amend Title 38 of the United States Code to authorize the under secretary of health to report "major adverse personnel actions" related to certain health care employees at the National Practitioner Data Bank along with applicable state licensing boards.

In July 2019, Manchin and Republican Marsha Blackburn introduced the Providing Veterans Access to In-State Tuition Act, a bill that would remove a three-year post-discharge requirement and thereby enable student veterans eligibility to receive in-state tuition rates from public schools in the event they decide to use their Post 9/11 GI Bill benefits.

In August 2019, Manchin and Capito announced a collection of grants that totaled to over $7 million intended to aid homeless veterans under the U.S. Department of Veterans Affairs' (VA) Supportive Services for Veteran Families (SSVF) Program.

=== Voting rights ===
On June 6, 2021, in an op-ed published in the Charleston Gazette-Mail, Manchin expressed his opposition to the For the People Act due to its lack of bipartisan support. But he has expressed his support for a reinforced version of the John Lewis Voting Rights Act and urged its passage in the Senate. Shortly thereafter, several Democratic lawmakers accused Manchin of supporting Jim Crow laws by opposing the For the People Act, a signature piece of legislation of the Democratic majority, aiming to expand voting rights, among other provisions.

The bill has universal Republican opposition, and so would require the filibuster to be eliminated in order to pass. Manchin defended his opposition to it, saying, "I think there's a lot of great things in that piece of legislation, but there's an awful lot of things that basically don't pertain directly to voting." In the op-ed, he also elaborated on his view of eliminating the filibuster: "I cannot explain strictly partisan election reform or blowing up the Senate rules to expedite one party's agenda."
