= Varo =

Varo may refer to:

== People ==
- Alberto Varo (born 1993), Spanish footballer
- Francisco Varo (1627–1687), Spanish Dominican friar, missionary in China, linguist
- Gala Varo, Mexican drag queen
- Márton Váró (born 1943), Hungarian sculptor
- Remedios Varo (1908–1963), Spanish surrealist artist
- Varo Venturi (born 1956), Italian film director and musician

== Places ==
- Varo Island, Vanuatu
- Var River, in France

== Other uses ==
- Varo Bank, an American neobank

== See also ==
- Varro, a fictional species from the Star Trek: Voyager series featured in episode The Disease
