= Bipartisan American Affordability and Jobs Act of 2026 =

Proposed 2026 United States federal permitting streamlining law

- Long title: To prescribe permitting reform, and for other purposes.
- Acronyms (colloquial): BAAJA
- Announced in: the 119th United States Congress

Codification
- Acts amended: National Environmental Policy Act, Clean Water Act, National Historic Preservation Act, Endangered Species Act, Federal Power Act

Legislative history
- Introduced in the Senate as S. 5653 by Shelley Moore Capito on September 30, 2026; Committee consideration by Senate Energy and Natural Resources

The Bipartisan American Affordability and Jobs Act (BAAJA) is a proposed 2026 federal law intended to expedite projects by changing permitting laws like the National Historic Preservation Act and the National Environmental Policy Act. It was introduced by Shelley Moore Capito (R-WV), Mike Lee (R-UT), Martin Heinrich (D-NM), and Sheldon Whitehouse (D-RI).

== Background ==
Congestion in the electrical grid has increased, driven in part by the AI boom and new renewable projects routinely expect queue delays of four to nine years before connecting to the grid. NEPA delays can sink projects and lengthen transmission timelines. Specifically, the emission reduction effects of the Inflation Reduction Act were strongly dependent on transmission buildout which was limited by the speed of permitting.

Both Democratic and Republican administrations have used executive action to impede projects, creating uncertainty: the Biden administration's revocation of the Keystone XL pipeline by executive order, and the Trump administration's attempt to stop already-permitted offshore wind projects.

== Previous legislation ==
Both parties have attempted permitting reform several times since 2022. As part of a deal for his support of the Inflation Reduction Act, Senator Joe Manchin proposed the Building American Energy Security Act (S. 1399), which would have capped NEPA timelines, expanded categorical exclusions, and given FERC interstate permitting authority over electrical transmission and hydrogen gas pipelines. It was offered as an amendment to the National Defense Authorization Act for Fiscal Year 2023, but failed to pass; a significant sticking point was Manchin's support for the Mountain Valley Pipeline.

In 2023, the newly-Republican House passed H.R. 1, the Lower Energy Costs Act, which put timelines on NEPA actions, mandated federal oil and gas leases, and repealed a number of IRA provisions. It was immediately stalled in the Democratically-controlled Senate. Later that year, the Fiscal Responsibility Act of 2023, which passed, included some NEPA timelines as well as approving the Mountain Valley Pipeline.

In summer and fall of 2024, the Energy Permitting Reform Act of 2024, supported by Joe Manchin and John Barrasso, which would have combined speedier fossil-fuel permitting with national electrical grid planning, made it through committee, but was not taken up by the Senate floor. Lastly, in December 2025, the SPEED Act (H.R. 4776) placed timelines on NEPA and limited remedies, and was passed by the House, but was not taken up by the Senate, which insisted that any deal include interregional electric transmission planning, cost allocation for data centers, and permit certainty. These negotiations led to BAAJA.

== Legislative history ==
Primary BAAJA Sponsors

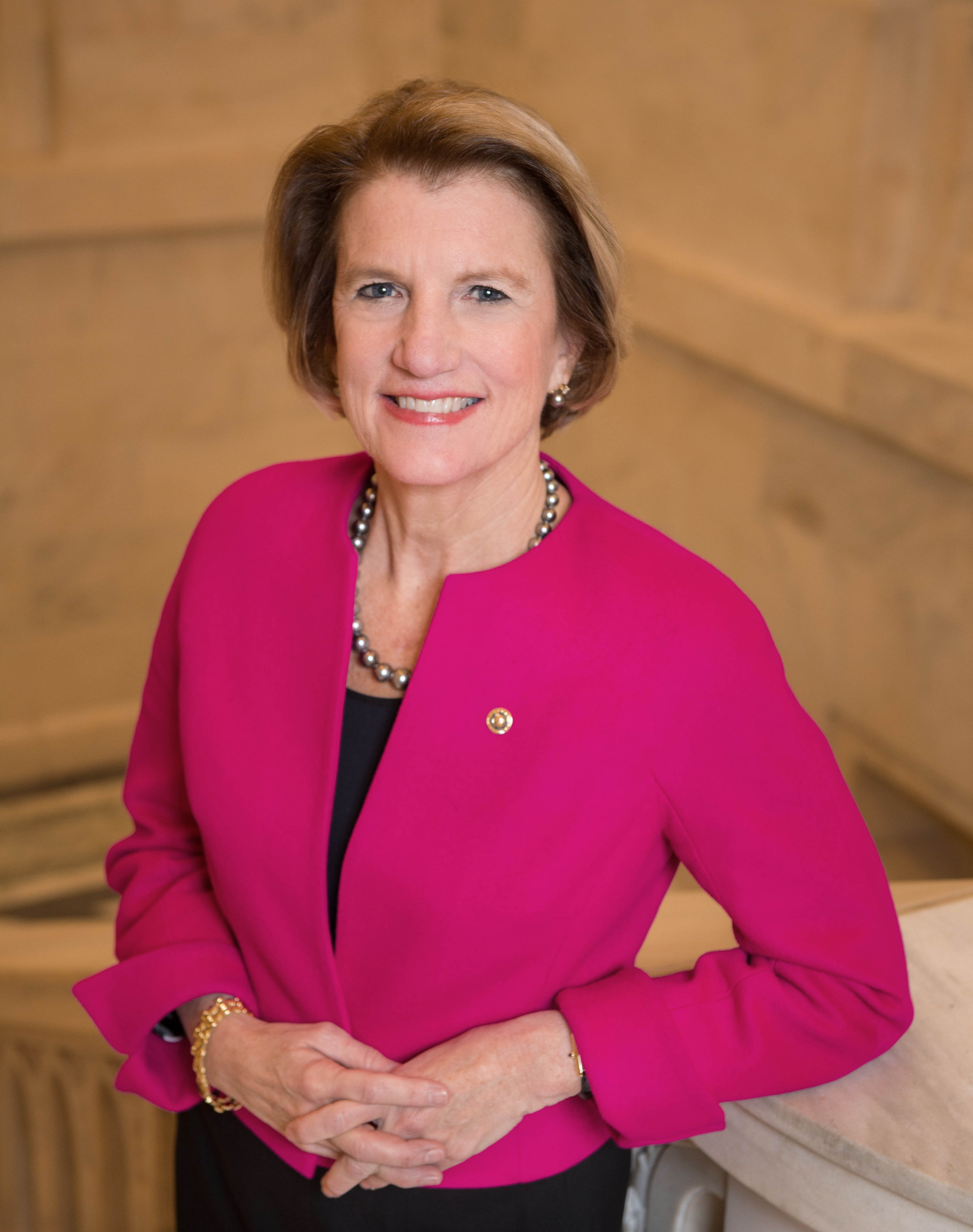
Shelley Moore Capito (R-WV)

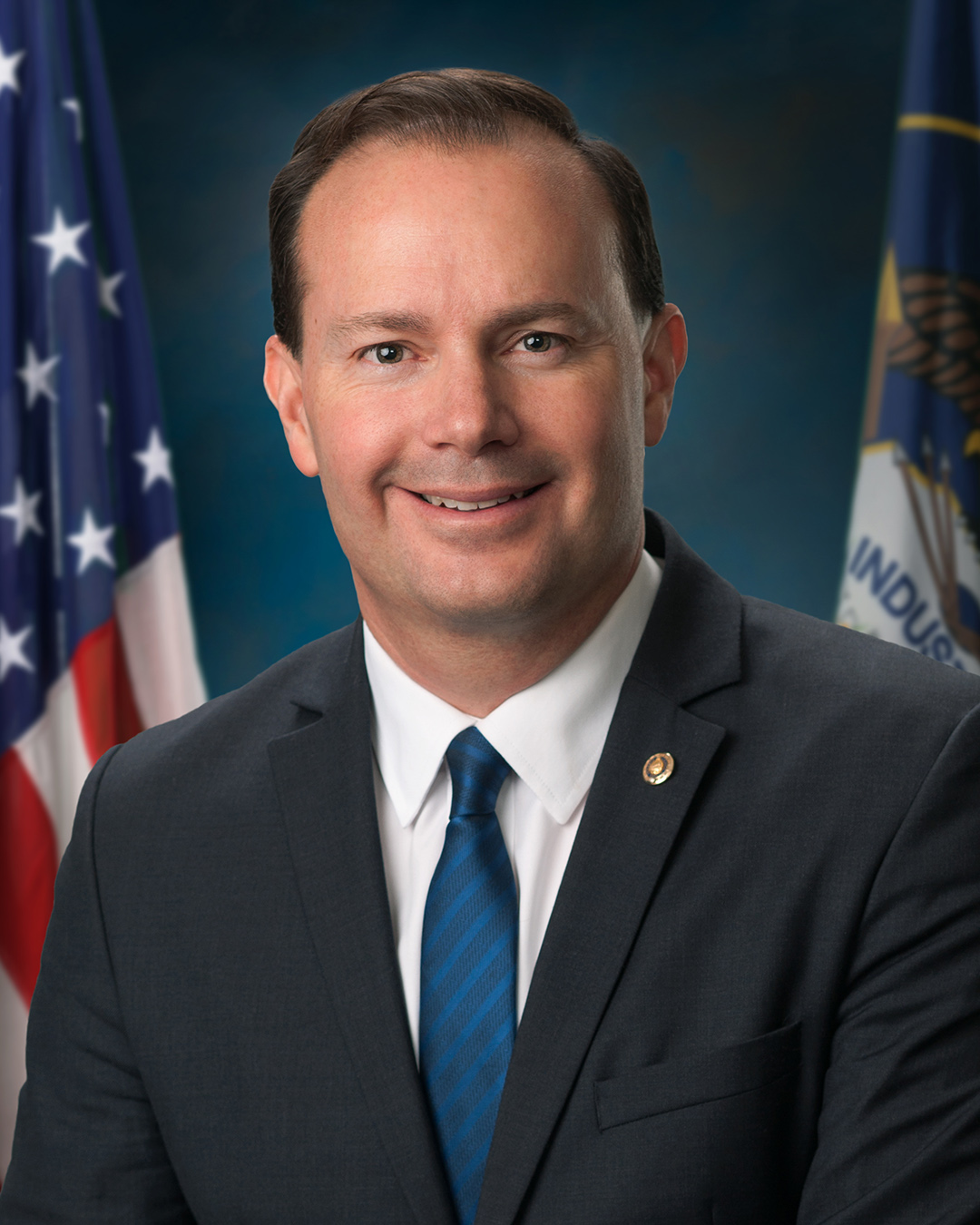
Mike Lee (R-UT)

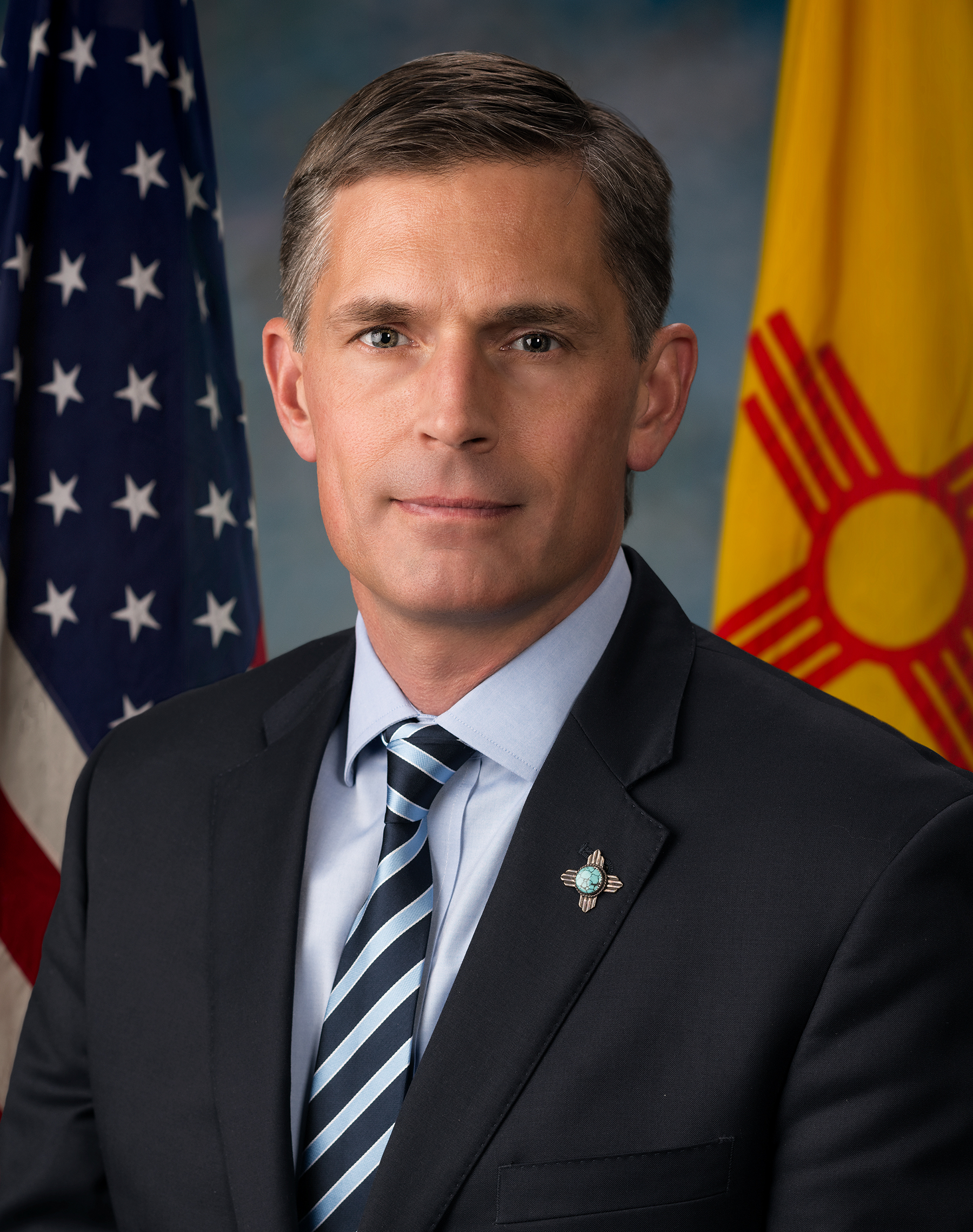
Martin Heinrich (D-NM)

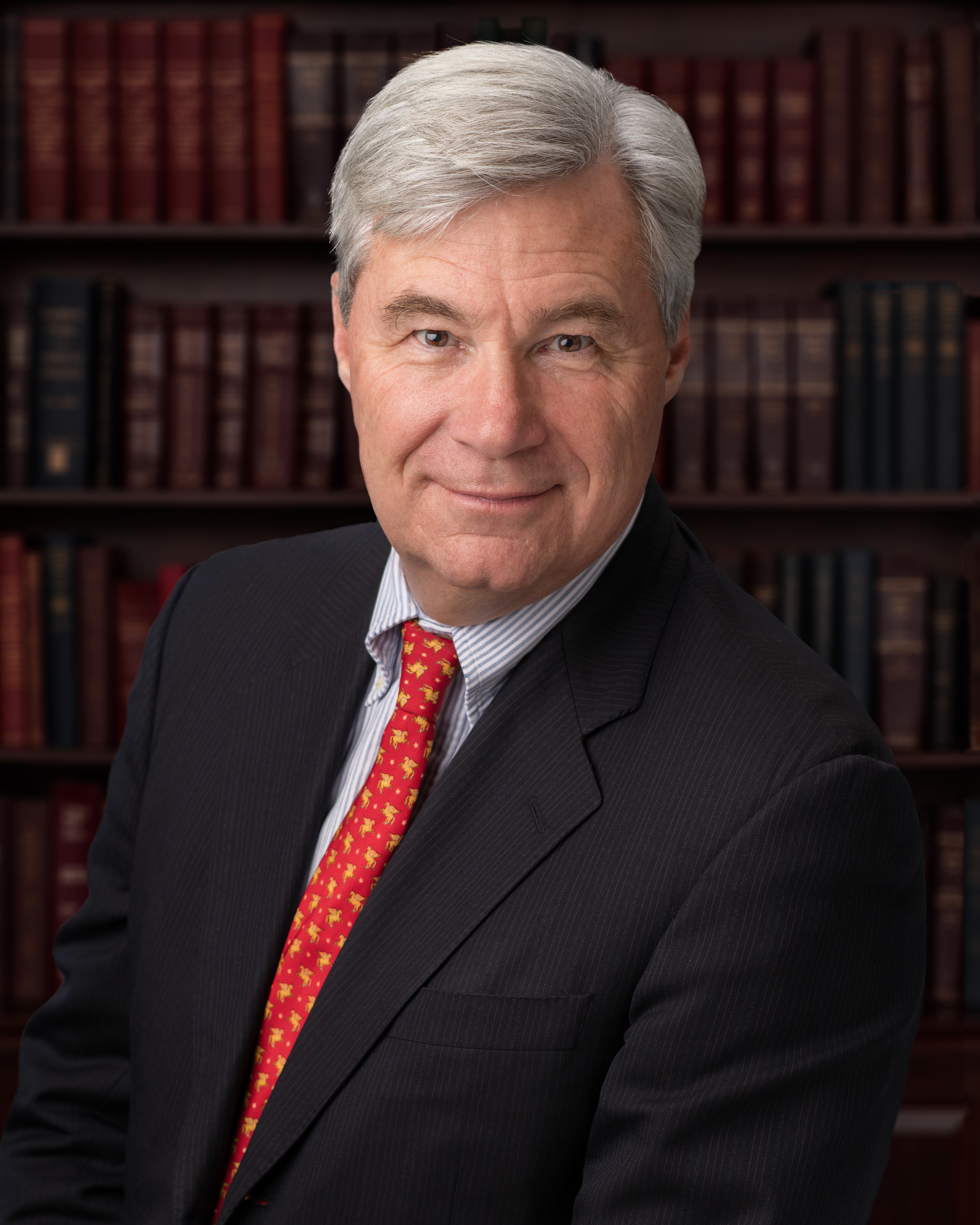
Sheldon Whitehouse (D-RI)

The bill was introduced in the Senate by Senators Heinrich, Lee, Capito, and Whitehouse on September 30, 2026, the day before Congress went on recess for the midterm elections. On their return, the sponsors released a "manager's amendment" on November 7, making changes in response to stakeholder concerns.

BAAJA passed its first cloture vote, to open debate on November 9, 73–25, followed by a motion to end debate on November 16, which passed 70–27, and a final cloture motion on November 18, which passed 65–31. It passed the Senate, 62–33, on November 19.

== Provisions ==
BAAJA is a large bill, touching on many aspects of federal permitting procedure and energy infrastructure. The key provisions are permitting streamlining and certainty, grid planning and distributed-energy integration, and datacenter cost allocation.

=== Permitting ===
==== National Environmental Policy Act ====
The National Environmental Policy Act (NEPA) covers a wide variety of actions which are performed, funded, and permitted by the federal government. BAAJA would make NEPA apply to fewer projects, for example by specifying that a grant supported but not controlled by a federal agency no longer triggers NEPA. It would allow substitution of other state or tribal environmental reviews (for example, the California Environmental Quality Act) to avoid duplication, set deadlines for determinations and reviews, and standardize public comment periods to 45 to 60 days, with an optional extension to 75 days with project sponsor consent. It would also reduce standing to sue under NEPA, requiring that the suing party must have commented about the specific issue they wish to sue about, and been demonstrably harmed by it. The statute of limitations for filing suit is also reduced from the Administrative Procedure Act (APA)'s default six years to 150 days.

Because the APA does not limit the grounds on which a permit can be revoked, permit holders must argue that the revocation was "arbitrary and capricious"; at best, it will be reinstated, but damages are generally not available, so projects can be made unbuildable even if the owners win in court. BAAJA Section 1401 requires agencies to justify themselves with, for example, a court order, evidence of fraud, or a need to prevent "immediate, specific, urgent, substantial, and proximate harm", before a permit is revoked, and makes reopening completed determinations or (under Section 1403) arbitrarily slowing the process just as actionable. The burden of proof is moved to the agency to show that an exception applies, rather than on the permittee to show that the agency was arbitrary and capricious. Damages up to half of the permittee's actual losses are available on final court judgments if the agency is shown to act in bad faith. It also prohibits vacatur as a remedy to a NEPA violation alone unless the underlying decision violated a substantive (not procedural) law, or was "arbitrary and capricious" under the APA. It also provides a savings clause explicitly allowing for future generally-applicable regulations, e.g., Clean Air Act rules.

Section 1402 prohibits "disparate treatment" of projects, allowing a sponsor to sue on the basis that the administration is systematically disfavoring a category of projects rather than judging them on the merits, based on a comparison to the past ten years of permitting of that particular type of project (projects are split into over forty-five categories). Damages are available to recoup actual out-of-pocket costs up to $100 million, if the government is determined to have acted in bad faith. This section has been particularly controversial based on concerns that it would "lock in" a pre-existing pattern of development.

==== Clean Water Act ====
BAAJA significantly narrows state review authority under the Clean Water Act Section 401 water quality certifications strictly to cover direct discharges into navigable waters, which would prevent states from denying projects on concerns like climate change, while doubling the term of National Pollutant Discharge Elimination System (NPDES) permits to ten years. Under the Endangered Species Act, BAAJA reduces Section 7 review deadlines from 90 to 60 days and requires them to conclude by the NEPA deadline, and exempts certain transportation projects in existing rights-of-way and certain permit reassurances from Section 7 review if they already qualify for a categorical exclusion under NEPA. It also allows states to assume Section 7 reviews and requires federal agencies to incorporate states' data on species.

==== National Historic Preservation Act ====
BAAJA also narrows review under Section 106 of the National Historic Preservation Act (NHPA). Fewer projects are covered, as with NEPA, indirect "visual and audible" effects are no longer considered, there are explicit timelines for actions, and an agency can bypass the State or Tribal Historical Preservation Officer and conclude an agreement directly with the Advisory Council on Historic Preservation directly. Courts can also no longer halt projects for Section 106 violations, which greatly reduces the leverage these groups have. (Separately from NHPA, BAAJA also expands tribal authority over rights of way and long-term leases on their lands, in Section 2212.)

=== Electrical grid ===
Many of the electrical grid provisions are similar to those in the Energy Permitting Reform Act of 2024 (EPRA). Currently, FERC, the Federal Energy Regulatory Commission, has "backstop" authority to site interstate transmission lines when states do not act, but this has never been used. BAAJA would simplify this process to match the existing process for natural gas pipelines: once a state has had a year to act on a project, FERC would issue a permit for any line consistent with the public interest which would benefit or protect consumers, would improve reliability, and would facilitate reasonable rates. Any line above 230 kV, or a line which is part of a regional or interregional plan under Section 2103 would qualify. It would also greatly simplify cost allocation for transmission lines: customers pay for core economic benefits like reliability and cheaper power, but not state policy goals like emissions reductions.

Section 2102 would exempt reconductoring and other upgrades of transmission capacity, or the addition of energy storage, on existing rights of way from NEPA and NHPA review. This would include widening rights-of-way up to a quarter mile beyond existing boundaries as needed for safety and reliability, or to complete an upgrade. This would also apply to natural gas pipeline upgrades.

BAAJA also creates an interregional planning process in Sections 2103 through 2105, which would codify the existing FERC process (Order 1920), and link planning to permitting by automatically enabling federal backstop permitting for any line which is part of a regional or interregional plan. It also prohibits federal right of first refusal rules, meaning that incumbent utilities do not have an advantage in building new regional and interregional lines in their territories, standardizing a fragmented system.

Distributed energy resources (DERs), like solar rooftops and residential batteries, can be aggregated into a so-called virtual power plant. Under Section 2108, dispatchable distributed resources (i.e., batteries and generators, but not solar panels) under five megawatts per site would be required to be allowed to participate in wholesale power markets. It would also direct DOE to expand a voluntary permitting program for rooftop solar, home batteries, and electric vehicle chargers which state, local, and tribal permitting entities could adopt, and fund that program.

In response to opposition to AI data centers, Section 2107 requires data centers to use so-called "and" pricing. Large loads connecting to the system can generally either pay for the cost of incremental improvements required to service them, or for their share of the average cost of the entire system. Under BAAJA, data centers would be required to pay for both, which would transfer an additional $35 billion from data center operators to other ratepayers over the following decade. It would also, under Section 2114, direct the Energy Information Administration to provide methods for utilities to track energy usage from data centers.

==== Geothermal ====
BAAJA includes several provisions from H.R. 5631, the Geothermal Energy Advancement Act, which passed the House with bipartisan support. It would put a sixty-day timeline on the Department of the Interior's response to geothermal applications after completing environmental review, create a Geothermal Ombudsman, publish best practices (a geothermal "Gold Book"), require the Interior Department to hold geothermal lease sales annually, and extend categorical exclusions that apply to oil and gas exploration to geothermal exploration.

== Analysis ==
Analysis of the bill's likely effects has been attempted by Resources for the Future, Rhodium Group, and the Center for Climate and Energy Solutions. While the effects of the bill depend on future policy, analyses agree that electrical grid buildout would greatly increase, especially interregionally, consumer costs for electricity would fall, and power sector carbon emissions would fall.

== Reception ==
=== Labor ===
Done right, permitting reform will create good union jobs, help control skyrocketing energy prices, make data centers pay their fair share of energy costs, and unlock critical infrastructure, clean energy, and transit projects. These projects bring down costs and create good jobs.

— Jody Calemine, Letter Supporting Legislation That Would Reform Permitting

Labor groups have been overwhelmingly supportive of the bill. The AFL-CIO, IBEW, and International Union of Operating Engineers are in support; other supporters include North America's Building Trades Unions, the Laborers' International Union of North America, the International Brotherhood of Teamsters, and the International Association of Sheet Metal, Air, Rail and Transportation Workers.

=== Business ===
The United States Chamber of Commerce supports BAAJA as part of its "Permit America to Build" campaign, with over 950 trade organizations signing on. Utilities were initially opposed, but moved to support after the manager's amendment addressed their concerns.

=== Environmental ===
The core thesis of this bill is a bet: Democrats believe renewable energy will win on a level, open playing field, and Republicans believe fossil energy will win. As disconcerting as that bet may be to some people, it is better than any conceivable alternative we could imagine for our politicians, given that they disagree so fundamentally on energy in the first place.

— Daniel Palken, interviewed by David Roberts

Environmental groups are split on the bill. Conservation, environmental justice, and public-interest litigation groups are strongly opposed due to concerns about fossil fuel "lock in", narrowed applicability of vacatur, and faster, simpler environmental reviews. Major groups in opposition include Earthjustice, Natural Resources Defense Council, Sierra Club, and the Center for Biological Diversity. Individuals in opposition include Bill McKibben and Al Gore.

The controversy is substantive; groups in opposition refuse to trade off a certainty of greater fossil fuel production now for the possibility of renewables later, while supporters point to how much harder it is to permit renewables under the status quo as well as significant emissions cuts in the models. Supporters include Evergreen Action, Citizens Climate Lobby, and Searchlight Institute.

=== Housing and urbanism ===
A broad coalition of pro-housing and YIMBY groups support BAAJA, as does the American Public Transit Association. Trade organizations like the National Association of Home Builders are also in support.

=== News media ===
The editorial boards of Bloomberg News, The New York Times, The Wall Street Journal, and The Washington Post published opinions in support of the BAAJA's passage.

Among regional papers, The Houston Chronicle is in support, and the Santa Fe New Mexican is opposed.

=== Historic preservation and tribal nations ===
Tribal sovereignty, meaningful consultation, and the protection of sacred places are not negotiable. Congress must not advance legislation that diminishes these protections or disregards the sovereign rights of Tribal Nations.

— Tribal Organizations Urge Congress to Halt BAAJA Over Threats to Tribal Sovereignty and Sacred Places

Historic preservation groups largely oppose the bill due to the changes it makes to Section 106 of the National Historic Preservation Act. Cultural Heritage Partners has created 106Strong and organized a November 9, 2026 rally on the U.S. Capitol Building West Lawn.

Tribal leaders also depend heavily on Section 106 of the National Historic Preservation Act, and largely oppose BAAJA. The National Congress of American Indians and other regional tribal groups are opposed. Some individual tribes such as the Crow support it based on the opportunity for tribes to build infrastructure on their own land, but they remain in the minority.
