= Data-informed decision-making =

Choosing based on factual information

Data-informed decision-making (DIDM) refers to the collection and analysis of data to guide decisions and improve chances of success. Another form of this process is referred to as data-driven decision-making, "which is defined similarly as making decisions based on hard data as opposed to intuition, observation, or guesswork." DIDM is used in education communities, where data is used with the goal of helping students and improving curricula, among other fields in which data is used to inform decisions. While "data based decision-making" is a more common term, "data-informed decision-making" is the preferred term, since decisions should not be based solely on quantitative data. Data-driven decision-making is commonly used in the context of business growth and entrepreneurship. Many educators have access to some type of a data system for analyzing their students' data. These data systems present data to educators in an over-the-counter data format (embedding labels, supplemental documentation, and a help system, making key package/display and content decisions) to improve the success of educators' data-informed decision-making. In business, fostering and actively supporting data-driven decision-making in their firm and among their colleagues may be one of the central responsibilities of CIOs (Chief Information Officers) or CDOs (Chief Data Officers).

Assessment in higher education is a form of data-driven decision-making aimed at using evidence of what students learn to improve curriculum, student learning, and teaching. Standardized tests, grades, and student work scored by rubrics are forms of student learning outcomes assessment. Formative assessments, Formative assessments, specifically, allow educators to use data from student performance more immediately to modify teaching and learning strategies. There are numerous organizations aimed at promoting the assessment of student learning through DIDM, including the National Institute for Learning Outcomes Assessment, the Association for the Assessment of Student Learning in Higher Education, and, to an extent, the Association of American Colleges and Universities.
