= Kill Switch (book) =

2021 book by Adam Jentleson

Kill Switch: The Rise of the Modern Senate and the Crippling of American Democracy
- Kill Switch book cover
- Author: Adam Jentleson
- Language: English
- Subject: United States Senate, Filibuster in the United States Senate
- Genre: Non-fiction
- Publisher: Boni & Liveright
- Publication date: January 12, 2021
- Pages: 336
- ISBN: 9781631497773

Kill Switch: The Rise of the Modern Senate and the Crippling of American Democracy is a 2021 book by Adam Jentleson, a former aide to Senate Majority Leader Harry Reid. A history of gridlock in Congress, it is primarily a critique of the rise of the filibuster, which the author believes has caused a vetocracy during periods of Democratic Party rule by minority party Republican Party.

Jentleson links the filibuster's rise in particular to efforts to stop civil rights legislation and protections for African Americans. The book received generally positive reviews from critics. Kirkus Reviews described it as "astute", "maddening", and "provocative". The Wall Street Journal published a more critical review, arguing that Jentleson's mentor Reid had used the filibuster on behalf of Democrats and that Jentleson's advocacy against it during Joe Biden's presidency was cynical and hypocritical.
