= Varo Bank =

American neobank

- Company type: Private
- Industry: Financial services
- Founded: 2015; 11 years ago in San Francisco, United States
- Founder: Colin Walsh
- Headquarters: Salt Lake City, Utah, United States
- Area served: United States
- Key people: Gavin Michael (CEO); Colin Walsh (Board Member); Pepe Porrata (COO)
- Products: Banking services
- Number of employees: 700 (2021)
- Parent: Varo Money
- Capital ratio: 62.7% (2021) Tier 1
- Website: varomoney.com

Varo Bank is an American neobank headquartered in Salt Lake City, Utah. Launched in 2017, Varo was the first neobank to receive a national bank charter from the Office of the Comptroller of the Currency.

== History ==
Varo Bank's parent company, Varo Money, was founded in 2015 in San Francisco, California by Colin Walsh. Walsh initially raised US$27 million from private equity firm Warburg Pincus to start the company and developed a mobile banking app. The app was released in 2017 and allowed users to make direct deposits, get a debit card, and pay bills online. Users are not charged overdraft, ATM, or minimum balance fees. Accounts were opened in partnership with The Bancorp Bank.

In 2017, Walsh began the process of seeking a national bank charter as a neobank. Varo raised an additional US$45 million in 2018 from Warburg Pincus and The Rise Fund.

In 2020, the Federal Deposit Insurance Corporation granted approval for Varo to use federal deposit insurance. Late that year, the Office of the Comptroller of the Currency granted the charter, making Varo the first fintech company to receive a national bank charter in the United States. Following the grant of its charter, Varo purchased its two million customer accounts from Bancorp. Chad Brownstein and Russell Westbrook were early investors in the company.

Varo was criticized in 2021 for closing customer accounts in error. It responded by ensuring the affected customers' money was returned with an additional US$100. By September 2021, Varo raised US$992 million, including US$510 million in Series E funding led by Lone Pine Capital. At the time, Varo had approximately 4 million opened accounts. That year, Varo doubled its workforce to approximately 700 employees. The neobank laid off 75 employees as a cost cutting measure in July 2022.

In 2023, Varo was named one of Inc magazine's "Best in Business" from 2021 to 2023. It was also recognized by Forbes as a member of the magazine's "Fintech 50" and by Fast Company as one of the "Most Innovative Companies in Finance" in 2021. It was recognized by CNBC as one of the "World's Top Fintech Companies" in 2024.

In 2025, it was announced that Gavin Michael, who previously served as CEO of Bakkt, would be taking over as Varo's CEO; Walsh will remain a board member.

== Operations ==
Varo is headquartered in Salt Lake City, Utah. It moved its headquarters from San Francisco in 2020. The company is led by founder and chief executive officer Colin Walsh, President of Varo Money and chief operating officer Pepe Porrata, chief financial officer Thibault Fulconis, and chief technology officer Sachin Shetty.

Varo products include checking and savings accounts, "Varo to Anyone", which allows customers to instantly transfer funds to any American debit card, free tax filing services,
