= The Institute for College Access and Success =

Non-profit organization

The Institute for College Access and Success (TICAS) is a non-profit organization founded by Lauren Asher and Robert Shireman in 2005 that works to make higher education more available and affordable for people in the United States. Headquartered in Oakland, California, with a satellite office in Washington D.C., it conducts research, analysis, and provides advocacy. Its work has been cited by USA Today, Forbes, U.S. News & World Report, and The Atlantic.

The Institute staffs the Project on Student Debt, and produces an annual report on student debt in the U.S. used by journalists and others needing the most recent data on higher education.

== Work ==
TICAS created the policy model and led the movement for what became the first widely available income-based student loan repayment plan (IBR), which President Bush signed into law in 2007. In addition to being a longtime advocate of Pell grants, the organization also changed the concept of student loans to student debt.

On Nov. 13, 2014 US News reported that according to TICAS About 70 percent of 2013 graduates left college with an average of $28,400 in student loan debt in the United States. There was great variation between both states and colleges: The average loan amounts were as low as $18,656 in some states, while other states topped $30,000; The average loan amounts ranged from $2,500 to $71,000 depending on the school.
