= Searchlight Institute =

Washington, D.C. political think tank

- Named after: Searchlight, Nevada, the birthplace of Senate Majority Leader Harry Reid
- Formation: September 16, 2025; 14 months ago
- Founder: Adam Jentleson
- Type: Public policy think tank
- Headquarters: Washington, D.C., U.S.
- President: Adam Jentleson
- Staff: 12

The Searchlight Institute is a public policy think tank based in Washington, D.C. It was founded in 2025 by Democratic Party strategist Adam Jentleson. It aims to build out centrist stances for the party.

The organization advocates for out-of-the-box thinking, described by Jentleson as heterodoxy, in liberal and Democratic public policymaking. In 2025, Searchlight published research suggesting that Democrats should avoid campaigning on climate change and be more willing to "embrace positions from different ideologies."

In 2026, Searchlight has distributed policy recommendations and polling regarding transgender rights and social acceptance, illegal immigration and U.S.-Mexico border security, grid modernization, and the U.S. health care system. The group advocates against abolishing U.S. Immigration and Customs Enforcement (ICE) and opposes proposals for a federal moratorium on the construction of new AI data centers.

Among its publications, Searchlight has proposed "free primary care for all," federal efforts to break up health care monopolies and regulate private equity, stronger unemployment and workforce benefits such as job training, a public option for health insurance, the restriction of asylum in the United States, and a cash rebate for homeowners and renters intended to incentivize new housing construction in regions with a high cost of living.

Ahead of the 2026 federal government shutdowns, The Washington Post reported that "leaders have in private been pointing to recent memos from Searchlight" urging Democrats in the United States Senate to use their leverage in funding negotiations over the Department of Homeland Security and impose reforms for ICE and Customs and Border Patrol.

The organization launched Tech Viaduct, a planning project reportedly sourcing policy ideas and personnel to counter the impact of the Trump Administration's Department of Government Efficiency (DOGE), in January 2026.

== Key people ==
Searchlight's associated policy fellows and advisors to its projects have included:

- Blas Nuñez-Neto — Former Assistant Secretary of Homeland Security for Border and Immigration Policy (2021-2024)
- Denis McDonough — Former Secretary of Veterans Affairs (2021-2025)
- James Kvaal — Former Under Secretary of Education (2021-2025)
- Josh Jacobs — Former Under Secretary of Veterans Affairs for Benefits (2023-2025)
- Mara Kiesling — Founder of the National Center for Transgender Equality
- Marc J. Dunkelman — Author of Why Nothing Works (2025)
- Mikey Dickerson — Former Administrator of the United States Digital Service
- Robby Mook — Former campaign manager for Hillary Clinton's 2016 presidential campaign
- Stephanie Feldman — Former White House Staff Secretary (2023-2025)
