= Chad Brownstein =

American businessman

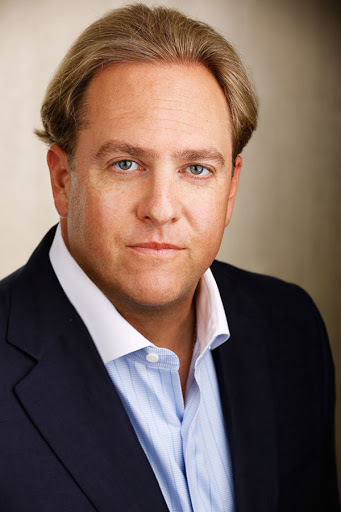
- Born: Chad Tyler Brownstein; February 12, 1973 (age 53); Denver, Colorado
- Occupations: Businessman, entrepreneur, industrialist
- Years active: 2000–present
- Website: www.chadbrownstein.com.

Chad Tyler Brownstein (born February 12, 1973) is an American businessman, entrepreneur, industrialist and amateur golfer based in Los Angeles, California. He is a former vice chairman of Banc of California. He is also the founder and current chief executive officer at Rocky Mountain Resources, a limited liability company that acquires and develops natural resource assets. The company is currently headquartered in Denver, Colorado. Brownstein also serves on the board of directors for the Los Angeles 2028 Summer Olympics committee.

== Biography ==
Brownstein was born in 1973, in Denver, Colorado, to Sunny and Norman Brownstein. His father is a lawyer and his mother is a social worker. Brownstein completed his early education at Kent Denver School where he was First Team All State in football. Brownstein attended and graduated from Tulane University in 1995. He was two-year varsity letterman on the golf team. He also attended Columbia Business School till 1999. During his time at Tulane, he also worked at Donaldson, Lufkin & Jenrette in the real estate investment and merchant banking groups.

Brownstein co-founded ITU Ventures, a venture capital investment company in Los Angeles, in 2000. Glenn Hubbard, the former Chairman of the Council of Economic Advisors, was one of his advisors at ITU Ventures. Brownstein successfully led investments at ITU Ventures, that were sold to companies like Nokia, AMD, Weyerhauser and Cadence.

Brownstein founded Rocky Mountain Resources and predecessor entities in 2006, in Denver. The company focuses on natural resources and has taken possession of multiple assets in the United States. New York City-based Bloomberg Television has called Brownstein, a Shale Pioneer for his findings in the Niobrara Shale.

In 2010, Brownstein co founded the enterprise now known as Banc of California.

Brownstein is also a nationally recognized amateur golfer, he was the amateur winner at the Humana Challenge PGA Tour in 2012 and 2014. Brownstein has also been ranked among the top 25 amateurs in the State of Colorado.

Brownstein serves on the board of governors at Cedars Sinai Medical Center. He is also one of the board of directors for the LA 2028 Olympic committee. Brownstein also held finance chair for LA Conservation Corp. He was also formerly a board members of California Competes.

== Philanthropy ==
Brownstein has supported the renovation of Pauley Pavilion and was a major benefactor to the construction of the Mo Ostin Basketball Center at University of California, Los Angeles. He has also partnered with NBA star Russell Westbrook to help improve financial literacy in the African American community.
