= Robert Shireman =

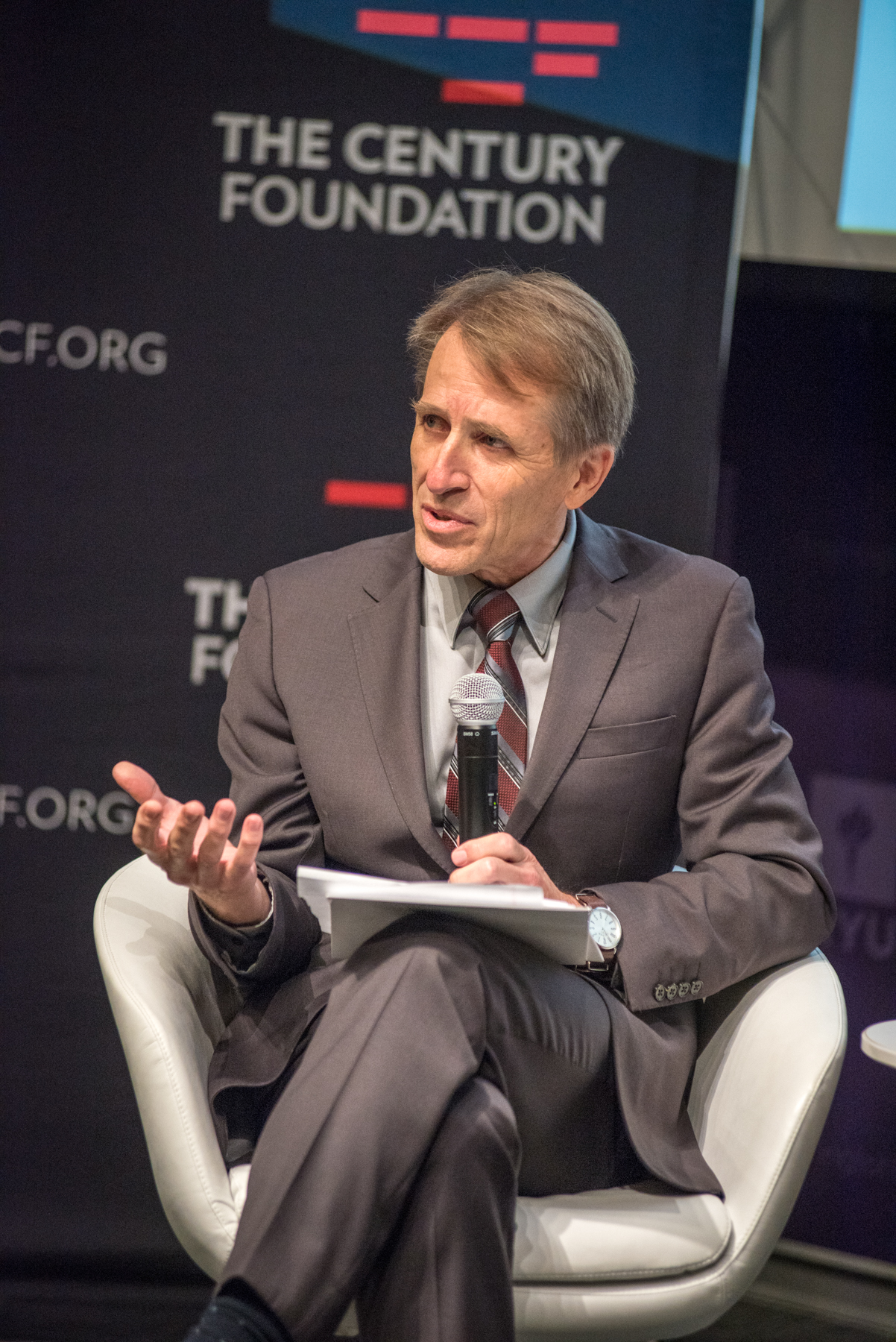
Robert Shireman discusses college costs and affordability at a 2018 event

Robert M. (Bob) Shireman is an American higher education policy expert and nonprofit leader, most recently as the director of higher education excellence at The Century Foundation. Shireman served as the first deputy undersecretary of education in the Obama Administration in 2009–10. He had previously worked in the U.S. Senate (working on the 1992 rewrite of the Higher Education Act), the Clinton Administration, and at nonprofit organizations, including one he founded, The Institute for College Access and Success (TICAS).

== Education ==
Shireman earned his B.A. in economics from the University of California at Berkeley (UC Berkeley), a masters in public administration from the University of San Francisco, and a masters in education from the Harvard Graduate School of Education.

== Early career ==
After college, Shireman opened a lobbying office in Sacramento for the California Public Interest Research Group (CALPIRG), a Ralph Nader-inspired organization in which he had been active as a student at UC Berkeley. Among the issues Shireman pursued was the problem of toxic chemicals in art supplies. At the age of 23, he and a colleague were successful in enacting reforms where other more seasoned advocates had failed, an effort Art News called “a classic case in political action, timing, effective lobbying and organization.”

After CALPIRG, Shireman started working with Consumers Union to address the problem of monied interests in California politics. In September 1986, he and other reformers charged the banking lobby with attempting to bribe state legislators with campaign contributions delivered just as interstate banking legislation was being considered. Shireman became involved in a campaign to enact an initiative to limit campaign contributions and spending on the June 1988 ballot. Dueling successful initiatives led to a complicated result.

== Clinton administration ==
While serving as an education advisor to U.S. Senator Paul Simon, Shireman played a significant role in the development and implementation of Bill Clinton's 1992 campaign promise to “scrap” the student loan program and replace it with a national service trust fund that would allow all students to borrow money for college and then repay it either as a small percentage of income over time or through two years of public service. Shireman's role is detailed in a 1996 book, "The Bill," by then-journalist Steven Waldman. Shireman joined the Clinton Administration at the end of the first term and took on the role of shepherding a 1996 campaign promise to create a tax credit for college tuition. In his two years at the White House he also had the lead role in the administration's America Reads Initiative and in the creation of the pre-college preparation program, GEAR UP (Gaining Early Awareness and Readiness for Undergraduate Programs).

Shireman had a small role in the media response to emerging Monica Lewinsky revelations. In January 1998, with reporters hungry for new information about the scandal, White House Press Secretary Mike McCurry sought to demonstrate that the administration was working on real policy issues. As described in the Washington Post: “One day, knowing full well the networks couldn't care less, he brought out Robert Shireman, senior policy adviser at the National Economic Council, to talk about school construction bonds.”

== TICAS and the Obama administration ==
While at the Department of Education in 2009–10, Shireman put into effect much of the agenda he had developed previously at TICAS, a nonprofit he had founded. TICAS had recommended simplifying the FAFSA (the application process for federal aid) by employing skip logic and allowing applicants to upload their income information from the IRS. As deputy undersecretary Shireman led the successful implementation of that plan.

When President Obama took office in 2009, a liquidity crisis had prevented access to bank-based guaranteed student loans. To preserve access and reduce taxpayer costs, the administration, with Shireman in a lead role, proposed shifting to a 100 percent direct loan system. Originally proposed by Congressman George Miller as the Student Aid and Fiscal Responsibility Act, the direct loan plan ultimately was attached to the Affordable Care Act, along with a provision Obama proposed to make the income-based repayment (IBR) option more generous to borrowers. IBR was modeled on a TICAS proposal adopted by Congress in 2007.

Shireman is sometimes described as the “architect” of the Obama administration's consumer protection regulations, including clarifying the Higher Education Act's gainful employment provision that determines for-profit college access to federal funding. While Shireman did play a major role in launching that effort, all of the regulations were adopted by the Department of Education months or years after his return home to California in the summer of 2010.

== Other government roles ==
In May 2020, Shireman was appointed by California Governor Gavin Newsom to serve as one of the state's representatives to the Western Interstate Commission for Higher Education. In October, 2020, House Speaker Nancy Pelosi appointed him to a term on the National Advisory Committee on Institutional Quality and Integrity. From 2004 to 2009 Shireman served as a congressional appointee to the federal Advisory Committee on Student Financial Assistance.

== Lawsuits and investigations ==
=== GOP Million Dollar Medicare Challenge ===
In 1995, the newly elected Republican congress proposed a budget that would slow the growth of spending in the Medicare program. President Clinton accused the GOP of sacrificing the health of seniors to fund tax cuts for the rich. Stung by the claim that congress was proposing “cuts” to Medicare, the Republican National Committee placed full-page advertisements in national newspapers featuring party chair Haley Barbour holding a giant million-dollar check. The ad said: "Heard the one about Republicans cutting' Medicare? The fact is Republicans are increasing Medicare spending by more than half. I'm Haley Barbour, and I'm so sure of that fact I'm willing to give you this check for a million dollars if you can prove me wrong."

Shireman mailed an entry to the contest, arguing that by using the transitive form of the verb “increase” the RNC was asserting causation. Since Medicare spending under the GOP plan would be lower than without it, the RNC's claim was false, asserted Shireman. When the RNC failed to award the prize, Shireman's attorney David Halperin filed a breach of contract case in Washington, DC. The lawsuit survived a motion to dismiss, making a jury trial likely. The RNC subsequently sued all 80 people who had entered the contest, moving the case to federal court in Jackson, Mississippi. Halperin moved that the court transfer the case to federal court in Washington, D.C., and the court granted that motion. Shireman and the RNC ultimately settled, while 20 other people stayed in the suit for years.

=== Short seller allegation ===
After Wall Street short-seller Steve Eisman testified about for-profit colleges in 2010, the industry started attempting to link critics to Eisman, claiming the Department of Education's gainful employment regulatory efforts may have been tainted. Anonymous letters alleged "stock price manipulation by Shireman and Eisman." An investigation was conducted by the department's Inspector General at the request of two Republican senators. It found "no improper disclosure of sensitive information by Department officials in their communications with outside parties. It found that one official may have communicated with a former employer in violation of an ethics pledge, a matter that was referred for further investigation.

Opponents of for-profit colleges alleged that some groups that were raising the short-seller allegations were being paid to do so by the industry. One liberal group was later found to have been taking money from a for-profit college owner's foundation.

=== California community college governance ===
In 2012, California Competes, a panel of civic leaders staffed by Shireman and chaired by then-Long Beach Mayor Bob Foster, issued a report calling for changes to California’s higher education system. One recommendation sought to reverse California Community College regulations the group said undermined campus leadership and led to costly stalemates. Under Shireman's leadership the group filed a lawsuit asking a judge to throw out the rules as inconsistent with the law enacted by the legislature. The suit was not successful.

== Call for retraction ==
In 2021, Bob Shireman publicly called for a retraction of a 2013 Wall Street Journal article that he says damaged his public reputation by reporting unsubstantiated allegations of insider trading. Shireman added that enemies continue to use the WSJ article to tarnish his efforts. According to National Public Radio's David Folkenflick, "There's no evidence — none — to support any of those claims, despite two federal investigations." The Wall Street Journal, however, has refused to make the retraction or offer an apology.
