= Why Nothing Works =

2025 non-fiction book by Marc J. Dunkelman

Why Nothing Works: Who Killed Progress—and How to Bring It Back
- Author: Marc J. Dunkelman
- Genre: Nonfiction
- Publisher: PublicAffairs
- Publication date: 2025
- ISBN: 978-1541700215

Why Nothing Works: Who Killed Progress—and How to Bring It Back is a 2025 non-fiction book by Marc J. Dunkelman. Dunkelman is a fellow at the Watson School of International and Public Affairs.

== Summary ==
Why Nothing Works examines the tension in the progressive movement between the idea that problems are better resolved by reducing centralized power and the idea that problems are better resolved by increasing centralized power. Dunkelman characterizes the two tendencies as Jeffersonian and Hamiltonian. Using reproductive freedom and climate change as an example, progressive efforts for reproductive freedom reflect the Jeffersonian mindset of reducing government control over individual actions, while the Hamiltonian approach to climate change seeks institutions and regulations to compel action.

The book discusses how the focus in the progressive movement has swung from using central power to achieve its goals to constraining and gutting central power.

In an interview on NPR, Dunkelman explains the problem with the modern progressive aversion to centralized power:

We've swung from one extreme where folks like Robert Moses could do almost whatever they wanted without anybody being able to say anything to another, where almost any objection stops everything cold.

== Reception ==
A review in The Wall Street Journal takes issue with Dunkelman's argument that "a failure of process" is the underlying problem and proposes that "the concrete demands progressives place on it" are more relevant to government problems. Tej Parikh, reviewing the book for the Financial Times, writes that Why Nothing Works is timely, insightful, and interesting, and that "its assessment is equally applicable to Europe". In The New Yorker, Benjamin Wallace-Wells describes the book as "a history of twentieth-century progressive policymaking".

Daniel DiSalvo, writing in City Journal, notes that Dunkelman's recommendations for changes are vague. He criticizes the absence of conservatives from the book's narrative, as well as the inattention to unions and urban political machines. DiSalvo concludes, though, that "Dunkelman has produced a thought-provoking contribution to the growing consensus that American government is too sclerotic. His central insight—that the diffuse allocation of political power has crippled America’s capacity to build and adapt—resonates across ideological lines."

Lorraine Glennon in Columbia Magazine also feels that the book's weakness is in suggested fixes. Glennon writes that Why Nothing Works is "chock-full of revelations and fascinating tidbits".
