= Adam Jentleson =

American writer

- Education: Columbia University (BA)
- Notable work: Kill Switch: The Rise of the Modern Senate and the Crippling of American Democracy (2021)
- Father: Bruce Jentleson

Adam Jentleson is an American writer, political commentator, and former chief of staff to John Fetterman.

== Early life and education ==
Jentleson is the son of Bruce Jentleson, professor at Duke University and former director of the Sanford School of Public Policy. He attended Montgomery County Public Schools and lives in Takoma Park, Maryland.

Jentleson received a BA in American History from Columbia University in 2003.

== Career ==
Jentleson began his career as a policy researcher and speechwriter for the John Kerry 2004 presidential campaign. He then served as Manager of Congressional Affairs at the Center for American Progress, speechwriter for the 2008 presidential campaign of John Edwards.

Jentleson served as communications director and, later, deputy chief of staff for United States Senator Harry Reid from 2010 to 2016. The New York Times published his essay The Side of Harry Reid Most People Never Saw the day after Senator Reid's passing on December 28, 2021.

Jentleson is a columnist for GQ. Jentleson has also contributed commentary to Politico Magazine and The Washington Post. His 2021 debut book, Kill Switch: The Rise of the Modern Senate and the Crippling of American Democracy, provides an extensive critique of the United States Senate, particularly the rise of the filibuster during the 19th century and 20th century to slow the advancement of civil rights legislation for American minorities, particularly African Americans.

In 2021, Jentleson co-founded the political consultancy Battle Born Collective with Rebecca Kirzner Katz, also a former communications director for Reid. That same year, Jentleson's partner came out as nonbinary and began to transition, causing them to split. Amidst this development, Jentleson began urging the Democratic Party to recalibrate its position away from the left on issues involving transgender sports participation and access to healthcare.

In 2022, Jentleson chaired a political action committee financed by Dustin Moskovitz in a failed attempt to oust Montgomery County executive Marc Elrich.

In mid-November 2022, Pennsylvania's newly elected U.S. Senator John Fetterman announced the appointment of Jentleson as transition committee co-chair and, a few weeks later, in early December, named Jentleson as his chief of staff. Jentleson resigned from Sen. Fetterman's office in the spring of 2024 and wrote a letter expressing his concerns about Fetterman's mental health to Fetterman's doctor in May 2024. Jentleson has been described as a centrist and has stated that "The [liberal] backlash that happens online is actually the sign that you're doing something right".

In 2025, he founded the new Searchlight Institute. In a 2026 interview with Ezra Klein, Jentleson argued in an interview that Democratic candidates should embrace issues he described as sending "powerful signals to voters." This included candidates "open to things like spanking," as well as “opposing homeless encampments". His comments about spanking received criticism over corporal punishment's impact on children.

== Bibliography ==
- Jentleson, Adam (January 12, 2021). Kill Switch: The Rise of the Modern Senate and the Crippling of American Democracy. Boni & Liveright. ISBN 9781631497773.
- Jentleson, Adam (2026). Supermajority: How Democrats Can Build Lasting Power. W. W. Norton & Company. ISBN 9781324092193.
