= California Competes =

California Competes is an American nonprofit policy organization seeking to increase access to college and improve college graduation rates. Created in 2011 by civic and business leaders in California, the group has labeled the state's higher education system dysfunctional and called for better coordination and planning for the future needs of the state's economy. The group's work has included advocating for a more robust statewide education data system and for greater financial supports for parents in college. Prior research had revealed that lower-income areas of the state were being shortchanged in the support they were receiving for community colleges.

In 2012 California Competes began an effort to make college accreditation documents publicly available if the college receives public funds. A law sponsored by the organization was enacted in 2014, requiring accreditor evaluation reports and decision letters to be posted on the web sites of colleges receiving state financial aid. At the time of passage the major western states accreditors had already responded to the call by posting decision letters and evaluation team reports on their web sites.

One of the group's first reports faulted a California Community College regulation for contributing to costly stalemates between campus stakeholders. After the statewide community college chancellor refused to consider a change to the regulation, California Competes filed a lawsuit asking a judge to throw out the rules as inconsistent with the law enacted by the legislature. The lawsuit was not successful.

In 2015, California Competes and other organizations sponsored a campaign to highlight innovative efforts by colleges to improve student success and reduce costs. The effort was fueled by a $50 million grant program sponsored by Governor Jerry Brown.

As part of a college affordability project sponsored by the Lumina Foundation, California Competes created a prototype calculator aimed at helping prospective college students consider not only the potential future earnings from college, but also their own estimation of the enjoyment of college itself and their passion for learning.

California Competes is governed by a council that was chaired for the group's first several years by Bob Foster, mayor of Long Beach. The staff are led by executive director Su Jin Gatlin Jez. Her predecessor, Lande Ajose, moved on in 2019 to become higher education advisor to Governor Gavin Newsom. The group's first director, Robert Shireman, left to join the Century Foundation in 2015.
