= Energy Permitting Reform Act of 2024 =

Proposed US energy legislation

- Long title: A bill to reform leasing, permitting, and judicial review for certain energy and minerals projects, and for other purposes.
- Acronyms (colloquial): EPRA
- Announced in: the 118th United States Congress

Legislative history
- Introduced in the United States Senate as S. 4753 by Joe Manchin (I‑WV), John Barrasso (R‑WY) on July 23, 2024; Committee consideration by United States Senate Committee on Energy and Natural Resources

The Energy Permitting Reform Act of 2024 (S.4753) is a bill in the United States Senate to reform the permitting system for fossil fuel, renewable energy and electric power transmission infrastructure development. It is one of the several iterations of permitting reform brought forth by the 118th Congress. The bill was introduced by Senators Joe Manchin (I-WV) and John Barrasso (R-WY) in July 2024.

The last action on the bill was taken in August 2024. The Senate Energy and Natural Resources Committee cleared the bill from the committee with a 15-4 margin and only one additional amendment.

== Legislative background ==
Energy permitting reform is the idea of altering regulations and rules to make it easier to build energy infrastructure in the United States. Currently, it takes a long time for energy infrastructure, such as electric transmission, to be built. This is particularly concerning as we are transitioning away from fossil fuels to clean energy sources due to climate change. For example, when there is not enough transmission to connect clean energy to the grid, they enter "interconnection queues", a waiting list for clean energy to essentially get turned on. The interconnection queues have gotten longer over the years.

Energy permitting reform is also important as electricity demand and costs rise. Such demands are driven by things, such as climate change (e.g. increased electrification) and artificial intelligence use.

The primary debates in the energy permitting reform space center around two questions.

1. How much deregulation (or policy change) should occur?
2. How should policy changes be applied to clean energy sources vs fossil fuel production?

For the first question, energy permitting reform would likely alter the National Environmental Policy Act, one of the most foundational environmental legislation in United States history. Such changes could have unintended consequences on other environmental issues if not carefully crafted.

For the second question, many permitting reform legislation increase deployment opportunities for both clean energy and fossil fuel production. Many are critical about whether the tradeoff to make electrification easier and increase clean infrastructure, such as offshore wind production, is worth also increasing fossil fuel production, like mining and liquified natural gas.

== History ==
The Act was introduced by Senators Joe Manchin (I-WV) and John Barrasso (R-WY) on July 22, 2024.

The United States Senate Committee on Energy and Natural Resources passed the bill on July 31, 2024 with broad bipartisan support, 15–4. Only one proposed amendment was included, one added by Senator Steve Daines (R‑MT) intended to speed up reviews for forestry development. The bill was assessed as unlikely to appear on the floor before the 2024 United States elections due to Democratic opposition to speeding up construction of fossil fuel projects and Republican reluctance to give Democrats a public victory, but the measure could receive more attention during the lame-duck session. It was tabled on December 19, 2024.

== Main policy provisions ==
As stated in the legislation, the primary purpose of the bill is to reduce the barriers to energy deployment and mining activities. The bill is described as a bipartisan compromise.

Some examples of specific policy provisions include:

- establishing a 150-day statute of limitation for judicial review
- requiring the Department of Interior to increase leasing, extend permitting, and streamline federal permitting for gas, oil, coal, geothermal, and offshore wind
- addressing the three main barriers to transmission development: planning, permitting, and paying
- modifying regulatory requirements for mining, liquefied natural gas, geothermal, and hydropower

== Reactions and criticisms ==
Reactions have been mixed, with centrist environmental advocates and energy industry groups—both renewable and fossil fuel—supportive, while other environmental groups and some climate scientists oppose.

The nonpartisan Citizens' Climate Lobby supports the legislation: "Expert analysis from the most trusted climate and energy modelers finds this legislation could reduce America's climate pollution up to 25% by 2050. That means Congress could notch a huge climate win by passing this bill!" Centrist think tank and advocacy organization Third Way published model predictions that the EPRA would lower total emissions, even in the worst case, describing electrical transmission capacity as a bottleneck for development of electrical generation facilities, 95% of them clean.

Other groups that support the legislation include the Niskanen Center, Bipartisan Policy Center, and Solar Energy Industries Association. The National Ocean Industries Association praised provisions that would help oil and gas drilling in the Gulf of Mexico, while the Solar Energy Industries Association supported provisions that would aid the transmission projects required to carry electrical power from generation facilities to users.

A number of environmental groups oppose the act for opening public lands and offshore waters to oil and gas leasing and aiding the approval of natural gas export facilities (liquefied natural gas terminals), a position represented by Senator Bernie Sanders. For example, the Sierra Club has stated that "Those who promote this kind of so-called 'permitting reform' claim that it's necessary to accelerate the deployment of clean energy, but in truth this is nothing more than yet another attempt by fossil fuel industry boosters to give handouts for polluters at the expense of our communities and the climate. We urge Congress to put forward real solutions to build a clean energy economy, and not pair those reforms with more attempts to pad the pockets of fossil fuel executives under the guise of reducing emissions." In addition, 300+ environmental groups signed a letter against this legislation with similar concerns. A number of climate scientists, such as Mark Z. Jacobson, have also offered predictions that the EPRA would increase global emissions by way of fossil fuel exports more than the renewable energy and transmission improvements would reduce domestic power sector emissions, opinions reflected by proponents' descriptions of the bill as a compromise, with Liesl Clark at the University of Michigan calling it not "exactly what the enviros would want. I don't think it's exactly what the other side, broadly speaking, wants either. You get to good legislation when there’s something in it for everybody, but nothing there is everyone’s wishlist."

Other concerns, mostly from conservatives, include the way the bill handles states' rights. Specifically, some are concerned that it oversteps state jurisdiction.

== See also ==
- United States energy law
- Bipartisan American Affordability and Jobs Act of 2026
