= Bruce Jentleson =

American political scientist

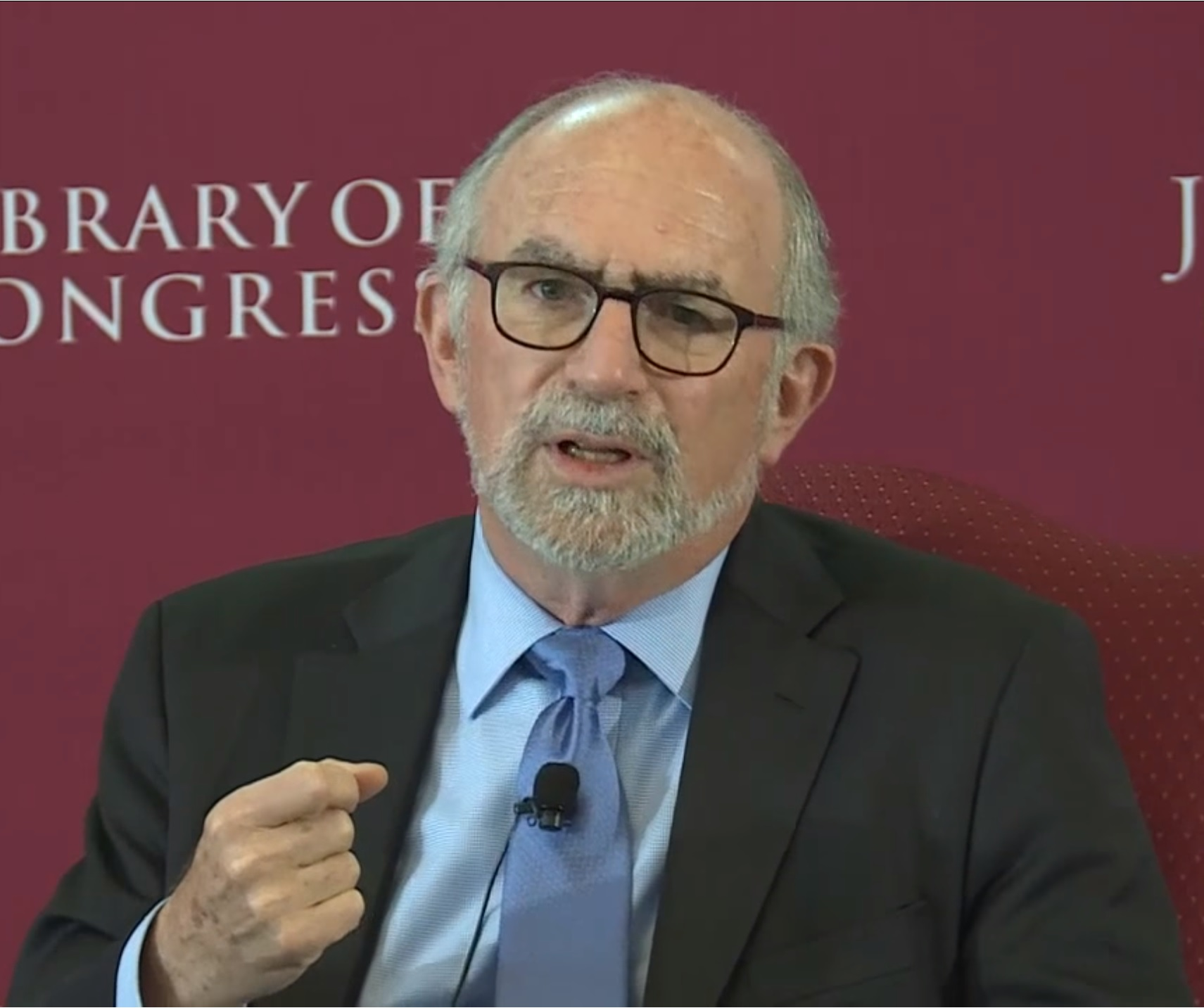
- Jentleson speaks at the Library of Congress in 2019
- Born: Bruce W. Jentleson; June 26, 1951 (age 75); New York City, NY
- Spouse: Barbara Cooney Jentleson
- Children: Adam Jentleson and Katherine Jentleson

Academic background
- Education: Cornell University; London School of Economics and Political Science
- Thesis: Pipeline Politics (1983)
- Doctoral advisor: Peter J. Katzenstein

Academic work
- Discipline: Political science
- Sub-discipline: International relations; Policy studies
- Institutions: University of California, Davis; Duke University

Bruce W. Jentleson (born June 26, 1951) is a professor of public policy and political science at Duke University, where he served from 2000 to 2005 as Director of the Terry Sanford Institute of Public Policy. He previously was a professor at the University of California, Davis and Director of the UC Davis Washington Center. In addition to his academic career, he has served in a number of foreign policy positions in Democratic administrations.

== Early life and education ==
Jentleson was born in 1951 in New York City. He grew up in Baldwin, New York. He obtained a bachelor's degree in 1973 from Cornell University. He obtained a master's degree in 1975 from the London School of Economics and Political Science (LSE). He obtained a PhD in 1983 from Cornell University.

== Career ==
Bruce W. Jentleson is William Preston Few Professor of Public Policy and Professor of Political Science at Duke University. Other positions include Global Fellow at the Woodrow Wilson International Center for Scholars (also a 2022 Distinguished Fellow in residence) and Non-Resident Senior Fellow at the Chicago Council on Global Affairs. He was the longtime co-director and now senior advisor for the Bridging the Gap project promoting greater policy engagement among academics.

Career awards include the 2018 American Political Science Association (APSA) International Security Section Joseph J. Kruzel Award for Distinguished Public Service; the 2020 Duke University Alumni Distinguished Undergraduate Teaching Award; and the 1985 APSA Harold D. Lasswell Award for his doctoral dissertation. He holds a PhD from Cornell University.

His most recent books are Economic Sanctions: What Everyone Needs to Know (Oxford University Press, 2022) and The Peacemakers: Leadership Lessons from 20th Century Statesmanship (W.W. Norton, 2018). Recent articles include “American Consensus on Ukraine Has Fractured” ForeignPolicy.com, March 29, 2023; “Will the American-Ukraine Consensus Start to Crack?” The National Interest, February 23, 2023; “Who’s Winning the Sanctions War?” ForeignPolicy.com, August 18, 2022; “Refocusing U.S. Grand Strategy on Pandemic and Environmental Mass Destruction,” The Washington Quarterly (Fall 2020); and “Be Wary of China Threat Inflation,” ForeignPolicy.com, July 30, 2021. Op-eds and blogs have been published in The Washington Post, War on the Rocks, The National Interest, The Monkey Cage, Duck of Minerva, The Hill, The Conversation, Pass Blue, Raleigh News and Observer, and elsewhere.

He has served in a number of US foreign policy positions including Senior Advisor to the State Department Policy Planning Director (2009–11), a senior foreign policy advisor to the 2000 Gore presidential campaign, in the Clinton administration State Department (1993–94), and as a foreign policy aide to Senators Gore (1987–88) and Dave Durenberger (1978–79).

Other research appointments include the 2020 Desmond Ball Visiting Chair at Australia National University, College of Asia and the Pacific; 2015-16 Henry A. Kissinger Chair in Foreign Policy and International Relations at the John W. Kluge Center, Library of Congress; Oxford University Visiting Senior Research Fellow (2007); Fulbright Senior Research Scholar, Madrid, Spain (2007); and Brookings Institution Guest Scholar (1988–90).

In 2009 he was Program Co-chair for the Annual Meeting of the American Political Science Association. He currently serves on the Editorial Boards of Political Science Quarterly, Washington Quarterly, Global R2P, and CIAO (Columbia International Affairs Online). He is co-editor of the Oxford University Press Bridging the Gap book series.

He has lectured internationally including in Australia, Brazil, Canada, China, England, France, Germany, Greece, Israel, Italy, Jordan, the Netherlands, Qatar, Spain, South Korea, Switzerland and the United Arab Emirates. He is often quoted in the press and has appeared on such shows as the PBS News Hour, BBC, Al Jazeera, al Hurra, China Radio International, and NPR, as well as regional media in the North Carolina Research Triangle.

== Personal life ==
Jentleson is married to Dr. Barbara Cooney Jentleson. He is the father of Adam Jentleson and Katherine Jentleson.

== Books ==
- Economic Sanctions: What Everyone Needs to Know (Oxford University Press, 2022).
- The Peacemakers: Leadership Lessons from Twentieth-Century Statesmanship (W.W. Norton and Company, April 2018).
- co-editor with Louis W. Pauly, Power in a Complex Global System, (Routledge, 2014).
- American Foreign Policy: The Dynamics of Choice in the 21st Century (New York: W.W. Norton and Company, 5th edition 2013, 4th edition 2010, 3rd edition 2006, 2nd edition 2004, 1st edition 2000).
- co-author with Steve Weber, The End of Arrogance: America in the Global Competition of Ideas, (Harvard University Press, 2010).
