= Shalom Hartman Institute =

Jerusalem, Israel-based think tank

- מכון שלום הרטמן
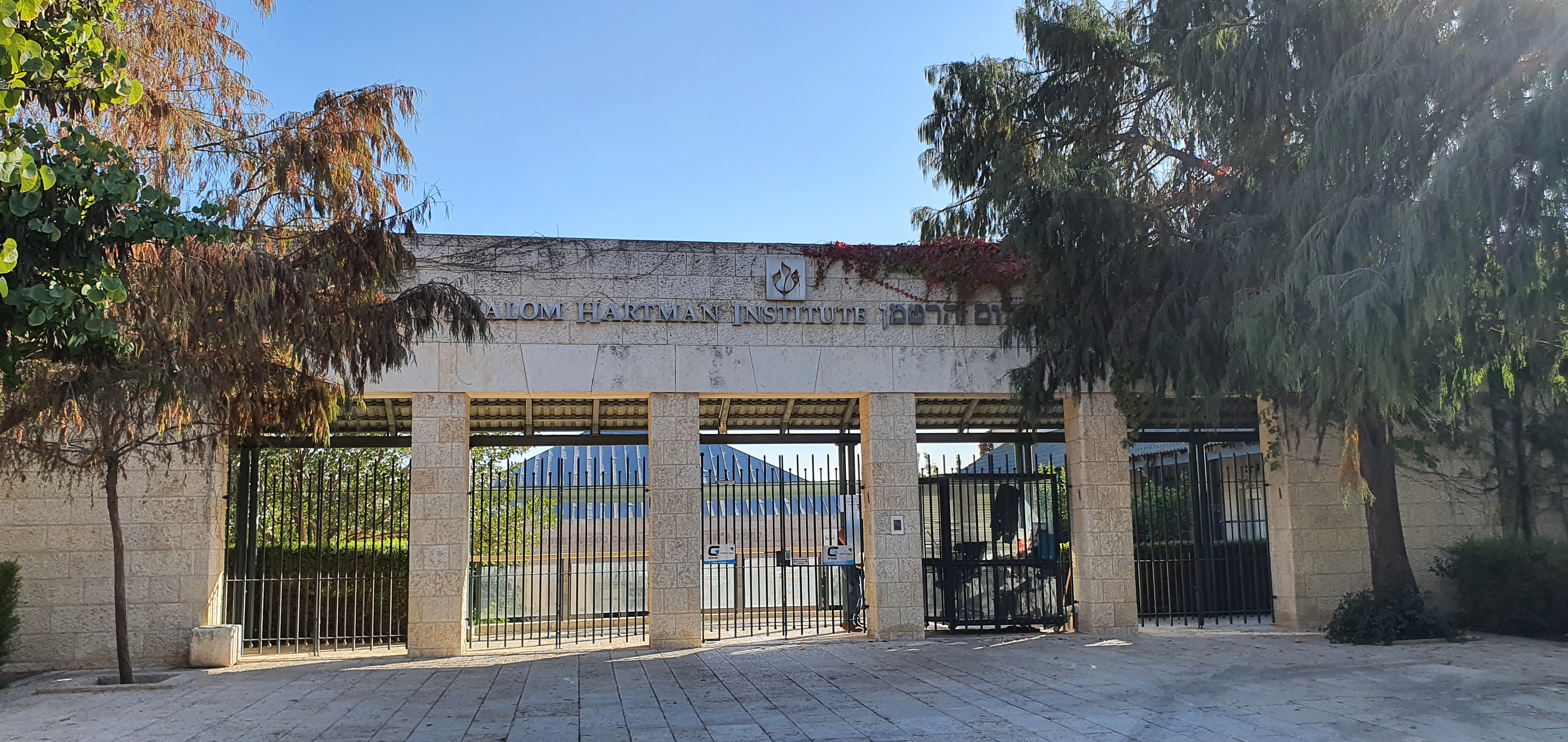
- Formation: 1976
- Founder: David Hartman
- Headquarters: 11 Gdalyahu Alon Street, Jerusalem, Israel
- Location: Jerusalem, Israel
- Presidents: Donniel Hartman; Yehuda Kurtzer
- Website: https://www.hartman.org.il

Shalom Hartman Institute is a Jewish research and education institute based in Jerusalem, that offers pluralistic Jewish thought and education to scholars, rabbis, educators, and Jewish community leaders in Israel and North America. The institute aims to promote pluralism and liberal values in Israel and the Jewish diaspora and to preserve the democratic character of Israel. Hundreds of rabbis and Jewish lay leaders from North America attend the institute's programs each year.

== History ==
Rabbi Professor David Hartman made aliyah with his family to Israel from Montreal in 1971. Rabbi Hartman's home in Jerusalem became a beit midrash for young people attracted to his philosophy. By 1976, the group moved to a local synagogue, and the Shalom Hartman Institute was born, named in memory of Hartman's father.

After operating at several locations, Teddy Kollek, former mayor of Jerusalem and a longstanding supporter of Rabbi Hartman, offered the institute more than three acres of land in the city's "Cultural Mile" which comprises the Jerusalem Theater, the L.A. Mayer Institute for Islamic Art and other cultural and educational centers and institutes.

The institute established a variety of programs for teachers, rabbis, and lay leaders. Under Rabbi Hartman and his son, Rabbi Dr. Donniel Hartman, the institute has become a training center whose programs reach thousands of participants every year. Rabbi Dov Gartenberg of Los Angeles wrote in his blog in 2005 that the institute, "enables us to reflect on cutting edge issues facing modern Judaism." In 2009, Donniel Hartman was named president of Shalom Hartman Institute, and David Hartman was named founding president. In 2010 the Shalom Hartman Institute was called "prestigious" by a website covering San Francisco Bay Area Jewish affairs.

In May 2010, Israel's opposition party leader Tzipi Livni of Kadima called upon the Hartman Institute to organize the speakers for a daylong conference at the Israeli Knesset on Jewish identity in Israel.

== Mission and funding ==
The Jerusalem-based Hartman Institute is pluralistic, liberal Zionist think tank that promotes pluralism, liberal values, and civil discourse among the Jewish community in Israel and in the diaspora. Its programs train rabbis and Jewish lay leaders in North America on promoting the "democratic character of Israel", diversity, and civil discourse.

Between 2010 and 2020, the Institute received over $25 million from the CLAWS Foundation, one of its largest donors during that period. The foundation is led by Jeffrey Yass and Arthur Dantchik, who also fund the Kohelet Policy Forum. In response to concerns about donor influence, Institute president Donniel Hartman stated that the organization sets its own agenda and should be judged by its work promoting Jewish pluralism and democratic values.

== Programs ==
=== Sources ===
In 2021, the institute launched Sources: A Journal of Jewish Ideas, a journal with long-form essays from Jewish scholars and thinkers to deal with the challenges facing the Jewish people. According to the institute, the journal aimed to fill the gap between the news-oriented Jewish media landscape and academic Jewish work. Contributors to the journal include Yale professor Christine Hayes and scholar Mijal Bitton.

The Shalom Hartman Institute-North America runs the iEngage on Campus program that educates college students on Jewish peoplehood and the relationship between the Jewish people and Israel. In 2016, the institute received a $1 million grant to expand the program to nine campuses on the West Coast of the United States over 3 years. The initiative included campus professionals, academics, and undergraduate students, who participated in training programs held in both Israel and North America.

=== Muslim Leadership Initiative ===
The Muslim Leadership Initiative (MLI) is a thirteen-month fellowship for Muslims in North America consisting of academic study, site visits in Israel and the occupied Palestinian territories, ongoing learning opportunities in the United States, and public-facing programs in the United States and Canada. While the MLI program concentrates on the Jewish experience in and through Israel, participants also engage Palestinian leaders, communities and institutions from Israel and the West Bank. The stated aim of the program is the improvement of relationships between North American Jewish and Muslim communities. However, citing its ties to the Shalom Hartman Institute, critics argue that the ultimate aim is to undermine Muslim solidarity with Palestine.

MLI is co-directed by Imam Abdullah Antepli, Public Policy Professor at Duke University, and Yossi Klein Halevi, a Senior Fellow at the Shalom Hartman Institute in Jerusalem. The two conceived of the MLI program over several years, and deliberately modeled the program, including class structure and academic themes, on existing Rabbinic and Christian leadership models already in place at the Shalom Hartman Institute. Their stated objective in designing the MLI program was to reach those large segments of mainstream North American Muslim and Jewish communities between which there are few, if any, substantive relationships; their objectives for the program furthermore indicated the hope that the MLI program would educate North American Muslims about Judaism, Zionism and Israel, but that an outcome of the program would be reciprocal. While the MLI program itself is a one-directional educational experience, public-facing programs have presented various opportunities for North American Jews to learn about North American Muslim communities and Islam.

Alumni of MLI include Wajahat Ali, Rabia Chaudry, and Haroon Moghul. Participants have written about their experience in a special series for Tablet magazine, or have been otherwise published at Tablet.

==== Criticism ====
Critics have objected strongly to Muslim participation in a program run by the Shalom Hartman Institute, which receives funding from groups in the United States that have been accused of otherwise supporting Islamophobic activities. Other critics of the program, such as Palestinian activist Ali Abunimah, argue that by running counter to the objectives of the Boycott, Divestment and Sanctions (BDS) movement, the MLI program undermines solidarity with Palestine. Further, some critics have argued that the program “faithwashes” the occupation of Palestine, transforming what is primarily a political dispute into an interfaith exercise.

The MLI program has also been supported and praised. In response to critics within the North American Muslim community, one participant in the program, Haroon Moghul, noted that MLI incorporates site visits to the West Bank, invites Palestinian leaders to address participants to further dialogue, is itself intended to challenge Islamophobia (and anti-Semitism) and does not demand advocacy of any political position, nor repudiation of any.

David Horovitz of The Times of Israel called MLI a "high-risk, taboo-shattering initiative — a vital step, they hope, toward Muslim-Jewish healing in America and beyond." Gary Rosenblatt of The Jewish Week described MLI as "a model exercise in expressing honest, often painful, views with more than just civility. The MLI members and the handful of Hartman faculty were able to convey empathy and personal affection for each other without standing down an inch from their fervent beliefs."

=== Center for Judaism and State Policy ===
The institute launched the Center for Judaism and State Policy at its Jerusalem campus in 2022 as part of a strategic partnership with the Harry Oscar Triguboff Institute. The center aimed to promote a pluralist research agenda through public advocacy, applied research, and public campaigns supporting policymakers, researchers, and activists.

=== Center for Israeli-Jewish Identity ===
The Center for Israeli-Jewish Identity focuses on pluralistic forms of contemporary Judaism for Israelis, from non-religious high school students to senior officers in the IDF. The Education Center's aim is to help Israelis learn about their Jewish heritage. The Be'eri Initiative for Pluralistic Jewish Education works with more than 50 Israeli high schools, hundreds of teachers and thousands of students. The Avi Chai Foundation, one of the Be'eri program's original funders says: "the project has had a significant positive influence on student attitudes to Jewish studies."

=== Shalom Hartman Institute-North America ===
The goal of the Shalom Hartman Institute-North America, run by its president Yehuda Kurtzer, is to strengthen Jewish communities in North America. SHI North America runs programs and seminars across the US and Canada.

The Institute runs a three-year program for North American rabbis that one participant described as: "one of the blessings of my rabbinate."

In July 2012, the Shalom Hartman Institute began a partnership with Hillel: The Foundation for Jewish Life on Campus, called the Fellowship for Campus Professionals. The program brings Hartman Fellows to campuses in America in order to discuss and teach about the Jewish relationship with Israel.

In August, Hartman runs an annual student leadership summit; students, who are nominated by their university, gather to discuss issues, such as how to become a leader in one's Jewish community on campus.

== Notable people ==
- Diplomatic advisor and international law expert Tal Becker, Vice President
- Author and commentator Yossi Klein Halevi, Senior Fellow
- American diplomat Amos Hochstein, alumnus
