= Yesha Council =

Group of councils of Jewish settlements in the West Bank

- מועצת יש"ע
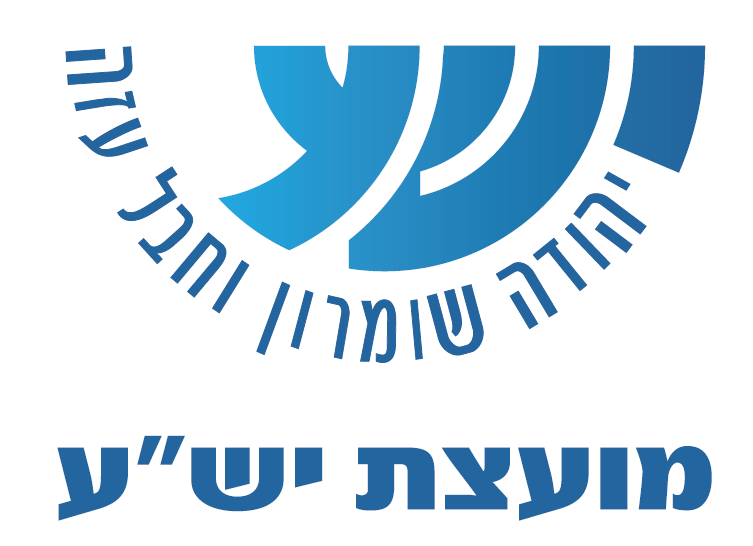
- Named after: Yesha
- Predecessor: Gush Emunim
- Formation: 24 December 1980; 45 years ago
- Founder: Yisrael Harel
- Headquarters: Sha'ar Binyamin Industrial Zone
- Region served: Judea and Samaria Area
- Chairman: Israel Ganz
- CEO: Omer Rahamim
- Affiliations: Amana
- Website: www.myesha.org.il

The Yesha Council (Hebrew: מועצת יש"ע, Mo'etzet Yesha) is an umbrella organization of municipal councils of Jewish settlements in the West Bank (and formerly in the Gaza Strip). The Hebrew acronym Yesha is created from Yehuda Shomron, Aza (Judea, Samaria, Gaza).

As of 2024, the chairman of the Yesha Council is Israel Ganz, and Omer Rahamim is CEO.

== History ==
The council was founded in the 1980s as the successor to Gush Emunim ("Bloc of the Faithful"), a Religious Zionist movement advocating Jewish settlement in territories captured by Israel in the 1967 Six-Day War, that is, the West Bank and Gaza Strip. They regarded this as the return of Jews to their Biblical homeland. Gush Emunim became a formal organization after the 1973 Yom Kippur War. Yisrael Harel was active in this movement, and was a co-founder of the Yesha Foundation as well as founder editor of Nekuda, a monthly journal for Israeli settlers. (Note: In2019, Harel was a columnist for the daily newspaper Haaretz.) The name of the organization, "Mo'etzet Yesha", is the Hebrew acronym for Yehuda Shomron, Aza (Judea, Samaria, Gaza).

Pinchas Wallerstein was head of the Yesha Council after Harel.

Yesha Council's resettlement policy was criticised by the 2005 Sasson Report, an official Israeli government report commissioned by the Prime Minister Ariel Sharon. The report found that settlers had constructed 105 illegal outposts, over half of which were built on land that did not belong to the state, in collusion with government ministries and other public bodies.

In 2012, IRIN News reported that the Yesha Council, along with the regional councils, were focusing more on advocacy. Among other activities, they arranged talks by politicians, and aimed to attract Israelis to the settlements through tourism and volunteering.

In October 1999, Yesha Council came to an agreement with the government under prime minister Ehud Barak to dismantle some of the settlements. This met with opposition from a group of young religious Zionist activists called Dor Hemshech, ("the Continuing Generation"), who lay down in front of bulldozers sent to do the work in protest.

In 2009, council chairman Dani Dayan said that settlers must not use violence to advance their means. He said that such actions were "morally bankrupt" and only serve to "hinder the settlers' struggle."

From 2008 until 2010, Pinchas Wallerstein, who was seen as a moderate by some because he had been critical of extremists attacking Palestinian villages, served as director of the Yesha Council. He resigned in January 2010 after falling out with Dani Dayan. He said, however, "the differences between us are more about quantity and timing and less about issues of essential content". The secretary-general of Israeli pacifist organization Peace Now, Yariv Oppenheimer, said that Wallerstein was no moderate, having been a major force behind the illegal expansion of settlements.

In 2019, Yesha Council was presided over by chairman Hananel Dorani and CEO Yigal Dilmoni. They planned to double the Jewish population of "Judea and Samaria" (then 450,000) to a million, within ten years: Hazon Ha-Million – the "vision of one million". Dorani believes that they need to "fight for full Israeli independence from the United States", so that foreign leaders are not able to influence Israeli policies with regard to the settler communities in the West Bank.

In May 2023, Yesha reported that by October 2022 over half a million Israeli settlers were living in the West Bank, which comprised 5.2 percent of the total population of Israel. The growth rate of the settler population was around 2.2% in 2022, with 10,755 Israelis moving to West Bank communities. The settlers are overseen by the military and the Defense Ministry, as this territory is not officially a part of Israel.

== Aims and description ==
The stated aims of the Yesha Council are "to promote Israeli communities in Judea, Samaria (Note: The West Bank) and the Jordan Valley as the heart of the Bible Land and the birthplace of the Jewish people and its heritage". They want to see Israeli sovereignty in the West Bank.

Their stated strategic objectives are:

- To secure the borders of the State of Israel
- To safeguard Israel's strategic expanses–between the Jordan River and the Mediterranean Sea
- To ensure Israel's right to the Land by strengthening Israeli settlement in Judea, Samaria, and the Jordan Valley

The Council aims to assert Israeli sovereignty, to develop transport and other infrastructure, to increase tourism from all over the world, and "to prevent the establishment of a Palestinian state between the Jordan River and the Mediterranean Sea". It also aims to create master plans for the whole area.

In addition to municipal and security issues, the Council serves as the political arm of the Jewish residents of Yesha. The Council lobbies for their interests with the Knesset and the government. It also carries on public relations campaigns for the settlements and organizes public protests.

== Governance and organisation ==
The Yesha Council's headquarters are in the Ramat Eshkol neighbourhood of Jerusalem.

The Yesha Council consists of 25 elected mayors who represent municipalities with an Israeli population of around 500,000 people, and is headed by an elected chairman. Israel Ganz was elected chairman in May 2024. Omer Rahamim was appointed CEO in June 2024.

Chairman/director	Dates in office	Other public positions
Yisrael Harel	1980–1995	Founder of the Yesha Council, founder of Institute for Zionist Strategies
Pinchas Wallerstein	1995–1999	Head of the Mateh Binyamin Regional Council
Benny Kashriel	1999–2001	Mayor of Ma'ale Adumim
Benzi Lieberman	2002–2007	Head of the Samaria Regional Council
Dani Dayan	2009–2010	Pinchas Wallerstein as director-general until resignation Nov. 2010
Naftali Bennett	2010–2012	(director) In 2021, 13th Prime Minister of Israel
Dani Dayan	2013–2017	Head of the Mateh Binyamin Regional Council and later Consul General of Israel in New York and Yad Vashem chairman
Hananel Dorani	2017–2019	Chairman of the Kedumim Regional Council
David Elhayani	2019–2022	Head of the Jordan Valley Regional Council
Shlomo Ne'eman	2022–2024	Head of the Gush Etzion Regional Council
Israel Ganz	2024–	Head of the Mateh Binyamin Regional Council

== Activism ==
=== 2005 protests ===
In July 2005, when Ariel Sharon was prime minister, the Knesset voted against delaying its withdrawal of troops and settlers from all 21 Gaza settlements, as well as four of the 120 in the West Bank, due to start the following month. The Yesha Council, led by chairman Bentzi Lieberman, led a protest campaign against this decision. Around 6,000 protesters led by ultranationalist rabbis marched from the town of Netivot in southern Israel to the village of Kfar Maimon in an illegal protest, after the government had banned all non-residents from entering Gaza. After three days, the protesters left the village. In Tel Aviv there was a rally of around 150,000 protesters.

=== Wikipedia editing (2010) ===
In August 2010, it was reported that the Yesha Council, then under director Naftali Bennett, had joined My Israel (Israel Sheli), a network of online pro-Israel activists committed to spreading Zionism online, in their efforts to organize people at a workshop in Jerusalem to teach them how to edit Wikipedia articles in a pro-Israeli way. Around 50 people took part in the course. The project organiser, Ayelet Shaked, of Israel Sheli, said in a radio interview that the information had to be reliable and meet Wikipedia rules. She cited some examples such as the use of the term "occupation" in Wikipedia entries, as well as in the editing of entries that link Israel with Judea and Samaria and Jewish history. One participant said that it was not a "Zionist conspiracy to take over Wikipedia", but an attempt to add balance to articles about disputed issues.

=== Push for full sovereignty ===
During a celebration of the 50th anniversary of Ofra, in 2025, council leaders reportedly told visiting Benjamin Netanyahu, "Now is the time to move from words to deeds. Not partial sovereignty only in the settlement blocs, but full sovereignty over all of Judea and Samaria. This is the order of the day—Jewish, historical, moral and security-related."

== See also ==
- Israeli Civil Administration
- Israeli settlement
- Judea and Samaria Area
- Population statistics for Israeli West Bank settlements
