= Yehuda Kurtzer =

American Jewish public intellectual (born 1977)

- Born: January 7, 1977 (age 49); Takoma Park, Maryland, U.S.
- Education: Columbia University (BA); Brown University (MA); Harvard University (PhD)
- Spouse: Stephanie Ives
- Children: 3
- Father: Daniel Kurtzer

Yehuda Kurtzer (born January 7, 1977) is president of the Shalom Hartman Institute. He has written and lectured widely on Jewish history, Jewish memory, leadership in American Jewish life, and the relationship between American Jews, Israel and Zionism. In 2012, he was named one of the "36 under 36 young educators, thinkers, social justice activists, philanthropists and artists reinventing Jewish life" by The Jewish Week.

== Early life and education ==
Kurtzer was raised as a Modern Orthodox Jew in Tel Aviv, Israel and Silver Spring, Maryland. He is a son of U.S. Ambassador Daniel Kurtzer.

He studied religion and history at Columbia College of Columbia University as an undergraduate student and graduated in 2000. He began graduate study at Brown University in early Christianity, but left that program after a year, later entering the Ph.D. program in Near Eastern Languages and Civilizations at Harvard University. He completed his doctoral degree in Jewish Studies there in 2008.

== Career ==
Kurtzer was named the first Charles R. Bronfman Visiting Chair of Jewish Communal Innovation at Brandeis University in 2008, where he taught Jewish Studies as part of a Jewish professional leadership program. The position was awarded after Kurtzer won a public competition for funding to write a book that would "change the way Jews think about themselves and their community." Kurtzer's proposal became his book, Shuva: The future of the Jewish past. In 2020, Kurtzer and Dr. Claire Sufrin co-edited The New Jewish Canon, a collection of Jewish debates and ideas from 1980 to 2015.

He led the creation of the Shalom Hartman Institute of North America in 2010, and then became president of this organization. Under his direction, the organization has expanded to a staff of 28 employees in Chicago, Boston, San Francisco, and Los Angeles, with public programs and activities reaching over 10,000 people per year. Its activities focus on leadership and educational programs for rabbis and lay leaders of the Jewish community.

In 2023, Kurtzer was named co-president of the Shalom Hartman Institute, sharing the role with Rabbi Donniel Hartman.

Kurtzer also hosts Identity Crisis, a podcast focused on Jewish news and ideas.

He has been a scholar-in-residence and speaker in many American Jewish communities on topics including contemporary Jewish life, Zionism and partisanship.

=== Books ===
- Kurtzer, Yehuda (2012). Shuva: The Future of the Jewish Past. Brandeis University Press. hdl:10192/31473.
- Kurtzer, Yehuda; Sufrin, Claire (July 2020). The New Jewish Canon. Archived from the original on 2021-11-25.
