= Kohelet Policy Forum =

Israeli right-wing think tank

Kohelet Policy Forum פורום קהלת
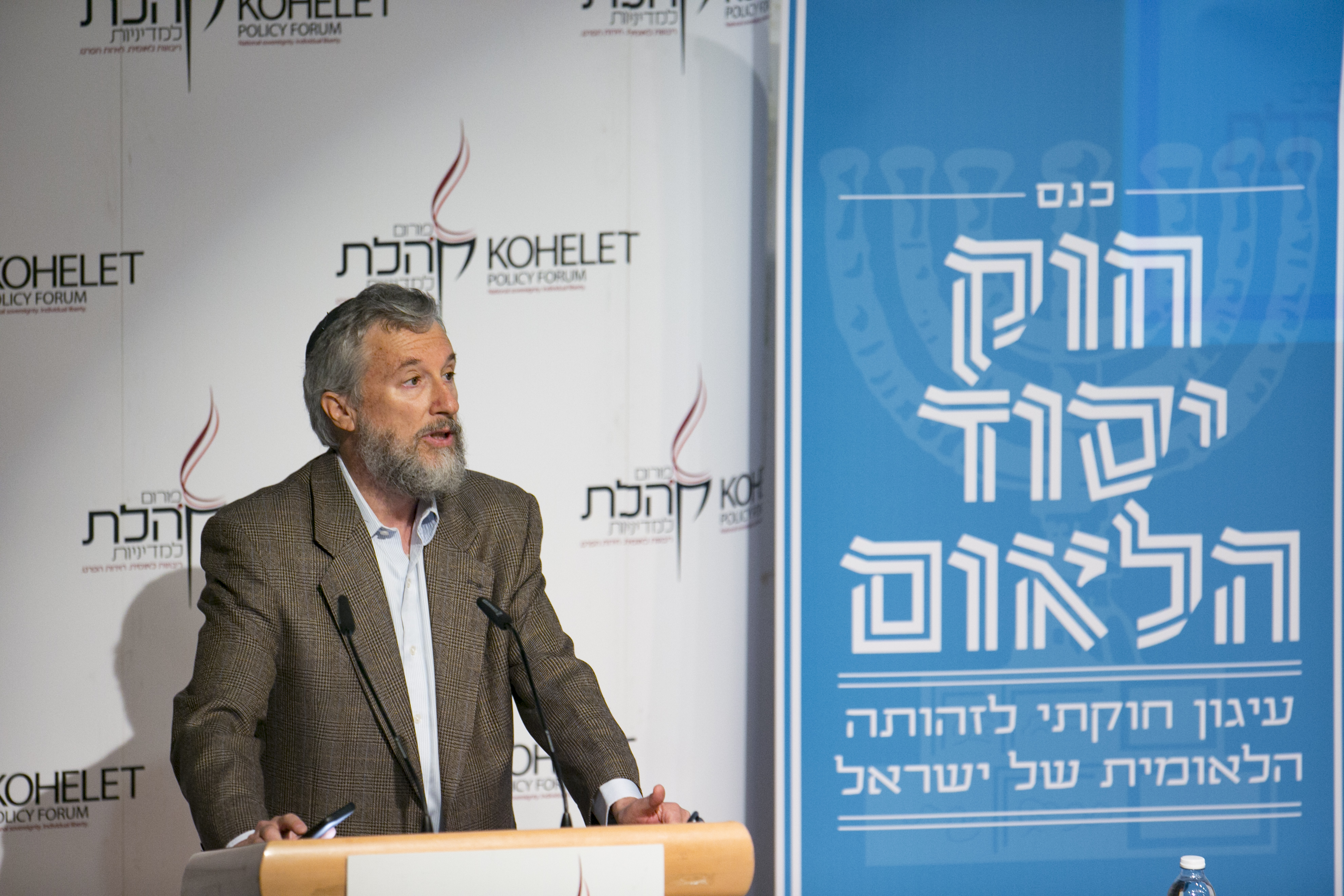
- Formation: 2012
- Type: Public policy think tank
- Headquarters: Am Ve'olamo 8
- Location: Jerusalem
- Chairman: Moshe Koppel
- Website: Kohelet.org.il

The Kohelet Policy Forum (KPF or Kohelet; Hebrew: פורום קהלת) is a conservative, libertarian, right-wing Israeli nonprofit think tank established in 2012 and run by founder and chair Moshe Koppel alongside Avraham Diskin, Avi Bell and Eugene Kontorovich. Its goal is to influence government policies within Israel.

In 2023, the organization rose to prominence for its involvement in advocating for judicial reform in Israel and its publication of many of the policy papers that underpin the 2023 Israeli judicial reform. Amid the controversy, which has seen KPF lose its main donor, the organization has attempted to soften its public position on judicial reform. Due to the loss of donations, in April 2024, KPF announced that it would cut about half its staff. However, as there is a significant overlap between KPF and the Misgav Institute for National Security and Zionist Strategy, it is difficult to determine whether or not this is a form of rebranding.

== Organization ==
Established in January 2012 by Moshe Koppel, KPF is a religiously conservative, libertarian, right-wing Israeli nonprofit think tank. It is chaired by Koppel and run together with Israeli academics such as Avraham Diskin, Avi Bell and Eugene Kontorovich. According to Dahlia Scheindlin, KPF modeled itself after the Federalist Society.

=== Funding ===
According to its own account, KPF is a non-governmental organization which relies only on private donations and does not accept public funds from any government, domestic or foreign. The largest donations have been made anonymously, and amount to several million dollars sent through an American nonprofit organization called American Friends of Kohelet Policy Forum.

An investigative article published at Haaretz said that the principal donors to the Forum are Jewish American billionaires Jeff Yass and Arthur Dantchik. This has been disputed by acquaintances of Yass who state that he has never been a donor to Kohelet.

=== Network ===
Alongside its think tank role, KPF or its former researchers have founded various organizations, including the Shiloh Policy Forum, a settlement organisation for which KPF pays the salaries of three staff members. The Civil Society Forum is also connected to the KPF, and the Israeli Immigration Policy Center has worked alongside it. KPF has also trained anti-LGBTQ groups.

Both founders of "Next Generation – Parents for Choice in Education" are also KPF researchers, while several other NGOs, including "Coalition for Autonomy in Education", "Choosing Educations", "Tacharut – the Movement for Freedom of Employment" (which works against Histadrut), "Our Interest – Your Lobby", and "Hamerchav Shelanu" ("Our Space"), are also linked to KPF.

In February 2023, Kohelet research fellow Avital Ben-Shelomo became director general of the Education Ministry of Israel.

== Policy positions ==
=== Constitutional ===
KPF has promoted the Nation-State Bill. It has also filed Amicus curiae briefs in a number of appeals.

==== Judicial reform ====
KPF worked on policy papers which underpin the attempted 2023 Israeli judicial reform, which involves giving the government control over judicial appointments, limiting judicial review of laws and government decisions, an "override clause" which is intended to allow the Knesset to overrule supreme court decisions with a majority of 61 out of 120 votes, and limiting the authority of the government and ministerial legal advisors.

KPF's Michael Sarel came out strongly against the 2023 Judicial reform in Israel, and in a personal position paper which he clarified does not reflect KPF's position, said that it can cause damage to the separation of powers and even threaten free elections, and warned of severe economic consequences. Following Sarel's criticism, Tom Sadeh, an economic researcher at KPF, resigned, saying "The differences of opinion regarding the judicial reform between me and the Forum do not allow me to continue working in it wholeheartedly."

On 9 March 2023, in a self-proclaimed "guerilla operation", members of the "Brothers In Arms" (Hebrew: אחים לנשק), leading the Reservists Protests as part of the 2023 Israeli judicial reform protests, in a demonstration that included around a hundred people, blocked the entrance to the Kohelet Policy Forum offices in Givat Shaul with sandbags and barbed wire stating that "everyone knows that Kohelet is hurting the economy and the security of Israel". On 14 March, Koppel suggested that the override clause should be dropped, but supported the other controversial proposals.

On 26 July 2023, Yuval Diskin, former head of the Shin Bet, published a ten point plan to combat the judicial overhaul plan, in which he identified the KPF as one of the main drivers of the proposed plan. He wrote: "We should focus our messaging on our true rivals: the supporters of a messianic, Kahanist and racist State of Judea and the Kohelet organization, with a clear goal of thwarting their plans to alter the essence of our democracy and our country". In July 2023, amid the judicial reform protests, KPF came under criticism for allegedly using sock puppet accounts to skew its Wikipedia page, which it has claimed was done by an employee without the consent or knowledge of KPF.

On 4 August 2023, the Israeli newspaper Calcalist reported that Dantchik decided to stop donating to KPF, following protests by Israelis in the Philadelphia region against him. Dantchik's donations are conjectured to account for 93% of KPF's budget. Following Arthur Dantchik's announcement, Channel 12 news reported that senior members of KPF met with ministers and members of the Knesset from the coalition in order to try to convince them to pause the legislation concerning the judicial overhaul, claiming that at this point it is causing more damage than good.

=== Socioeconomic ===
The forum supports a libertarian approach to economic policy, and promotes free-market principles in Israel, including deregulation, reducing the scope of government and eliminating impediments to free trade like tariffs, quotas and licensing requirements.

One of the reports published by the forum in 2018 criticized the benefits allotted to single-parent households in Israel, claiming that they constitute an economic incentive to women to become single mothers. The report suggested that these benefits should be reduced or eliminated, and that single mothers should be encouraged to work more and rely less on the state.
