= Arie van Os =

Dutch businessman and financial director

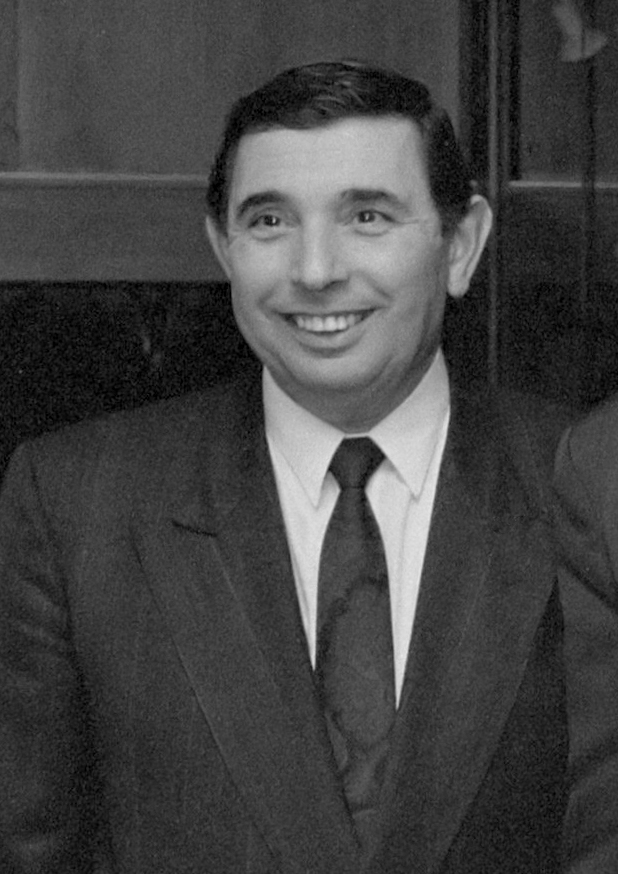
- Van Os in 1989
- Born: 1937 (age 88–89); Amsterdam, Netherlands
- Occupation: Businessman

Arie van Os (born 1937) is a Dutch businessman and financial director.

== Career ==
Arie van Os made his fortune as a partner of the company Van der Moolen. In the eighties he was the director and chairman of the Amsterdam Stock Exchange, together with his then flamboyant partner Hans Kroon.

In 1989 he became the financial director of AFC Ajax where his reputation grew. He then spent three days in jail due to a tight policy on alleged tax malpractice on behalf of the club with the transfers of Michael Laudrup and Shota Arveladze.

His position at the club was then succeeded by Ajax banker Hein Blocks.
