= Moshe Koppel =

American-Israeli computer scientist (born 1956)

- משה קופל
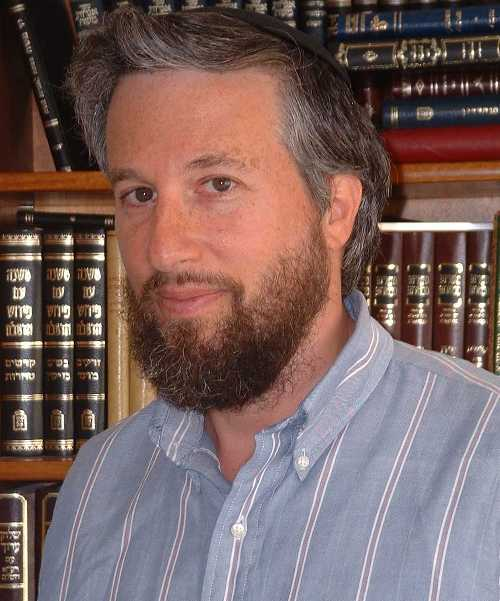
- Born: 1956 (age 69–70); New York, United States
- Education: New York University
- Scientific career
- Fields: Computer science
- Workplaces: Bar-Ilan University
- Doctoral advisor: Martin Davis

Moshe Koppel (Hebrew: משה קופל; born 1956) is an American-Israeli computer scientist, Talmud scholar, political activist and the founder of the Kohelet Policy Forum. He is well known for his research on authorship attribution. Together with Shlomo Argamon and Jonathan Schler, he has shown that statistical analysis of word usage in a document can be used to determine an author's gender, age, native language, and personality type.

== Biography ==
Koppel was born and raised in New York, where he received a traditional Jewish education. He studied at Yeshivat Har Etzion in Israel, received a B.A. from Yeshiva University, and, in 1979, completed his doctorate in mathematics under the supervision of Martin Davis at the Courant Institute of New York University. He spent a post-doctoral year at the Institute for Advanced Study in Princeton before moving to Israel in 1980. He has been a member of the Bar-Ilan University Department of Computer Science since then.

== Research ==
=== Computer science ===
Koppel is best known for his research on authorship attribution. Together with Shlomo Engelson Argamon and Jonathan Schler, he has shown that statistical analysis of word usage in a document can be used to determine an author's gender, age, native language and personality type. The findings regarding gender generated considerable controversy.

In a string of papers, Koppel and colleagues solved many of the main problems in authorship, including authorship verification and authorship attribution with huge open candidate sets.

In recent years, Koppel has published several papers in social choice theory, offering (in joint work with Avraham Diskin) formal definitions of a number of concepts, including disproportionality, and voting power the definitions of which had been the subject of controversy. In related work, Koppel and colleagues have shown how the wisdom of crowds could be optimally exploited.

Along with Nathan Netanyahu and Omid David, Koppel showed that, using only records of games played by grandmasters, a chess program could be trained essentially from scratch to play at grandmaster level. A program designed by Omid David based on these ideas placed second in the speed chess competition in the 2008 World Computer Chess Championship.

=== Talmud ===
Koppel has written two books on the Talmud. Meta-Halakhah showed how ideas formalized in mathematical logic could be used to explicate how the ancient Rabbis understood the unfolding of Jewish law. Seder Kinnim is a mathematical commentary on Tractate Kinnim, generally regarded as the most difficult tractate in the Mishna.

Koppel wrote a monograph on the uses of concepts in probability theory for understanding Rabbinic decision methods. Together with Ely Merzbach, he founded and edited the journal Higayon that is devoted to related topics.

Koppel's interest in the Talmud is occasionally reflected in his computer science research. He has applied his authorship attribution methods to proving that the 19th century Baghdadi rabbi known as Ben Ish Chai was the actual author of a book for which he did not take credit. Koppel also showed that the Harson collection (Hebrew: הגניזה החרסונית), a trove of letters attributed to early Hassidic masters were in fact all forgeries.

Koppel has also developed methods for automated authorship analysis of biblical texts.

== Political activism ==
Koppel has been active in efforts to draft a formal constitution for the State of Israel, intended to replace the quasi-constitutional system of Basic Laws from which the government derives its powers. He participated in meetings of the Knesset's Constitution Committee under the chairmanship of Member of Knesset Michael Eitan during the 16th Knesset and prepared the drafts for the committee's work on religion and state. Subsequently, he co-authored a draft of a complete constitution proposed by the Institute for Zionist Strategies. Later, he and Eitan co-authored another complete draft of a constitution. He also wrote legislation passed by the Knesset in February 2011 that required full disclosure by NGOs regarding funding received from foreign governments. In February 2012, Koppel founded the Kohelet Policy Forum, a Jerusalem-based conservative-libertarian think tank.
