= David Hartman =

David Hartman is the name of:

- David Hartman (rabbi) (1931–2013), American-Israeli rabbi
- David Hartman (TV personality) (born 1935), American journalist
