= Arthur Dantchik =

American businessman and philanthropist

- Born: 1957 (age 68–69)
- Education: Binghamton University; Arizona State University
- Occupation: Businessman
- Known for: Co-founder of Susquehanna International Group
- Board member of: ByteDance

Arthur Dantchik (born 1957) is an American billionaire businessman and philanthropist who is a co-founder and the managing director of Susquehanna International Group, a Bala Cynwyd, Pennsylvania-based financial services firm founded in 1987. As of September 2026, Dantchik's net worth was estimated at $19.5 billion.

Dantchik is a member of the board of directors of ByteDance, the Chinese parent company of social media website TikTok.

== Early life ==
Dantchik was educated at Bayside High School and attended the State University of New York At Binghamton, where he met Jeff Yass, Steve Bloom, Eric Brooks, Andrew Frost, and Joel Greenberg, who would be his co-founders of Susquehanna International Group (SIG). Dantchik and Yass were roommates. He is of Jewish descent.

== Business career ==
In 1987, the six friends from SUNY-Binghamton co-founded SIG. Dantchik serves as SIG's managing director and executive committee member, overseeing the firm's global private equity, venture capital investments, commodity trading business, and international activities. As of 2022, Dantchik owns around 19% of Susquehanna.

Dantchik helped SIG establish SIG Asia Investments, its China-based venture capital arm, in 2004. SIG Asia Investments was an early investor in ByteDance, the Chinese parent company of social media website TikTok, in 2012. Dantchik sits on Bytedance's board of directors as SIG's representative. SIG owned around 15% of ByteDance as of late 2020, making SIG the largest outside investor in the company.

== Philanthropy ==
Dantchik founded the CLAWS Foundation to support his philanthropic goals. It has been described as "low profile" and does not accept unsolicited proposals. The foundation backs a number of libertarian causes in the United States and Israel. It is also active in giving to local causes in Philadelphia, such as the Philadelphia Museum of Art and the Children's Hospital of Philadelphia.

The CLAWS Foundation has been a major donor to the Institute for Justice, a libertarian public interest law firm, libertarian think tank Cato Institute, and Ron Paul-linked Students for Liberty.

The foundation has also been active in supporting causes in Israel. Between 2010 and 2020, the foundation gave more than $25 million to the Shalom Hartman Institute, a Jerusalem-based Jewish research and education institute, making the foundation one of the institute's largest donors. It also provided funding to the Israeli think tank Kohelet Policy Forum, a driving force behind the 2023 Israeli judicial reform. The controversial reform push faced significant opposition in Israel, and Dantchik announced on August 4, 2023, that he would no longer make donations to think tanks in Israel. In a statement, Dantchik said that "it is most critical at this time for Israel to focus on healing and national unity.”

== Personal life ==
Dantchik maintains a low profile and has never given an interview. He is single, and lives in Gladwyne, Pennsylvania.
