= The Shallows (film) =

2016 film by Jaume Collet-Serra

- Theatrical release poster
- Directed by: Jaume Collet-Serra
- Written by: Anthony Jaswinski
- Produced by: Lynn Harris; Matti Leshem
- Starring: Blake Lively
- Cinematography: Flavio Labiano
- Edited by: Joel Negron
- Music by: Marco Beltrami
- Production companies: Columbia Pictures; Weimaraner Republic Pictures; Ombra Films
- Distributed by: Sony Pictures Releasing
- Release dates: June 21, 2016 (New York City); June 24, 2016 (United States)
- Running time: 86 minutes
- Country: United States
- Language: English
- Budget: $13–17 million
- Box office: $119.1 million

The Shallows is a 2016 American survival horror film directed by Jaume Collet-Serra, written by Anthony Jaswinski, and starring Blake Lively. In the film, medical student Nancy Adams gets stranded 200 yards (180 m) from shore and must use her wits and determination to survive a great white shark attack. Principal photography began in October 2015 in New South Wales and Queensland, Australia.

The film was released in the United States on June 24, 2016, by Columbia Pictures. The film received generally positive reviews and grossed over $119 million against a production budget in the range of $13 to $17 million, becoming a box office success.

== Plot ==
Shortly after the death of her mother from cancer, medical student Nancy Adams travels to a secluded beach in Mexico, the same one her mother visited while she was pregnant with her. Carlos, a friendly local resident, gives her a ride and drops her off alone at the beach, as her friend who came along with her is staying back at their hotel, recovering from excessive partying.

Nancy joins two other locals already in the water, and the three surf for several hours. Taking a break from surfing, she video-chats with her younger sister, Chloe. When she talks to her father in an emotional and strained conversation, it is revealed that Nancy is a senior student, but her mother's recent death has caused her to consider dropping out of medical school before graduation.

While surfing one last time for the day, Nancy notices the carcass of a young humpback whale nearby. When she gets on the waves to return to the beach, a large shark knocks her off the surfboard. She is thrown into the water and hits the reef several times. She floats, but then the shark bites her leg. Nancy manages to reach and climb onto the whale carcass, but the shark rams it from underneath. She is knocked off, but is able to swim to a nearby isolated rock. She uses her surfboard leash as a makeshift tourniquet to slow the bleeding from her leg. Later, she uses her jewelry as rudimentary stitches for the wound and the sleeve of her wetsuit as a compression bandage.

Nancy is left stranded when the unsuspecting locals leave the beach, forcing her to spend the night on the rock. There, she is joined by a wounded gull that has also been injured by the shark, which she jokingly names Steven Seagull. The following morning, Nancy manages to attract the attention of a drunken local man on the beach. However, rather than helping her, he simply waves before discovering her backpack and stealing some of her belongings. When he wades into the water to retrieve her surfboard, he is attacked and killed by the shark. Several hours later, the two locals Nancy had surfed with the previous day return to the beach. Despite her desperate attempts to warn them of the danger, they enter the water and are both killed by the shark.

One of the local surfers was wearing a GoPro camera on his helmet and when the shark attacked him, the helmet came off and floated to the surface. Nancy later sees it floating in the water, and after some struggles, in which both she and the shark are injured by stinging coral, she is able to retrieve it. While watching recorded footage of the shark's attack, Nancy notices the shark has a large hook stuck in its mouth, possibly from an encounter with fishermen. She uses the GoPro to record messages for her sister and father, as well as information about the shark attack, her injuries, and her location, and throws it back into the water.

With high tide approaching, Nancy realizes the small rock she is on will soon be submerged. After sending Steven Seagull toward shore on a piece of the surfboard, and timing the shark's circles from the whale carcass to the rock, Nancy swims to a nearby buoy, narrowly avoiding the shark by swimming through a group of jellyfish, which sting both the shark and her.

Nancy finds a flare gun on the buoy and shoots flares to draw the attention of a faraway cargo ship. However, it has already turned away and does not see her. Nancy then fires another flare at the shark, setting the oil from the whale carcass alight. This causes the shark to ferociously attack the buoy, ripping out the chains securing it to the ocean bed. Nancy straps herself to the last remaining chain and, as it is ripped from the buoy, she is pulled down to the ocean floor, pursued by the shark. At the last moment, she pulls out of the dive, and the shark is impaled on rebar protruding from the buoy's anchor.

Later, a boy named Miguel (from the opening of the film at the beach) finds the GoPro on the beach and watches Nancy's recorded messages. He runs off and returns with his father, who is revealed to be Carlos. Miguel spots Nancy floating close to shore, and Carlos brings her ashore and revives her. As she recovers consciousness, she briefly sees a hallucination of her mother. As she looks around the beach, she sees that Steven Seagull has also made it to shore.

One year later, a healed Nancy (now graduated as a doctor) and her sister go surfing in Galveston, Texas, as their father tells Nancy that her mother would have been very proud of her for not giving up.

== Cast ==
- Blake Lively as Nancy Adams
  - Ava Dean as young Nancy Adams
- Óscar Jaenada as Carlos
- Brett Cullen as Mr. Adams
- Sedona Legge as Chloe Adams
- Pablo Calva as Boy, Carlos' son
- Janelle Bailey as Mrs. Adams
  - Chelsea Moody as young Mrs. Adams
- Sully Seagull as Sully 'Steven' Seagull
- Angelo Josue Lozano Corzo as Bi-lingual Surfer
- Joseph Salas as Portuguese-speaking Surfer
- Diego Espejel as Intoxicated Man

== Production ==
Initially, Louis Leterrier was to direct, though he dropped out in June 2015, leading to Jaume Collet-Serra being considered for the job. Collet-Serra viewed the movie as one about survival and noted "this isn't a creature movie". Likewise from the very beginning Collet-Serra decided not to place an emphasis on gore. Blake Lively joined the cast in August 2015. Lively was partly inspired by her husband Ryan Reynolds's work in the similarly minimalist film Buried, stating "that was one of the reasons why I wanted to take on this movie so much, because I know how tough that was for him and how rewarding it was."

For the seagull character of Steven Seagull, the usage of both CGI and a puppet was considered based on the belief that it would be inordinately hard to train such a bird to act. This "horrified" both producers, Matti Leshem and Lynn Harris, who wanted to work with an actual animal. While scouting for a location in Australia, Lively was able to feed a group of seagulls, at which point it was realized that it would be possible to use them for production. The initial script featured Lively talking to the bird much more, and likewise, scenes featuring such an interaction were shot. However, in the end, Collet-Serra decided on a less-is-more approach, noting that "...we didn't want her to be like Snow White talking to animals. When you see her predicament, you get it. You don't need her to explain everything to a seagull!"

=== Filming ===
Principal photography began on October 28, 2015, in New South Wales, Australia. Filming also took place at Lord Howe Island, Mount Tamborine, Queensland and Village Roadshow Studios. It originally was going to be filmed on the Gulf Coast of the United States near Galveston, but the filmmakers were denied a film permit for safety reasons. Filming wrapped on January 15, 2016.

Much of the film was shot in a tank using bluescreens for effects. Still, Collet-Serra wanted to avoid the "more stylized look" of similar films using the setup and estimated that 10% of the film was shot on location in order to "trick" the audience into believing the setting was real: he explains: "Every scene has one shot that is real, and the other 99% is not – but the one real shot tricks you". The shark was made entirely through computer-generated imagery, which was only completed close to the start of the marketing campaign for the film. /Film noted that the use of CGI was unusual for Collet-Serra, as he typically used practical effects as opposed to the digital ones required by the shoot. Kelly Richardson was the lead stunt double in all the action scenes in the film, and Isabella Nichols was the lead surf double. Lively ended up performing a few of her own stunts, including a scene where her character breaks her nose and has an actual injury.

== Release ==
The Shallows was originally supposed to be released on June 29, 2016, but to avoid The Purge: Election Year and their second weekend being on the holiday of July 4, the film was instead released on Friday, June 24, 2016, by Columbia Pictures.

=== Home media ===
Sony Pictures Home Entertainment released the film for digital download on September 13, 2016, and was released on DVD, Blu-ray and Ultra HD Blu-ray on September 27, 2016.

=== Box office ===
The Shallows grossed $55.1 million in North America and $64 million in other territories for a worldwide total of $119.1 million, against a budget of $13–17 million.

The film opened on June 24, 2016, alongside Independence Day: Resurgence and Free State of Jones, and was projected to gross around $7 million from 2,800 theaters in its opening weekend, with some estimates going as high as $11–12 million. The film grossed $1.3 million from Thursday night previews and $6.8 million on its first day. In its opening weekend, the film grossed $16.7 million, finishing fourth at the box office behind Finding Dory ($73.2 million), Independence Day: Resurgence ($41.6 million) and Central Intelligence ($18.4 million). This was nearly double the expectations of the studio, with Josh Greenstein, Sony president of worldwide marketing and distribution, saying, "We had the best-reviewed new movie of the weekend and combined with a great audience response saw a fantastic result. People wanted to watch a film with quality that was original in this summer landscape."

=== Critical response ===
The Shallows received generally positive reviews from critics, with Lively's performance being praised. On Rotten Tomatoes, the film has an approval rating of 78% based on 220 reviews with an average rating of 6.50/10. The website's critical consensus reads, "Lean and solidly crafted, The Shallows transcends tired shark-attack tropes with nasty thrills and a powerful performance from Blake Lively." On Metacritic, the film has a score of 59 out of 100 based on 35 critics, indicating "mixed or average reviews". Audiences polled by CinemaScore gave the film an average grade of "B+" on an A+ to F scale.

Richard Roeper of the Chicago Sun-Times enjoyed the film, calling it an "immensely entertaining millennial B-Movie, made for summertime viewing." Simon Thompson of IGN gave the film a 9/10, noting, "The Shallows does for surfing what The Blair Witch Project did for camping and makes Jaws look like a children's tea party... Terrifyingly good." Matt Zoller Seitz of RogerEbert.com gave the film three stars, commending the performance of Blake Lively while adding "Lively is superb here, giving one of those hyper-focused, action-led performances that's as much an athletic feat as an aesthetic one."

Staci Layne Wilson of Dread Central gave the film a negative review, saying although she wanted to like it, she felt that with "Jaume Collet-Serra's sledgehammer-style direction, Anthony Jaswinski's intelligence-insulting screenplay, and Marco Beltrami's misguided musical score, The Shallows is impossible to endorse." The A.V. Club's Ignatiy Vishnevetsky, while finding the film intermittently entertaining, considered it a step down from director Collet-Serra's previous "gimmicky genre piece" Non-Stop as well as lacking a genuine, sustained sense of suspense. He also took issue with the writing, stating: "Anthony Jaswinski's screenplay bogs down this no-brainer survival premise (“get off the rock and don't die”) with needless backstory and inchoate themes. Can't a heroine just survive a vicious shark attack without also having to overcome a family trauma and make a decision about whether or not she wants to be a doctor?"

=== Accolades ===
List of awards and nominations
Award	Date of ceremony	Category	Recipient(s)	Result	Ref.
Golden Tomato Awards	January 12, 2017	Best Thriller Movie 2016	The Shallows	5th place	
People's Choice Awards	January 18, 2017	Favorite Thriller Movie	The Shallows	Nominated	
Saturn Awards	June 28, 2017	Best Thriller Film	The Shallows	Nominated	
Teen Choice Awards	July 31, 2016	Choice Summer Movie Star: Female	Blake Lively	Nominated	

== Remake ==
The film has a Chinese remake with the same title and this had a nationwide release on January 16, 2025.

== See also ==
- List of killer shark films
- Jaws
- Survival film, about the film genre, with a list of related films
