= Susquehanna International Group =

Trading firm

Susquehanna International Group, LLP
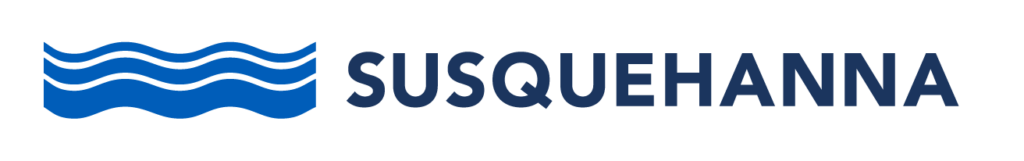

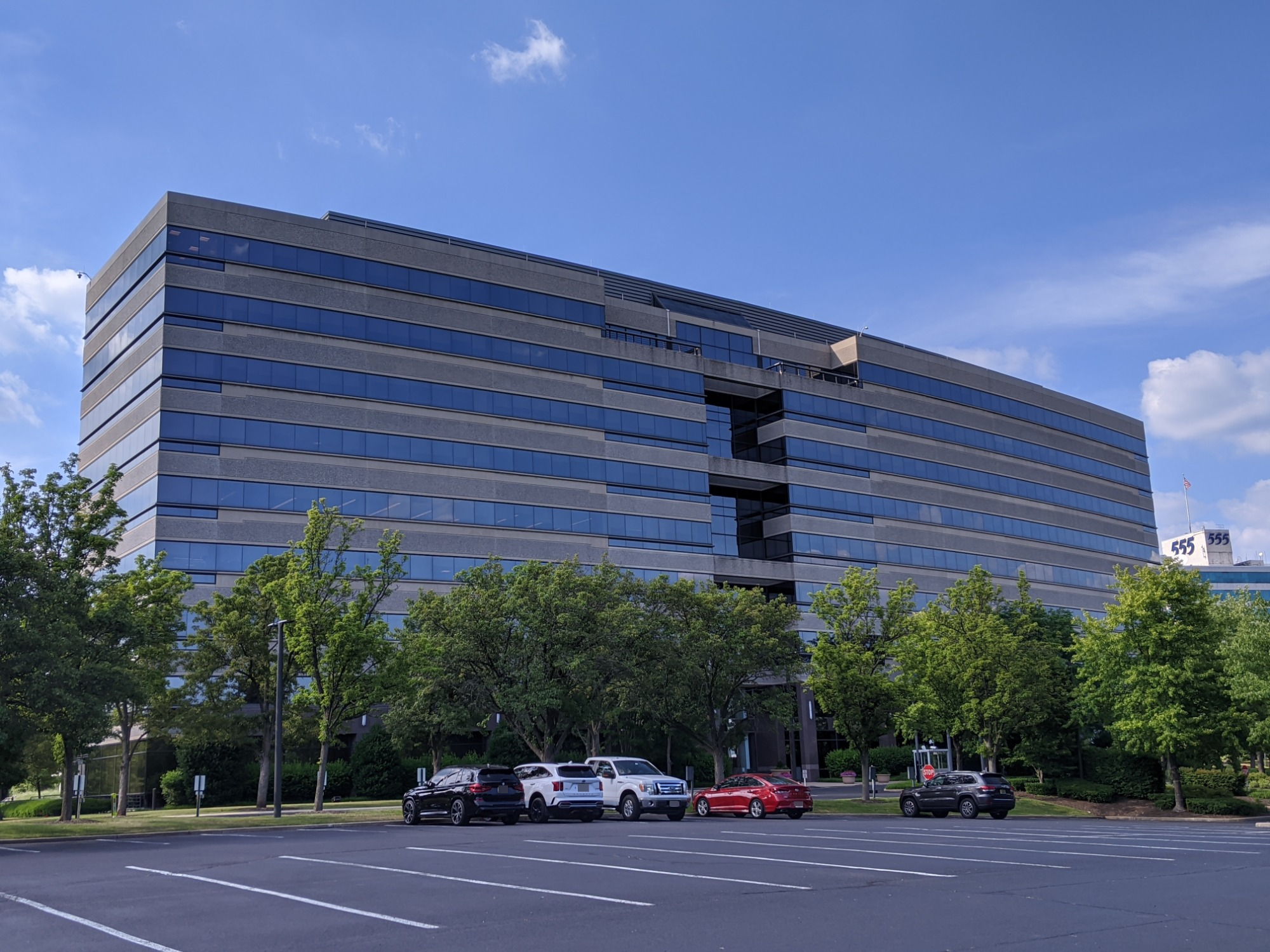
- Susquehanna's main office in the Philadelphia area, on 401 City Avenue
- Type: Privately held (LLP)
- Industry: Financial services
- Founded: May 1987; 39 years ago
- Founders: Jeff Yass; Gerald Yass; Arthur Dantchik; Steve Bloom; Eric Brooks; Andrew Frost; Joel Greenberg; Peter Smith
- Headquarters: Bala Cynwyd, Pennsylvania, U.S.
- Area served: Worldwide
- Products: Institutional brokerage; Market maker; Private equity
- Revenue: ▲$22.1 billion (2025)
- Total assets: $868 billion
- Number of employees: 3,500+(2026)
- Website: sig.com

The Susquehanna International Group (SIG) is an electronic market making company. Its headquarters are in Bala Cynwyd, Pennsylvania.

Susquehanna comprises a number of affiliated entities specializing in trading and proprietary investments in equities, fixed income, energy, commodity, index and derivative products, private equity and venture capital, prediction markets, research, customer trading, and institutional sales.

Susquehanna is a specialist or designated primary market maker in approximately 600 equity options and 45 index options on the CBOE, AMEX, PHLX, and ISE, including equities such as Google, Goldman Sachs, JPMorgan Chase, GE, PepsiCo, and Microsoft, and indices such as Nasdaq and Russell 2000 options.

The firm employs more than 3,000 people in offices in North America (New York City, Chicago, San Francisco, Philadelphia, Boston, Stamford), Australia (Sydney), Europe (Dublin, London) and Asia (Shanghai, Beijing, Hong Kong, Tokyo).

== History ==
Susquehanna was founded in May 1987 by six entrepreneurs, including Arthur Dantchik and Jeff Yass, who met in the late 1970s at the State University of New York at Binghamton, where they gathered to play cards. The company was named after the Susquehanna River, which flows near their alma mater. By October 1988, the firm had 100 employees and was located above the Philadelphia Stock Exchange. It generated $30 million in revenue in its first year, having earned millions through put options it had bought before the Black Monday stock market crash. Susquehanna's profits in the late 1990s often topped $1 billion. By then, the company was trading convertible bonds, commodity options, index options, and was a major exchange-traded fund market maker.

In 1996, Susquehanna founded Heights Capital Management in San Francisco, which focuses on PIPE investments in healthcare and technology.

In 2005, Susquehanna launched SIG China, its venture capital operation in China. As of 2022, the firm had invested in over 350 companies with over 70 exits.

In 2006, Susquehanna launched Susquehanna Growth Equity, which invests in software and information services, and offers growth stage funding to companies operating in the U.S. and Israel. At this point, Susquehanna had grown to over 12 offices throughout North America, Europe, and Asia.

The same year, the firm invested in Kuxun, a search engine company, which was sold in 2009 to Expedia.

Susquehanna experienced a major downturn during the 2008 financial crisis but rebounded quickly, benefiting from the federal government's bailout of the financial system.

When ByteDance, the parent company of TikTok, was founded in 2012, Susquehanna invested $5 million in it. As of 2020, its stake in ByteDance represented 15% of its fully diluted capitalization table and was valued over $15 billion on paper. During negotiations over TikTok's future ownership in 2025, Susquehanna was among ByteDance's largest existing investors involved in discussions of restructuring TikTok's US operations.

In 2013, Susquehanna acquired G1 Execution Services LLC (G1X) from E-Trade.

In 2014, Susquehanna expanded its venture capital operations to Japan.

In 2017, Susquehanna launched Susquehanna Private Capital, LLC, which focuses on buyouts of U.S. middle market companies in the aerospace, industrials, consumer, healthcare, and business and government services industries.

Also in 2017, Susquehanna established Nellie Analytics, a Dublin-based sports betting company.

As of 2018, the firm traded about 7% of U.S. ETF volume and more than $1.5 trillion in ETFs globally on an annual basis.

As of 2022, the firm had 14 offices worldwide.

In 2024, Susquehanna announced the first dedicated trading desk for prediction markets on Wall Street.

Susquehanna played a significant market maker role in the 2024 merger of Digital World Acquisition Corp. and Trump Media & Technology Group.

In 2025, Susquehanna helped fund the White House's East Wing demolition and planned building of a ballroom.

== Affiliates ==
- Susquehanna Financial Group (SFG): Susquehanna's institutional broker-dealer business, which provides order execution and trading flow services, and equity research coverage of nearly 200 companies.
- Susquehanna Structured Capital: Structured capital group that provides debt and structured equity investments to middle and lower-middle market companies as well as commercial and multi-family real estate projects.
- Susquehanna Foundation: The corporate foundation of Susquehanna. The foundation is organized as a 501(c)(3) nonprofit and contributes to school reform causes.

== Controversies and legal issues ==
=== Allegations of front-running client accounts ===
In 2009, the California Public Employees' Retirement System led a class action lawsuit against Susquehanna and other broker-dealers, including Goldman Sachs, Bank of America, and Van der Moolen, for improperly executing trades for their dealer accounts ahead of their clients. The lawsuit was settled in 2012, when the defendants, including Susquehanna, agreed to pay $18.5 million.

=== Allegations of spoofing stock ===
In 2022, Northwest Biotherapeutics claimed in a suit filed in a Manhattan federal court that Susquehanna, Citadel Securities, Virtu Financial, and other market making firms engaged in repeated spoofing that drove Northwest's share price downward. The case was dismissed in 2024.
