= Joel Greenberg =

Joel Greenberg may refer to:

- Joel Greenberg (businessman), American billionaire businessman
- Joel Greenberg (historian) (born 1946), English educational technology consultant and historian
- Joel Greenberg (politician) (born 1984), American politician and former Florida tax collector; associate of Matt Gaetz
