= Omer Rahamim =

Omer Rahamim עומר רחמים
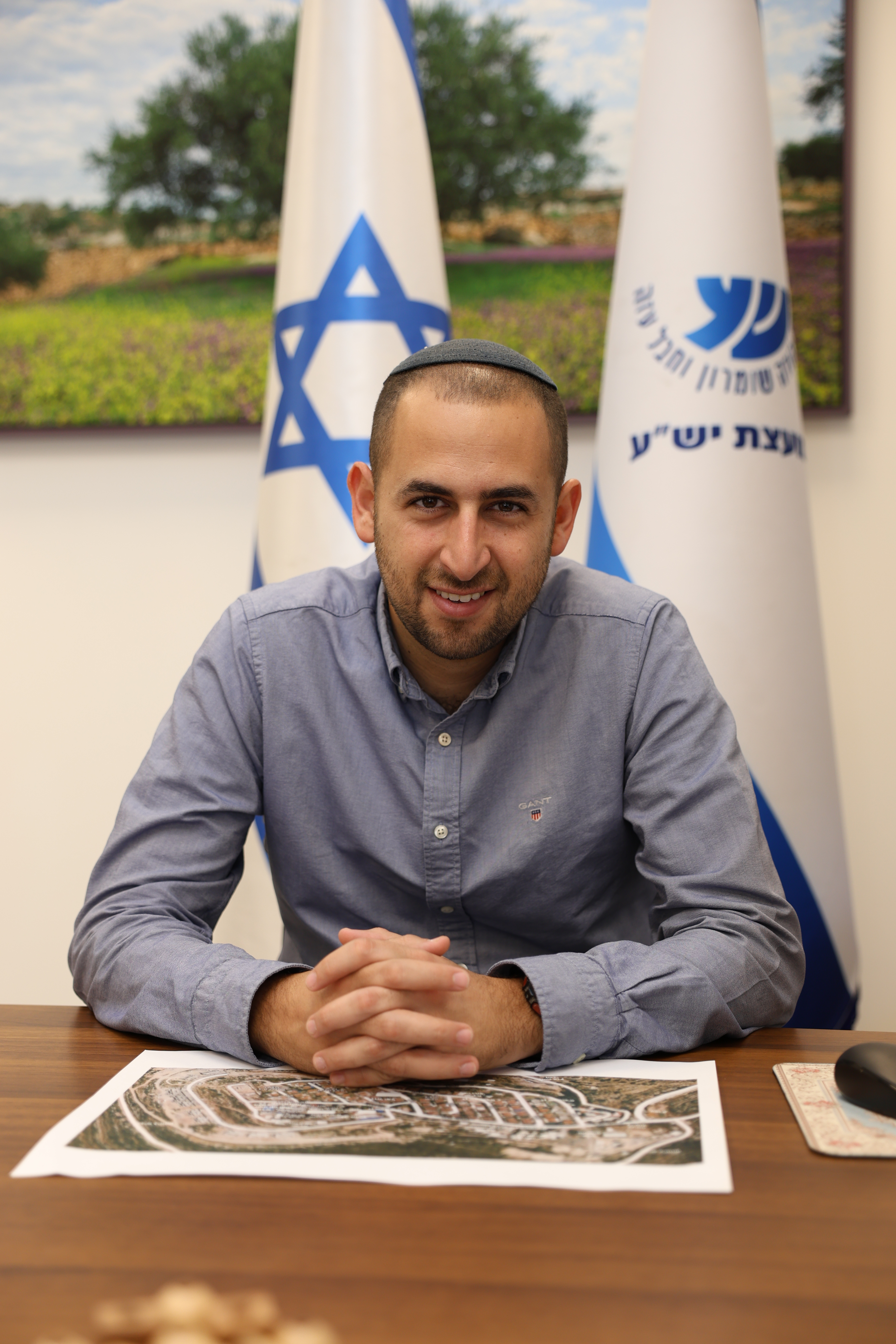
- Omer Rahamim - Director of the Yesha Council

Director General of the Yesha Council

Omer Rahamim (Hebrew:עומר רחמים born 8 Nisan 5751; March 22, 1991) is the director general of the Yesha Council.

Rahamim served as senior advisor to Minister of Finance Bezalel Smotrich.

== Personal life ==
Rahamim was born in Ramat Gan, and grew up in Moshav Bnei Darom and Kfar Saba.

He studied at the AMIT Science and Technology School in Ra'anana, and at the Bnei David pre-military yeshiva academy in Eli. He served as a soldier and commander in the Kfir Brigade.

He earned a bachelor's degree in law and government administration from the Academic Center for Law and Science, and a master's degree in government and public policy from Bar Ilan University.

Rahamim is a reserve officer, with the rank of captain, and serves as deputy company commander in an infantry battalion.

After his military service, Rahamim returned to study at the Bnei David in Eli, and served as head of Rabbi Eli Sadan's office.

In September 2015, Rahamim graduated from the yeshiva, and was appointed Dan District Coordinator of the Bnei Akiva Youth Movement, in which framework he served as a member of the movement's secretariat and management.

Omer Rahamim is married, and has five children.

== Public service ==
In 2017, Rahamim was appointed as an advisor to MK Bezalel Smotrich. He served as Smotrich's advisor on the finance committee, and also coordinated Smotrich's relationship with rabbinical authorities.

In 2019, Smotrich was appointed minister of transportation, and appointed Rahamim as his advisor. As an advisor to the minister of transportation, Rahamim dealt with the relationship between the Ministry and local authorities.

In 2020, when Smotrich completed his role as minister of transportation and returned to the Knesset as an MK, Rahamim joined him, and served as his close advisor.

In 2023, Smotrich was appointed minister of finance, and chose Rahamim as the minister's advisor to the Knesset and the Government. In his role, Rahamim was a key player in the Knesset Finance Committee, and the Ministerial Committee for Legislation.

In June 2024, Rahamim was appointed CEO of the Yesha Council.

In 2025, he was part of a delegation of Israeli settlers from the West Bank who attended Donald Trump's inauguration in the United States. He attended the Conservative Political Action Conference (CPAC), and praised their resolution to "recognize Israel's sovereignty over Judea and Samaria". He traveled to the United Arab Emirates in March with an Israeli delegation, and participated in a Ramadan iftar meal with senior member of the UAE National Council Ali Rashid al-Nuaimi.
