= Mercury Public Affairs =

American lobbying firm

Mercury Public Affairs, LLC
- Headquarters: Saddle Brook, New Jersey
- Key people: Michael Soliman (President); John Gallagher (CEO)

Mercury Public Affairs is an international lobbying and communications firm based in Saddle Brook, New Jersey.

== History ==
In 2025, South Korea's government retained Mercury Public Affairs and former Trump campaign adviser Bryan Lanza to lobby against potential tariffs imposed on the country by the Trump Administration.

In April 2025, Bloomberg reported Mercury's lobbying receipts increased by 58% in 2024, the largest among firms with at least $10 million in reported revenue.

In August 2025, Mercury Public Affairs was retained by the Government of India to lobby for reduced tariffs.

In 2026, Haaretz reported that Israeli right-wing think tank Misgav Institute hired Mercury Public Affairs to advocate for the United States' withdrawal from the United Nations.
