= Dani Dayan =

Israeli diplomat and entrepreneur (born 1955)

- דני דיין
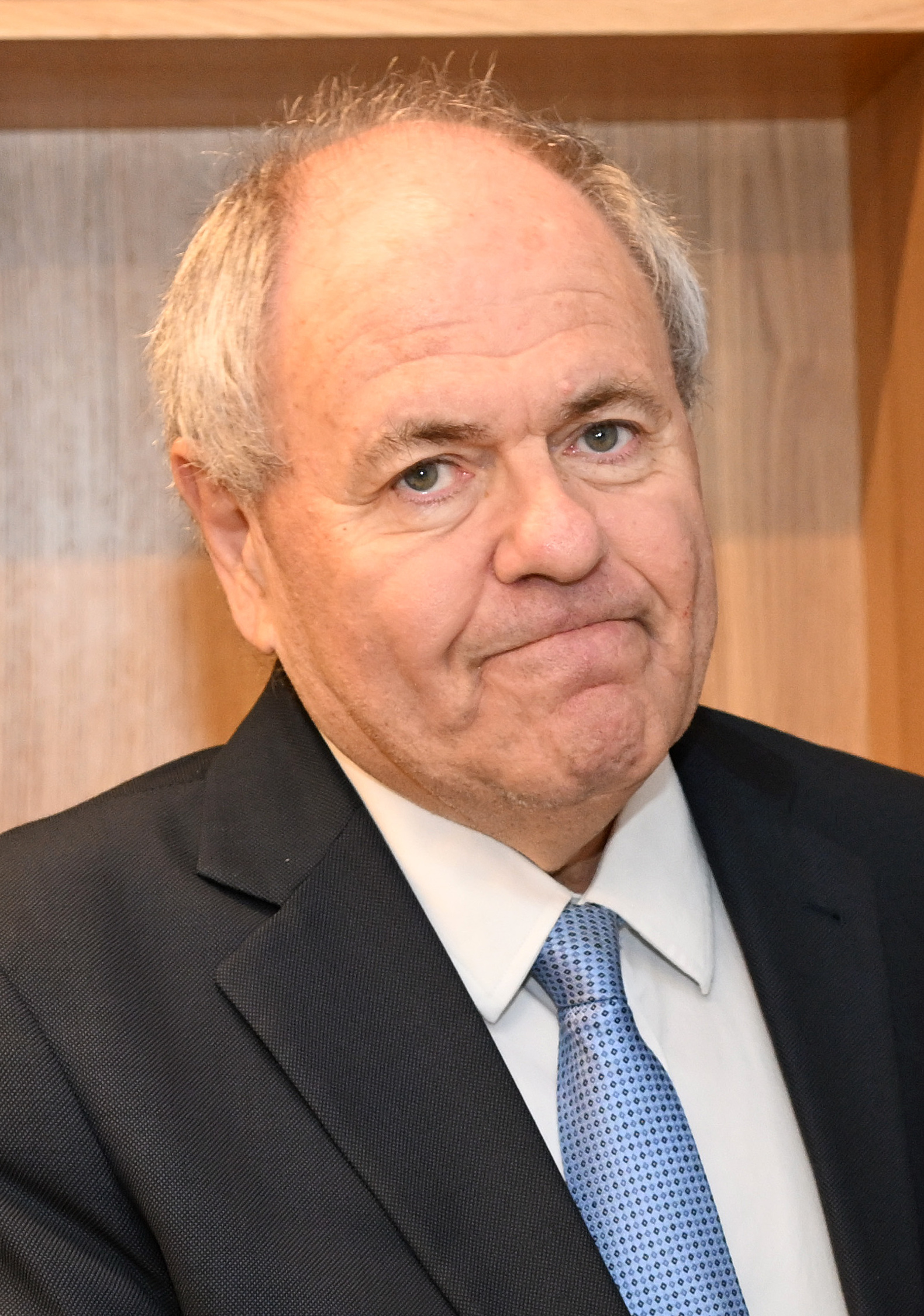
- Dayan in 2025

Diplomatic roles
- 2016–2020: Consul general to the United States

Personal details
- Born: 29 November 1955 (age 70) Buenos Aires, Argentina
- Relatives: Ilana Dayan (cousin)
- Education: Bar Ilan University; Tel Aviv University
- Occupation: Yad Vashem Chairman

Dani Dayan (Hebrew: דני דיין; born 29 November 1955) is an Argentine-born Israeli diplomat and entrepreneur. He is chairman of Yad Vashem.

== Biography ==
Daniel (Dani) Dayan was born in Buenos Aires, Argentina. He and his family immigrated to Israel in 1971, when he was 15, settling in the Tel Aviv neighborhood of Yad Eliyahu. Dayan spent 7 1/2 years in the Israeli Army.

Dayan holds a B.Sc. in Economics and Computer Science from Bar Ilan University, and an M.Sc. in Finance from the Tel Aviv University. He is a Major (Res.) in the Israel Defense Forces. He lives in Ma'ale Shomron.

Dayan is married to Einat Dayan, a former political activist who worked as the director of strategy, marketing, and sales at Ariel University. Their daughter Ofir served in the IDF Spokesperson's Unit, studied at Columbia University and is a research assistant in the Diane and Guilford Glazer Israel-China Policy Center at the Israeli Institute for National Security Studies. His father, Moshe, a second cousin of General Moshe Dayan, was the Israeli ambassador to Guatemala in the early 1980s.

== Business career ==
In 1982, Dayan established an information technology firm "Elad Systems" based in Tel Aviv. He served first as CEO and later as chairman of the board. Elad Systems became one of the leading information technology firms in Israel, specializing in tailor-made software development, facility management and software package. In 2004, when he sold his interests in the company, Elad Systems employed over 500 professionals.

== Political career ==
Dayan was the Secretary-General of the Tehiya political party, and was a candidate to the Knesset on its list in the Israeli legislative elections in 1988 and 1992.

Dayan was a member on the executive committee of the Yesha Council for eight years, before being elected as chairman on July 13, 2007. Following his election, Dayan began transforming the council into an effective political lobby, modeled on American political lobbies. Dayan resigned in 2013, but at the same time created a new post for himself as the foreign envoy of the Yesha Council. In the 2021 Israeli legislative election, Dayan was placed on the eleventh spot of the New Hope Party List.

His writing appears in many publications, including The New York Times, The Los Angeles Times, The Boston Globe, USA Today, The Guardian, Breitbart, Haaretz, The Times of Israel and The Jerusalem Post.

== Diplomatic career ==
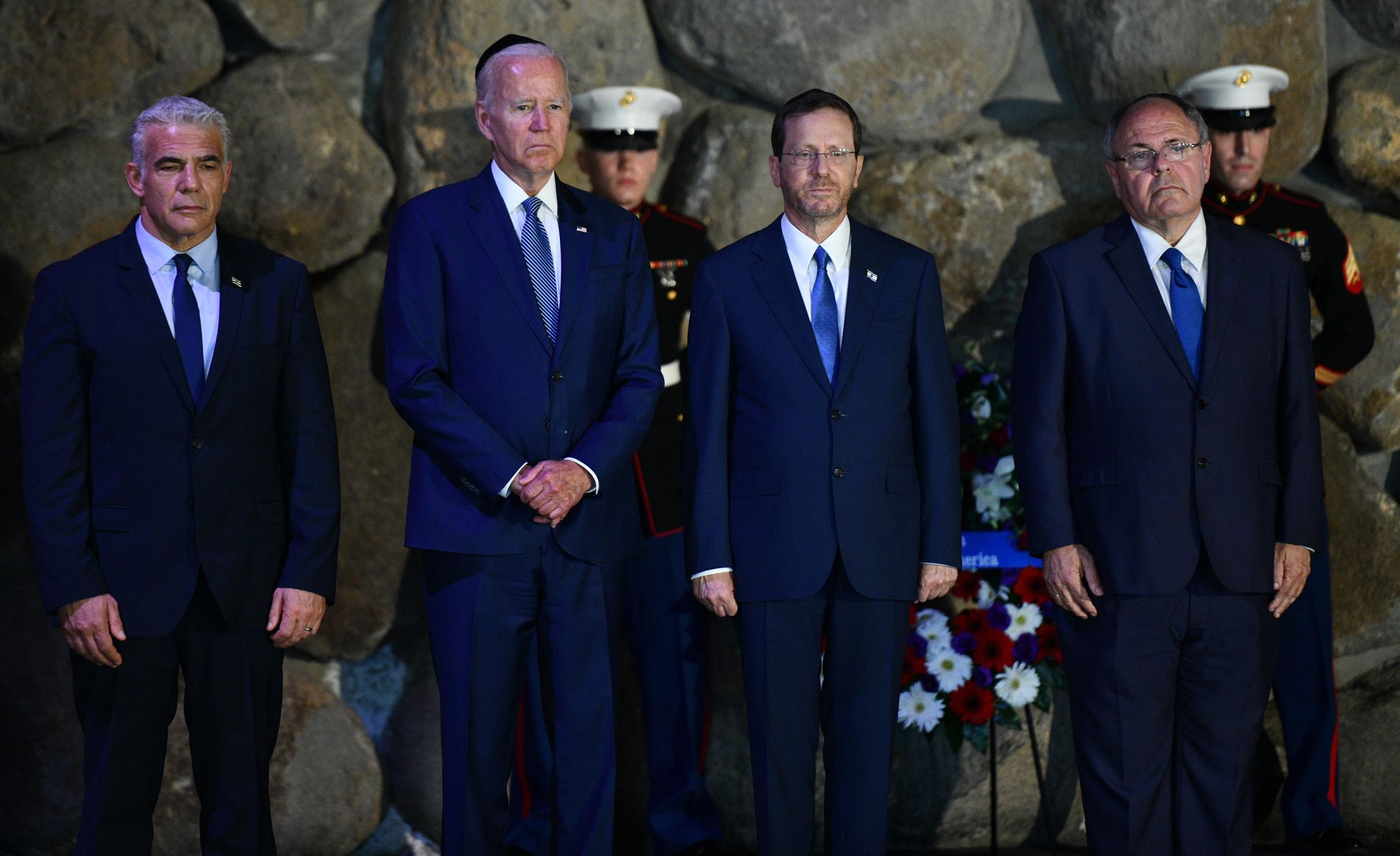
Dayan with U.S. President Joe Biden, Yad Vashem, July 2022

In 2015 Dayan was appointed by Prime Minister Benjamin Netanyahu to be the Israeli ambassador to Brazil. The Brazilian government delayed its approval of Dayan's appointment over months, sparking a diplomatic crisis between the countries. His appointment was opposed by leftist sectors of the political coalition governing Brazil, as well as social movements. In January 2016, 40 retired Brazilian ambassadors from all political spheres released a manifesto supporting the Brazilian government. Brazil's reluctance to approve Dayan as Israel's Ambassador developed into a diplomatic rift between the two countries. The standoff continued until March 2016, when Israel assigned Dayan as Consul General of Israel in New York instead. Dayan served as Consul General of Israel in New York from August 2016 until August 2020. He represented Israel to 5 states: New York, New Jersey, Pennsylvania, Delaware and Ohio. His term as Consul General is widely considered as very successful. Dayan managed to develop close relations with all sectors of the civil society and the Jewish community.

== Chairman of Yad Vashem ==
Dayan was appointed as Chairman of Yad Vashem in August 2021.

As chairman of Yad Vashem, Dayan cited Holocaust distortion promoted by governments around the world, including Israel's, as a serious problem. The Jerusalem Post reported that Dayan said these governments admit that the Holocaust happened, but claim their countrymen did nothing wrong. Dayan told Haaretz that, “Unlike Holocaust denial of the past, Holocaust distortion today is backed and financed by governments and powerful civil society entities. Even Jews … [who] cleanse the past ” of their respective countries, contrary to historical fact.

In 2022, there was a heated dispute about the display of a photo of the Grand Mufti of Jerusalem, Haj Amin al-Husseini and Hitler in Yad Vashem. Benjamin Netanyahu wanted the image displayed but Dayan refused. Netanyahu, who at the time was Prime Minister of Israel and leader of the Likud party, has been accused of Holocaust revisionism for his claim that Grand Mufti of al-Husseini gave Hitler the idea for The Final Solution. The cause of the Holocaust was European antisemitism, not external influences from the Middle East.

In May 2026, Dayan condemned the Ukrainian decision to give the nationalist figure Andriy Melnyk a state funeral, stating: "Honouring the leader of a movement that supported and collaborated with Nazi Germany during the persecution and murder of millions of Jews undermines the moral integrity essential to Holocaust remembrance". In response, Dayan was placed and described as a criminal on the controversial Ukrainian Myrotvorets website.
