= Eugene Kontorovich =

Israeli-American legal scholar (born 1975)

- 'יוג'ין קונטורוביץ
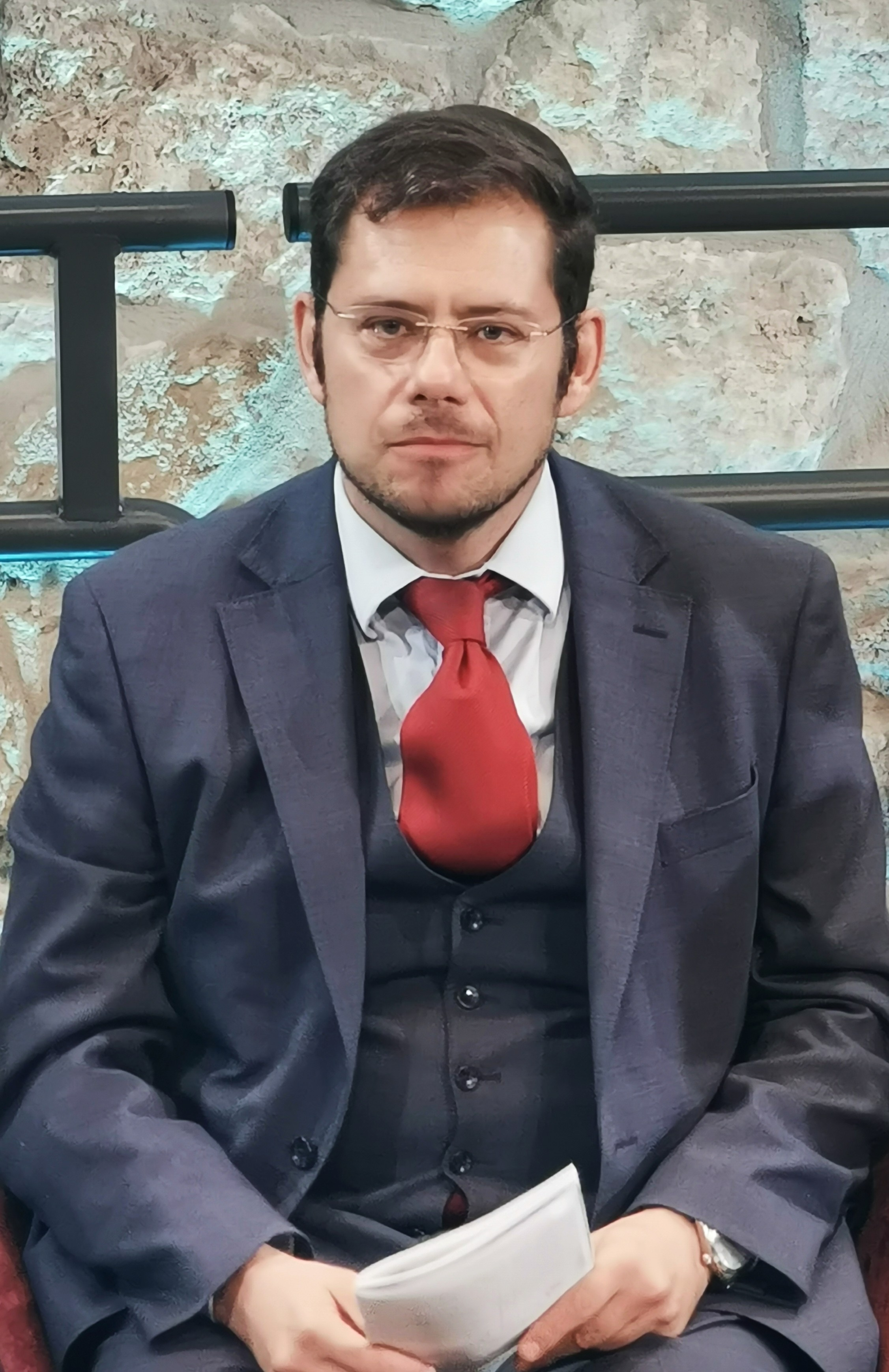
- Kontorovich in Jerusalem, 2018
- Born: 1975 (age 50–51); Kiev, Ukrainian SSR, Soviet Union (now Kyiv, Ukraine)
- Citizenship: Israeli
- Education: University of Chicago (JD)
- Occupations: Professor; activist
- Years active: 2011–present
- Organization: Kohelet Policy Forum
- Children: 4

Eugene Kontorovich (Hebrew: 'יוג'ין קונטורוביץ; born 1975) is an Israeli-American legal scholar, specializing in piracy, universal jurisdiction, constitutional and international law. He serves as director of the international law department at the Kohelet Policy Forum, and is a professor at Antonin Scalia Law School at George Mason University, as well as a Senior Researcher at the Heritage Foundation.

== Career ==
=== In the United States ===
Kontorovich studied law at the University of Chicago. He later clerked for Judge Richard Posner on the U.S. Court of Appeals. In 2011, he received a fellowship at the Institute for Advanced Study in Princeton, and in 2012 was awarded the Federalist Society's Bator Award, given annually to a young scholar under 40.

From 2011 to 2018, Kontorovich worked as a professor at Northwestern University School of Law. Since then he has served as a Professor of Law at Antonin Scalia Law School, where he established the Center for the Middle East and International Law.

Kontorovich coined the term "gaolbalization" (gaol + globalization): the practice of one country sending its excess prison population to another country with excess capacity.

=== In Israel ===
Kontorovich has been active in opposing boycotts of Israel and its settlements, including standing before a special US congressional committee on the topic.

Kontorovich is a fellow of the Jerusalem Center for Public Affairs, and is the director the international law department at the Kohelet Policy Forum. He occasionally writes for The Washington Post and The Jerusalem Post.

Kontorovich is a proponent of using anti-BDS laws to combat the BDS movement. He has helped many US states draft such legislation. In 2016, he served as an expert advisor to the group that sued the American Studies Association over its 2013 decision to boycott Israeli academic institutions.

Kontorovich has been critical of both the Law of Return's Grandchild Clause and of the push to lower Judaism conversion standards in Israel. He has also criticized the international community for its hypocrisy on territorial integrity, opposition to military conquest and the use of force, and blind eye towards Azerbaijan's 2020 and 2023 reconquest of and subsequent ethnic cleansing of Armenians in Nagorno-Karabakh.

== Personal life ==
Born in Kyiv, Ukraine, Kontorovich moved to the US with his parents at the age of three. He immigrated to Israel in 2013 with his wife and four children. He divorced and remarried to Yehudit, with whom he had a son, and lives in a settlement community near Jerusalem.
