= Tifereth Beth David Jerusalem =

- Hebrew: תפארת בית דוד ירושלים
- Location in Montreal

Religion
- Affiliation: Modern Orthodox Judaism
- Rite: Nusach Ashkenaz
- Ecclesiastical or organisational status: Synagogue
- Leadership: Rabbi Zolly Claman
- Status: Active

Location
- Location: 6519 Baily Road; Côte Saint-Luc, Montreal, Quebec
- Country: Canada
- Coordinates: 45°28′40″N 73°39′20″W

Architecture
- Established: 1965 (merged congregation): 1886 (Beth David); 1904 (Tifereth Jerusalem, Kehal Yeshurin, Beth Itzchak)

Website
- tbdj.org

Tifereth Beth David Jerusalem (Hebrew: ק״ק תפארת בית דוד ירושלים), also known as the Baily Shul, is a Modern Orthodox congregation and synagogue in Côte Saint-Luc, Montreal, Quebec, Canada. The congregation was established in 1965 with the merger of Congregations Beth David and Tifereth Jerusalem, founded in 1886 and 1904, respectively. The congregation worships in the Ashkenazi rite.

== History ==
Congregation Beth David (Hebrew: בית דוד), also known as the Rumanishe Shul (Yiddish: רומענישע שול, lit. 'Romanian Synagogue') was founded by Romanian Jewish immigrants in 1886. It was apparently named after the father of its first president, David Elimelech Pinsler. Between 1890 and 1929 the congregation was located in the former building of Congregation Shearith Israel at 89 Chenneville Street, after which it relocated to a former church at 422 St. Joseph Boulevard. It absorbed the Galician synagogue Kehal Yeshurin in 1957 and Russian synagogue Beth Itzchak in 1959, both founded in 1904.

Congregation Tifereth Jerusalem (Hebrew: תפארת ירושלים), also known as the Rossland Jewish Synagogue, was founded by Russian Jewish immigrants in 1904. It merged with the Jewish Community of Eastern Côte St. Luc & Hampstead in 1962, and with Beth David in 1965.

== Rabbis ==
- David Hartman (1960–1971)
- Eliyahu Steinhorn
- Joshua Shmidman (1975–1995)
- Chaim Steinmetz (1996–2015)
- Yechezkel Freundlich (2016–2022)
- Zolly Claman (2022–present)
