= Avi Bell =

American-Israeli legal scholar

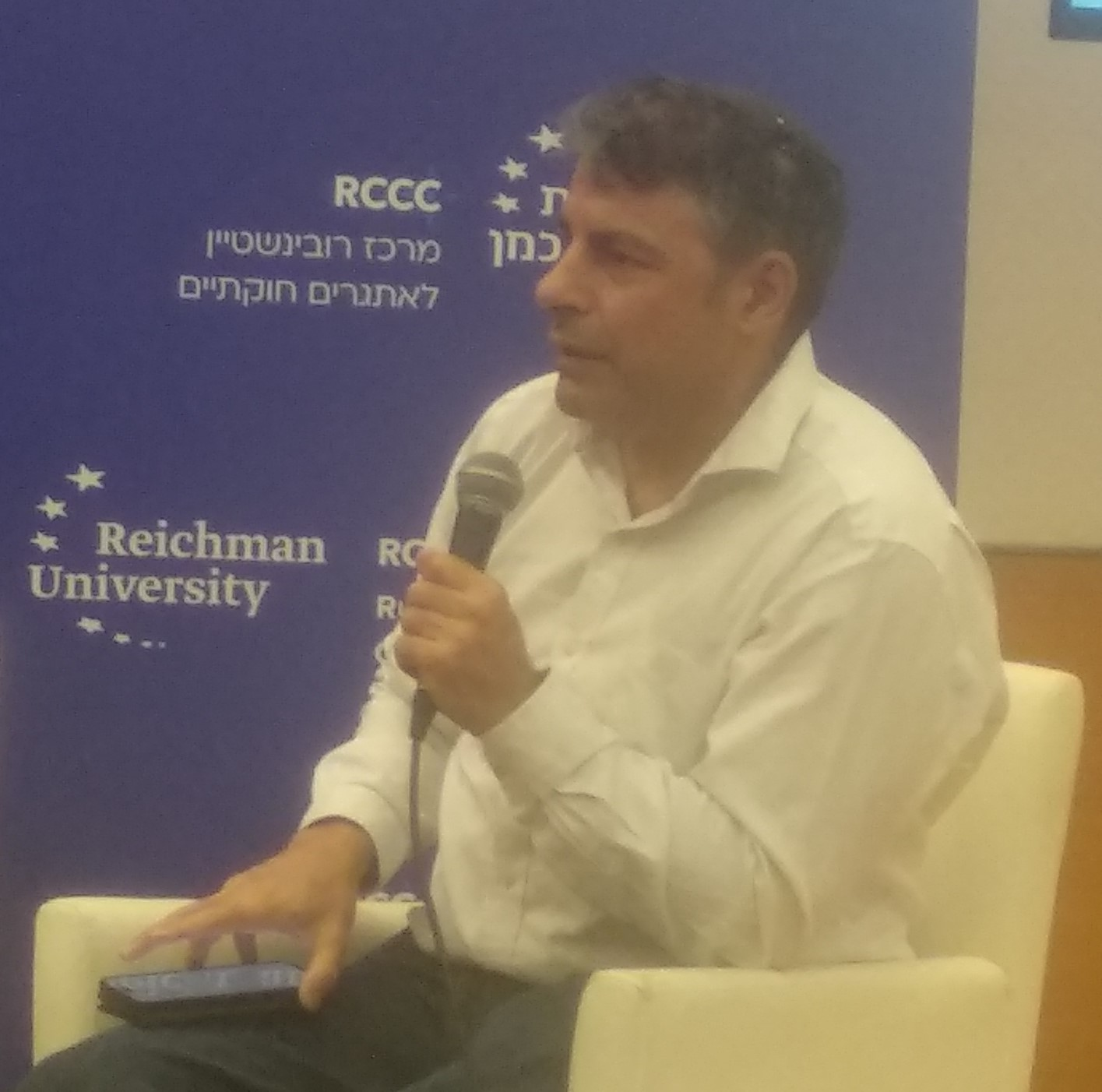
Image of Abraham Bell

Abraham (Avi) Bell (Hebrew: אבי בל) is an Israeli Professor of Law at the University of San Diego School of Law and at Bar-Ilan University's Faculty of Law.

Bell received his B.A. and J.D. from the University of Chicago, and his S.J.D. from Harvard. He interned in the office of Israeli Supreme Court judge Mishael Cheshin.

In addition, Bell frequently writes about the Arab-Israeli conflict. He also debated Richard Goldstone in a debate at Stanford Law School entitled “The Goldstone Report and the Application of International Law to the Arab-Israeli Conflict,” where a few days later, Goldstone said that “contrary to the report’s assertions, Israel did not intentionally target civilians.”

In 2006, Bell criticized Human Rights Watch for its reports on the Second Lebanon War, claiming that the organization's claims "mislead readers and betray ... bias," and that "HRW investigation [in Srifa, Lebanon] was either professionally incompetent or a complete fabrication" and "nothing more than window dressing for predetermined anti-Israel conclusions." Human Rights Watch responded by claiming that Bell "displays a curious ignorance about even the basic requirements of international humanitarian law" However, a 2007 report of Human Rights Watch admitted that its "allegation [of criminality in Srifa] turned out to be wrong." The report stated that "eyewitnesses were not always forthcoming about the identity of those that died, and in the case of Srifa, misled our researchers ... a visit to the graveyard made it possible to establish that most of those killed in Srifa were actually combatants," and concluding that "further Human Rights Watch investigations into a deadly strike at Srifa established that an Israeli attack there killed 17 combatants and five civilians on July 19, not the 26 civilians claimed in Fatal Strikes" and "Human Rights Watch regrets the serious inaccuracy in its initial Fatal Strikes report."

Bell was formerly a visiting professor at Fordham University School of Law and the University of Connecticut School of Law.

He currently teaches classes on property and intellectual property at University of San Diego School of Law, and on property, intellectual property and public international law at Bar-Ilan University's Faculty of Law.

Bell also serves as Senior Fellow at the Kohelet Policy Forum.
