= Misgav Institute for National Security and Zionist Strategy =

Israeli think tank

Institute for Zionist Strategies
- המכון לאסטרטגיה ציונית
- Founded: 2005; 21 years ago
- Headquarters: Jerusalem, Israel
- Key people: Yoel Golovenski, president Yoaz Hendel, chairperson Miri Shalem, chief executive officer
- Website: www.misgavins.org

The Misgav Institute for National Security and Zionist Strategy (formerly named Institute for Zionist Strategies) is an Israeli think tank.

== History ==
Journalist and activist Yisrael Harel founded the non-profit Institute for Zionist Strategies (IZS) in Jerusalem in November 2004. IZS credited Natan Sharansky, Moshe Arens, and Moshe Ya'alon as playing a role in its founding.

IZS's goals included promotion of education and research and developing young public leaders across Israeli society.

== Activities ==
IZS has published position papers.

=== Strategic forum ===
IZS had a strategic forum, which included diplomat Dror Eydar, politician Yoaz Hendel, and journalist Amnon Lord as of 2012.

=== Constitutional task force ===
IZS was one of several organizations to propose ideas to the Knesset's Constitution, Law and Justice Committee for discussions around a constitution. Its proposal, authored by scholar Avraham Diskin and others, suggested strengthening the parliamentary system rather than shifting to a presidential system.

=== Foreign funding for NGO's ===
This project studied more than 20 NGOs in Israel and their donors. The Institute, in collaboration with NGO Monitor, issued a joint report claiming that foreign governments were funding NGOs in Israel in order to influence Israeli policy and public debate. As a result, a bill was proposed to the Knesset requiring funding disclosure by NGOs receiving support from foreign political entities. The bill was approved in February 2011 and was not well received by the European Union.

=== Accusations of bias in academia ===
The IZS, as part of the research of Dr. Hanan Moses, examined the extent of "bias toward post-Zionist discourse" in sociology departments throughout Israeli universities and whether what the Institute views as the "Zionist narrative" is given equal treatment in Israeli academia. The investigation claimed that all Israeli universities except Bar-Ilan University have what the research describes as "post-Zionist bias" in their sociology departments. Those claims were compared by some to McCarthyism In 2012, IZS published a report entitled "Post-Zionism in the Academy" that examined syllabi and faculty in sociologoly departments across Israeli universities and identified purported post-Zionist faculty. The publication prompted the Education Committee of the Knesset to hold a hearing of the points raised.

=== 7 October 2023 attack as opportunity to evacuate Gaza Strip ===
In October 2023, the Institute published a paper describing the October 7 attacks as "a unique and rare opportunity to evacuate the entire Gaza Strip". The paper proposes the ethnic cleansing of all of Gaza by displacing its inhabitants to empty apartments near Cairo, Egypt.

=== US withdrawal from the UN advocacy ===
In August 2026, Haaretz reported that the Misgav Institute hired an American lobbying firm, Mercury Public Affairs, to influence Congress and the Trump Administration to promote "From UN Bureaucracy to American Global Leadership: A Strategy for Advancing American Interests by Disengaging from a Failed UN," a report advocating for the United States to withdraw from the United Nations.

The report was authored by Gilad Erdan, Israel's former ambassador to the United Nations and formerly a senior member of the Misgav Institute. According to Foreign Agents Registration Act filings, the contract was disclosed to represent a two-phase lobbying effort, including dissemination of the report in congress and administration offices, and subsequently a tour of Washington, D.C. for Misgav officials to meet with US policymakers.

== Reception ==
Haaretz described IZS in 2006 as the Israeli right-wing's response to the Israel Democracy Institute (IDI).
