= Donniel Hartman =

Israeli rabbi and philosopher

- דניאל הרטמן
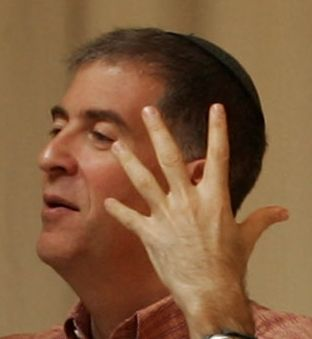
- Born: October 13, 1958 (age 67)

Philosophical work
- Main interests: Human rights; pluralism; Israel; Judaism

Donniel Hartman (Hebrew: דניאל הרטמן; born October 13, 1958) is an Israeli Modern Orthodox rabbi and author. He is President of the Shalom Hartman Institute in Jerusalem.

== Biography ==
Hartman was born in New York to Barbara and David Hartman. When he was 13 years old, his family immigrated to Israel.

He studied at Yeshivat Netiv Meir and Yeshivat Har Etzion. Enlisted in the Armored Corps where he commanded a tank and fought in the First Lebanon War. Following the war, Hartman returned to the United States where he studied for a master's degree and served as a rabbi at a community center in New Jersey.

He has a doctorate in Jewish philosophy from The Hebrew University of Jerusalem, a Master of Arts in political philosophy from New York University, and a Master of Arts in religion from Temple University. He has rabbinic ordination from the Shalom Hartman Institute.

== Rabbinic and academic career ==
He has written books and essays on Judaism and modernity and is a frequent speaker at academic conferences and synagogues in the United States and Canada. In 2009, he spoke at the Grand Valley State University Conference, "Religion and the Challenges of Modernity." In the 1990s, he was scholar in residence at the Jewish Community Center of the Palisades in New Jersey. He was described by a Reform Judaism organization as a thinker "whose thoughts, observations, and analysis of Israeli society are radical and refreshing."

Hartman has established a program at the Shalom Hartman Institute that will lead to the ordination of rabbis - men and women - outside of existing Orthodox rabbinical seminaries in Israel.

He has argued for the need for Israelis to accept a two-state solution that recognizes Palestinian interests and to provide a "multiple narrative" for Israel that accepts non-Jewish Israelis.

He has said that Israel and Diaspora Jewry must "rethink" their relationship.

In 2007, Donniel Hartman founded a religious high school for girls, the Midrashiya, whose curriculum includes "a critical approach to the study of Jewish texts," volunteer work, and a sex-education curriculum, "one of the first ever among religious schools in Israel."

== Published works ==
- Putting God Second: How to Save Religion from Itself, 2016 [dead link]
- The Boundaries of Judaism (Continuum Books, 2007) ISBN 978-0-8264-9663-8
- Judaism and the Challenges of Modern Life, Co-Editor with Moshe Halbertal (Continuum Books, 2007) ISBN 0-8264-9668-7
- "Mishpatim: A Man in Public," in The Modern Men's Torah Commentary: New Insights from Jewish Men on the 54 Weekly Torah Portions, Jeffrey K. Salkin, Ed. (Jewish Lights Publishing, 2009) ISBN 978-1-58023-395-8
- Speaking iEngage: Creating a New Narrative Regarding the Significance of Israel for Jewish Life (Shalom Hartman Institute, 2013) ASIN: B00HBAYLSY [dead link]
- Putting God Second: How to Save Religion from Itself (Beacon, 2016) ISBN 978-0807053928 [dead link]
- Hartman, Donniel (2023). Who are the Jews - and who can we become?. Lincoln: University of Nebraska Press. ISBN 9780827615618.

== See also ==
- David Hartman
- Yossi Klein Halevi
- Menachem Lorberbaum
- Tova Hartman
