= Matti Leshem =

American film and TV producer

- Born: January 2, 1963 (age 63)
- Education: Sarah Lawrence College; American Film Institute
- Occupation: Film producer
- Spouse: Lynn Harris (m. 2009)

Matti Leshem is an Israeli-American film and TV producer.

== Early life ==
Leshem was born to Jewish parents, Alyssa Leshem, a skincare specialist of Boca Raton and Moshe Leshem, an Israeli diplomat. His father was also a Holocaust survivor and as a diplomat held missions in Zaire and Denmark. His father also served as Israel's Ambassador to the United Nations. During this period, Leshem attended Ramaz School, a prestigious Modern Orthodox school on the Upper East Side of Manhattan in New York City.

Leshem later earned a bachelor’s degree from Sarah Lawrence College, and a master’s degree in directing from the American Film Institute.

== Career ==
Leshem is the co-founder of New Mandate Films, an American film and television production company focused on Jewish history and literature.

In 2014, with his wife Lynn Harris, he co-founded Weimaraner Republic Pictures, a film, TV and digital production company.

He was a producer on the Barry Levinson 2021 film, The Survivor, along with business partner and friend Joel Greenberg, who was an executive producer.

Leshem created Martin Scorsese Presents: The Saints, an eight-part docudrama TV series, with Martin Scorsese narrating the lives of eight Christian saints, and Leshem producing.

== Personal life ==
In 2009, Leshem, then a "marketing executive" married Lynn Harris, a film executive, at the Parker Palm Springs hotel in Palm Springs, California, with Rabbi Sharon Brous officiating. In November 2023 in Los Angeles, they hosted a delegation of Israeli survivors of the October 7 attacks and the families of hostages.

His cousin's two adult children were killed at the Nova music festival massacre in Israel.
