= Joel Greenberg (businessman) =

American billionaire businessman

- Born: 1957 or 1958 (age 68–69)
- Education: Binghamton University; Columbia University
- Occupation: Businessman
- Known for: co-founder of Susquehanna International Group
- Spouse: Marcy Gringlas
- Children: 3

Joel Kenneth Greenberg (born 1957 or 1958) is an American billionaire businessman, and a co-founder of Susquehanna International Group.

As of January 2025, Forbes estimated his net worth at US$2.3 billion.

His mother Carol Potasnik Greenberg (1927–2013) was born in Yonkers, New York, and moved to Israel in her 40s.

Greenberg earned a bachelor's degree from Binghamton University, where he met his fellow billionaire co-founder, Jeff Yass. He then earned a juris doctor degree from Columbia Law School.

In 1987, he co-founded Susquehanna International Group, and was its chief operating officer. Greenberg owns about 3% of Susquehanna, and retired in 2016.

He was an executive producer on the Barry Levinson 2021 film, The Survivor, along with business partner and friend Matti Leshem, who was a producer.

Greenberg is married to Marcy Gringlas, with three children, and lives in Gladwyne, Pennsylvania. They also have a home in Vineyard Haven on Martha's Vineyard, Massachusetts. Marcy Gringlas, the daughter of Holocaust survivors Joseph and Reli, is a longtime USC Shoah Foundation donor and member of its board of councilors. Through their Seed the Dream Foundation, Joel and Marcy have donated over $2 million to the USC Shoah Foundation.
