= David Hartman (rabbi) =

American-Israeli philosopher (1931–2013)

Rabbi David Hartman
- דוד הרטמן
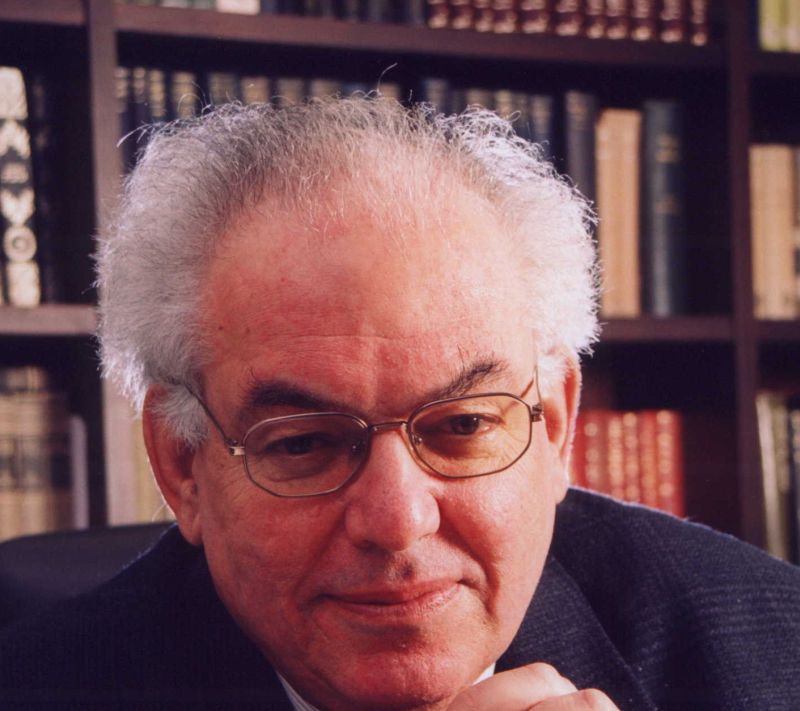

Rabbi of Congregation Tifereth Beth David Jerusalem, Montreal
- In office 1960–1971

Founder of the Shalom Hartman Institute, Jerusalem
- In office 1976–2013

Personal details
- Born: September 11, 1931 Brooklyn, New York City, U.S.
- Died: February 10, 2013 (aged 81) Israel
- Education: Yeshiva University, Fordham University
- Occupation: Rabbi, philosopher, author
- Known for: Founder of the Shalom Hartman Institute

David Hartman (Hebrew: דוד הרטמן; September 11, 1931 – February 10, 2013) was an American-Israeli leader and philosopher of contemporary Judaism, founder of the Shalom Hartman Institute in Jerusalem, and a Jewish author.

== Biography ==
David Hartman was born in the Brownsville section of Brooklyn, New York. He attended Yeshiva Chaim Berlin and the Lubavitch Yeshiva, after which he spent time learning in Lakewood Yeshiva. In 1953, having studied under Rabbi Joseph B. Soloveitchik, he received his rabbinical ordination from Yeshiva University in New York. He continued his studies with Soloveitchik until 1960, while pursuing a graduate degree in philosophy with Robert C. Pollock at Fordham University. In 1971, Hartman immigrated to Israel with his wife Barbara and their five children.

Hartman died on February 10, 2013, in Jerusalem at the age of 81.

== Rabbinic and academic career ==
After serving as a congregational rabbi in the Bronx, New York, from 1955 to 1960, Hartman became the rabbi of Congregation Tiferet Beit David Jerusalem in Montreal. Some of his students moved with him to Israel when he immigrated in 1971. While in Montreal, he also taught and studied at McGill University and received his Ph.D. in philosophy.

Hartman founded the Shalom Hartman Institute in Jerusalem in 1976. He was named founding president in 2009, when his son, Donniel Hartman, was named president. In addition to the institute, he founded the Charles E. Smith High School, which operates separate programs for boys and girls, the latter of which is named Midrashiya, in central Jerusalem.

Hartman was a professor of Jewish Thought at Hebrew University of Jerusalem for over two decades, during which time he was also a visiting professor of Jewish Thought at the University of California, Berkeley in 1986/1987 and at the University of California, Los Angeles in 1997/1998.

From 1977 to 1984, Hartman served as an advisor to Zevulun Hammer, former Israeli Minister of Education, and he was an advisor to a number of Israeli prime ministers on the subject of religious pluralism in Israel and the relationship between Israel and the Diaspora.

== Views and opinions ==
Hartman viewed his immigration to Israel as an essential part of his mission to encourage greater understanding between Jews of diverse affiliations—both in Israel and the Jewish diaspora—and to build a more pluralistic and tolerant Israeli society. His work emphasized the centrality of the rebirth of the State of Israel and religious pluralism, both among Jews and in interfaith relations. As his views often aligned with Conservative Judaism, some have asked whether he should have been, or his writings continue to be, considered Orthodox. Elliot Dorff, a leader of Conservative Judaism, described Hartman as "Orthodox, but close to the right border of Conservative Judaism".

== Published works ==
- A Living Covenant: The Innovative Spirit in Traditional Judaism (Jewish Lights, 1998)
- Maimonides: Torah and Philosophic Quest (Jewish Publication Society, 1976)
- A Heart of Many Rooms: Celebrating the Many Voices Within Judaism (Jewish Lights, 1999)
- Israelis and the Jewish Tradition: An Ancient People Debating Its Future (The Terry Lectures Series) (Yale Univ Press, 2000)
- The God Who Hates Lies: Confronting and Rethinking Jewish Tradition (Jewish Lights, 2011)

He was awarded the National Jewish Book Award in 1977 for Maimonides: Torah and Philosophic Quest and in 1986 for the recently reissued A Living Covenant: The Innovative Spirit in Traditional Judaism. In 1993, the Hebrew translation of A Living Covenant From Sinai to Zion (Am Oved Publishers) was awarded the Leah Goldberg Prize. A Heart of Many Rooms: Celebrating the Many Voices Within Judaism was published by Jewish Lights Publishing in 1999. Israelis and the Jewish Tradition: an Ancient People Debating Its Future was published by Yale University Press, 2000, Love and Terror in the God Encounter: the Theological Legacy of Joseph B. Soloveitchik was published by Jewish Lights 2001. The Hebrew translation of Israelis and the Jewish Tradition (Moreshet b'machloket) was published by Schocken Publishing House, 2002.

== Awards and recognition ==
Hartman was awarded the Avi Chai Prize in the year 2000 and on the twenty-fifth anniversary of the Shalom Hartman Institute he was awarded the Guardian of Jerusalem Prize. He was the recipient of an honorary doctorate from Yale University in May 2003. In 2004 David Hartman received an honorary doctorate from Hebrew Union College and was awarded the Samuel Rothberg Prize for Jewish Education by the Hebrew University of Jerusalem. In 2008, David Hartman received an honorary degree from Weizmann Institute of Rehovot, Israel. He received the doctorate "in recognition of his life's work to revitalize Judaism and strengthen Jewish identity among Jews the world over; above all, of his gift of vision and action, faith and scholarship, toward building a more pluralistic, tolerant, and enlightened Israeli society".

== Bibliography ==
- Goodman, Daniel Ross (2023). Soloveitchik's children : Irving Greenberg, David Hartman, Jonathan Sacks, and the future of Jewish theology in America. Tuscaloosa: The University of Alabama Press. ISBN 9780817321666.
