= Avraham Diskin =

Israeli political scientist

- אברהם דיסקין
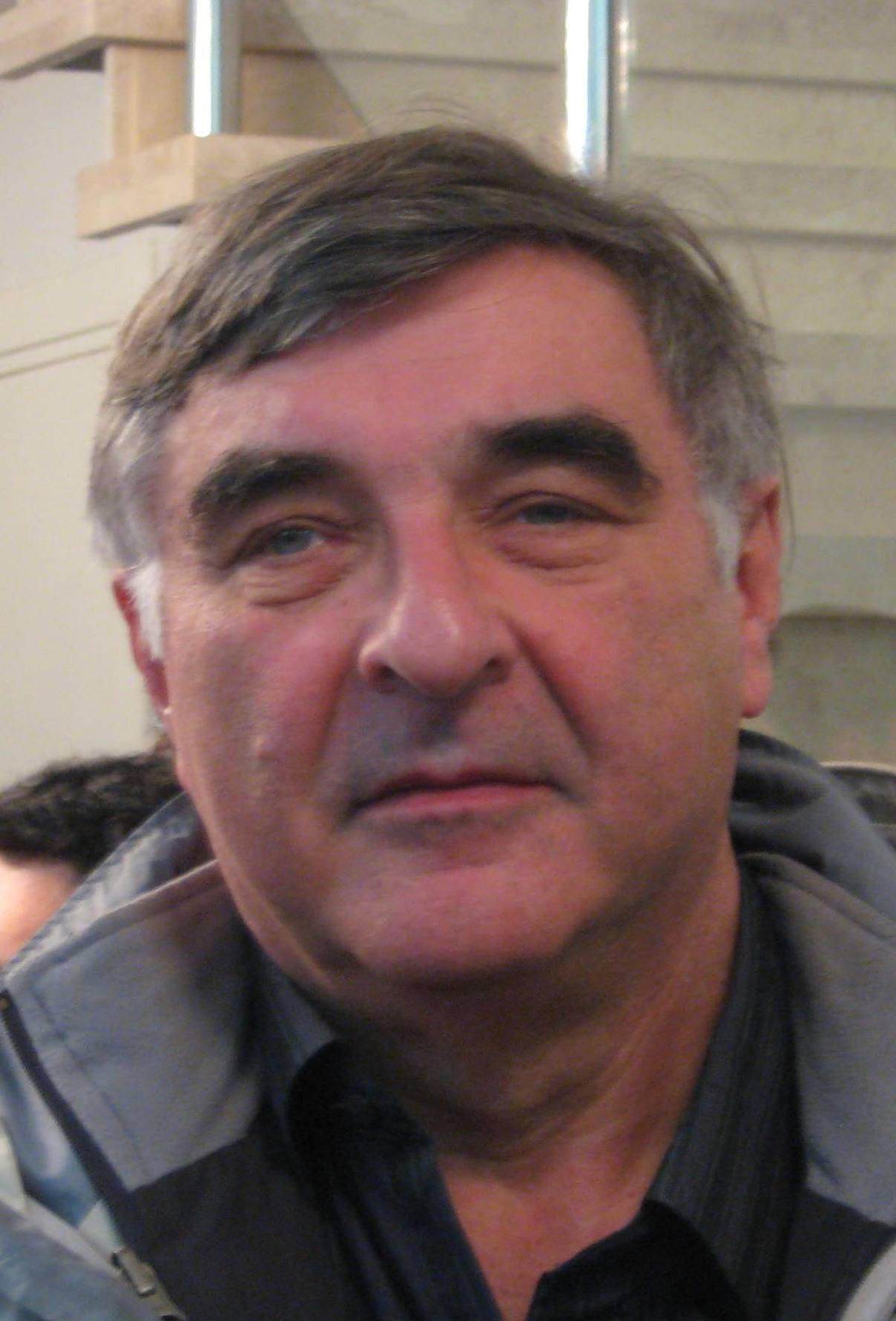
- Born: 1947 (age 78–79); Jerusalem
- Occupations: Lecturer, Author

Abraham Diskin (Hebrew: אברהם דיסקין; born 1947) is an Israeli political scientist at the Hebrew University of Jerusalem, and a professor at the Interdisciplinary Center in Herzliya.

Diskin was the Chair of the Political Science Department of the Hebrew University and the Chair of the Israel Political Science Association. He also served as a visiting professor at several universities in the United States, Canada, Europe and Japan. Diskin has published over twenty books and monographs, mostly about Israeli politics.

In the 1970s, Diskin analyzed the critical importance of the domination of the ‘pivotal point’ (i.e. the balance between the left wing bloc and the right wing bloc), and the significance of voters floating between two major political blocs. During the 2000s, he helped to write the Constitution proposed by the Institute for Zionist Strategies and advised the Constitution Committee of the Knesset.

Diskin's research focuses on comparative politics, democracy, game theory, electoral systems and voting behavior. During the 2000s he published (often in conjunction with Moshe Koppel) two solutions to John Nash’s bargaining problem, a solution of the Voting Power measurement, a proof of the association between ‘strategic non-voting’ and ‘decisiveness’ of electoral competitions in the United States and Britain in the twentieth century, a proof of homogeneity in Swiss referendums, and a new measure of electoral malapportionment, volatility and disproportionality.

Diskin often appears as a political analyst on the Israeli and international media. In the 1980s and the early 1990s, he chaired the Cadets’ Committee of the Israeli Ministry of Foreign Affairs. Since the 1990s he has served as the statistician of the Central Committee of Elections in Israel. He is known as a political centrist and was one of the founders of the Third Way party in 1996.

== Literary and artistic career ==
For his non-academic and artistic work, Diskin uses the pen name “Bertie.” Diskin has written and illustrated several children books, among them “Gorgozula" and "The Mice and the Magic Ball. He co-authored a book on the World Soccer Championships (“Mondial”) with his son Tommer. Diskin has published two satirical works (On the Sinking Ship and The Lagado Travel). In 2008 he published The Presidents – Ha’Nesi’im), a book about American presidents.

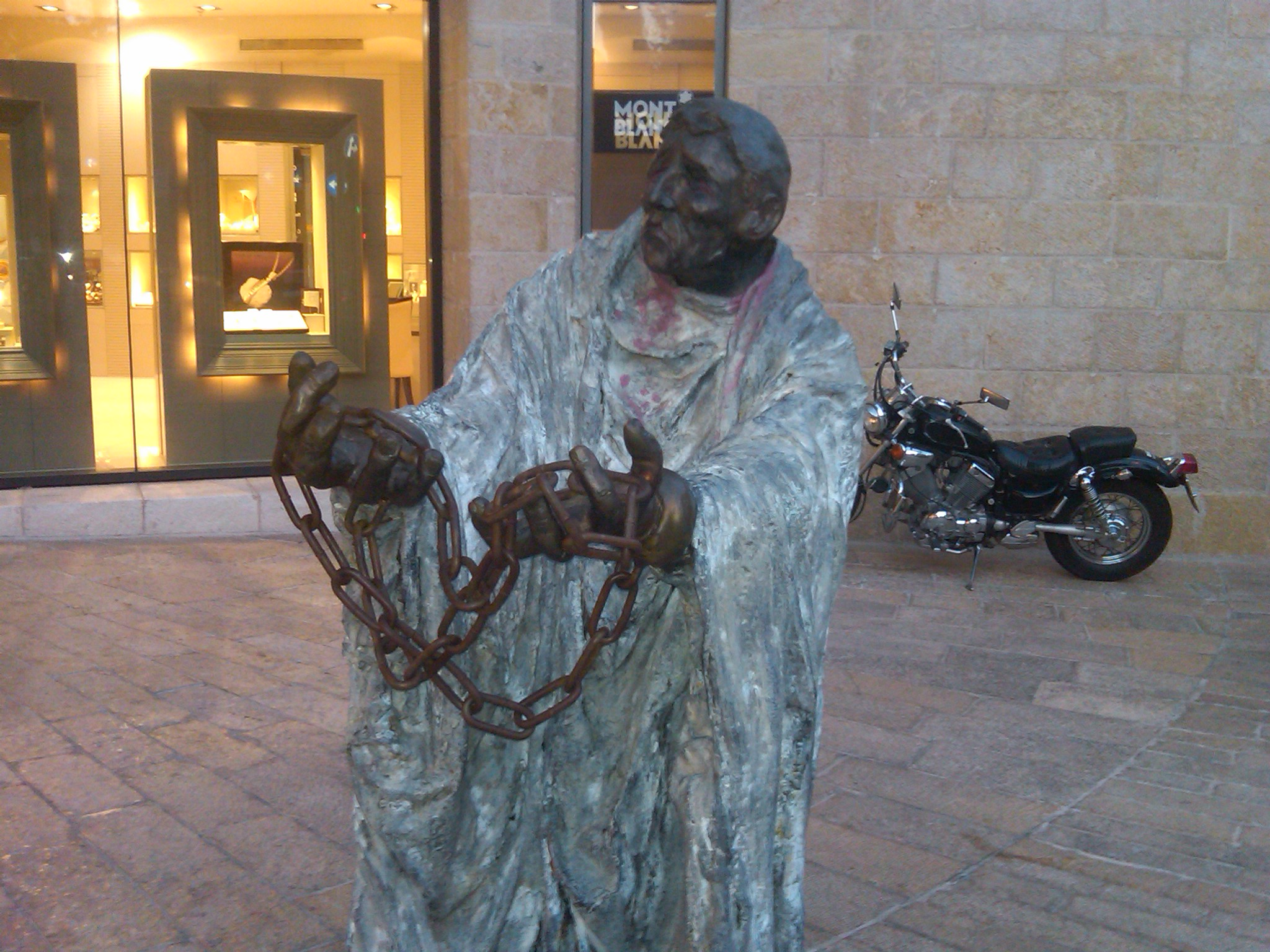
Professor Diskin's Statue Featured at Mamilla Mall in Jerusalem, Israel

== Published works ==
- Bertie (A. Diskin), On the Sinking Ship, Jerusalem: Akadamon, 1998, (Hebrew)
- Diskin, A., The Last Days in Israel: Understanding the New Israeli Democracy, London: Frank Cass, 2003
- Bertie (A. Diskin), The Lagado Travel, Jerusalem: Maggie Publishers, 2003, (Hebrew)
- Diskin, A., Eschet-Schwarz A. and Felsenthal D., “Homogeneity, Heterogeneity and Direct Democracy: The Case of Swiss Referenda”, Canadian Journal of Political Science, June 2007, 40(2), pp. 317–342
- Diskin, A. and Felsenthal, D.S, “Individual Rationality and Bargaining”, Public Choice, 2007, 133:25-29.
- Hazan, R.Y., and Diskin, A., “The February 2009 Parliamentary Election in Israel”, Electoral Studies, 2009.
- Koppel, M., and Diskin, A., “Measuring Disproportionality, Volatility and Malapportionment: Axiomatization and Solutions”, Social Choice and Welfare, 2009.
- Diskin, A., and Koppel, M., “Voting Power: An Information Theory Approach”, Social Choice and Welfare, 2009.
- Diskin, A., “Israel”, European Journal of Political Research, December 2009.
- Abramson, P.R., Aldrich, J.H., Blais, A., Diamond, M., Diskin, A., Indridason, I.H., Lee, D.J., and Levine, R., “Comparing Strategic Voting under FPTP and PR”, Comparative Political Studies, March 2010, 43(3).
