= Jeff Yass =

American businessman (born 1959)

- Born: Jeffrey Steven Yass; July 1958 (age 68); Queens, New York, U.S.
- Education: Binghamton University (BA); New York University (attended)
- Political party: Republican
- Other political affiliations: Libertarian
- Spouse: Janine Coslett
- Children: 4

Jeffrey Steven Yass (born July 1958) is an American billionaire businessman. According to Forbes, Yass had a net worth of US$77.8 billion as of September 2026, up from $27.6 billion in April 2024. The richest man in Pennsylvania, he is also the 25th richest in the world. He is a registered Libertarian who gives money to conservative super PACs including Club for Growth Action and the Protect Freedom Political Action Committee. He and his wife Janine Yass are supporters of school choice, a cause to which they have donated tens of millions of dollars.

Yass is the co-founder and managing director of the Philadelphia-based trading and technology firm Susquehanna International Group (SIG) and a major investor in TikTok. After Yass and US President Trump met in March 2024, Trump went from supporting a ban on TikTok to opposing a ban. In 2002, Yass joined the executive advisory council of the Cato Institute and is a member of the executive advisory council. He donated approximately $100 million during the 2024 US election cycle to Republican Party groups and campaigns.

== Early life and education ==
Yass was born in 1958 in Queens, New York City, and grew up there in a middle-class Jewish family.

Yass attended public schools in Queens, graduating from Bayside High School in 1975. He earned a Bachelor of Arts in mathematics and economics from Binghamton University. He pursued graduate studies in economics at New York University.

== Career ==
While at the State University of New York at Binghamton in the 1970s, Yass and five fellow students became friends and in 1987 co-founded Susquehanna International Group (SIG), the largest trader of liquid stocks in the US. In the 1970s and early 1980s, before establishing his trading firm, Yass was a professional gambler, winning sums from poker and horse betting.

In 2001, Yass appeared as one of 76 Revolutionary Minds in Philadelphia magazine.

Billionaire trader Israel Englander sponsored Yass for a seat on the Philadelphia Stock Exchange, and SIG was initially run from an office at the Exchange. His father, Gerald Yass, played an integral role in founding the company, contributing his expertise as a Chartered Professional Accountant (CPA) and helping to build SIG’s back-office bookkeeping operations. Gerald remained actively involved with the firm for decades, providing crucial support to its early infrastructure. In 2021, SIG generated almost one-tenth of the market making trade volume in exchange-traded funds.

== Political activities ==
=== US federal and state contributions ===
Yass has contributed significant sums to political efforts. In 2015, Yass donated $2.3 million to a super PAC supporting Rand Paul's presidential candidacy. He and his wife contributed just over $5 million in 2016. In 2018 he donated $3.8 million to the Club for Growth, and $20.7 million in 2020. In the 2020 election cycle, Yass was one of the ten largest political donors in the United States donating $25.3 million, all to Republican candidates. During the 2022 primary elections, Yass spent at least $18 million, including contributions in support of Republican Bill McSwain, who unsuccessfully sought the Republican nomination for governor of Pennsylvania.

While primarily donating to Republicans, he also donated $1 million to the Moderate PAC which was set up to support Democratic incumbents against progressive primary challengers during the 2024 election cycle. He donated approximately $100 million during the 2024 US election cycle to Republican groups and campaigns, including $6 million in political contributions via the Commonwealth Leaders Fund PAC, supporting Republican Dave Sunday over Democrat Eugene DePasquale in the 2024 Pennsylvania Attorney General election.

In the first half of 2025, Yass donated $16 million to MAGA Inc., a super PAC that supports Donald Trump, which was the highest recorded donation during that period. He donated $10 million to Vivek Ramaswamy’s gubernatorial super PAC in 2025. In 2026, Yass and his wife Janine Yass spent over $89.3 million in political contributions, donating $20,000,000 to Ramaswamy’s gubernatorial super PAC, $16,000,000 to MAGA Inc., and $15,000,000 to Club for Growth Action.

=== Foreign contributions ===
In March 2021, the Israeli newspaper Haaretz reported that Jeff Yass and Arthur Dantchik were behind a large portion of the donations to the Kohelet Policy Forum, whose worldview is based on nationalism, low taxes and market freedom. The Kohelet Policy Forum was responsible for the 2023 Israeli judicial reform proposal.

Also according to Haaretz, Yass is a major supporter of Israeli conservative think tanks. In April 2024, The Guardian reported that Jeff Yass donated $16 million to anti-Muslim and pro-Israel groups.

=== School choice ===
Yass and his wife strongly support school choice, with Janine Yass writing a 2017 opinion piece for The Washington Examiner in support of then-incoming Secretary of Education Betsy DeVos's views at school choice and the couple writing an op-ed in The Philadelphia Inquirer in 2023 advocating for parental school choice in Pennsylvania. In November 2021, he donated $5 million to the School Freedom Fund, a PAC that ran ads for Republican candidates running in the 2022 election cycle nationwide. From 2010 to 2022, Yass contributed $41.7 million to Students First political action committee. Yass co-founded the PAC, which supports the school choice movement.

=== TikTok ===
In September 2023, The Wall Street Journal reported that Yass, an investor in TikTok's parent firm ByteDance, is a major donor to US politicians who have opposed restrictions on TikTok. After Yass and Trump met in March 2024 at a Club for Growth event, Trump went from supporting a ban on TikTok to opposing a ban. At the same time Yass's SIG bought a substantial share in Digital World Acquisition Corp (DWAC), which it had been acquiring since 2021, providing Trump with a massive influx of money at a time when he faced mounting legal expenses. DWAC merged in 2024 with Trump Media, the company that launched Truth Social in 2022. A subsequent article by The Philadelphia Inquirer explained that as a market-maker, SIG also shorted the stock, per common market-maker practice, and did not hold an economic position in Trump Media but profited by managing trades in shares and derivatives. According to SIG filings with the Securities and Exchange Commission (SEC), the company sold its shares and liquidated the shorts after the merged company began trading as Trump Media.

== Wealth and taxes ==
Yass is the richest resident of Pennsylvania since 2022.

In 2022, an investigation by ProPublica, based on a review of tax returns it obtained, court documents, and securities filings, found that Yass engaged in tax avoidance, through Susquehanna trading strategies that "push legal boundaries" to reduce tax liability. ProPublica estimated "that if Yass' tax returns had resembled those of his competitors" (specifically, Ken Griffin, John Overdeck, and David Siegel), Yass "would have paid $1 billion more in federal income taxes" during the period 2013 to 2018.

== Philanthropy ==
In December 2001, following the aftermath of the September 11 attacks, he announced a donation to the charitable fund established by the Port Authority of New York and New Jersey to assist the victims. He has supported Save the Children, "Spirit of Golf Foundation", People's Emergency Center Families First building, and the Franklin Institute's Franklin Family Funfest Committee.

Jeff and Janine Yass founded the Yass Prize for Sustainable, Transformational, Outstanding, and Permissionless (STOP) education, which was launched during the COVID-19 pandemic. This initiative aims to recognize and support innovative and alternative education models. In 2022, the Yass Prize awarded over $20 million, including a $1 million grand prize to the Arizona Autism Charter Schools for their individualized learning programs.

In November 2025, Yass donated $100 million to the University of Austin, founded in 2021 by Bari Weiss and others. It was the largest donation the institution had received since its founding in 2021. The university's website says it will never charge tuition.

== Family and personal life ==
He is the son of Gerald and Sybil Yass. He has a sister, Carole. Sybil Yass died in December 2001. Gerald Yass died on January 6, 2024, aged 94, in Boca Raton, Florida.

Yass is married to Janine Coslett. They have lived in Haverford in Lower Merion Township, Pennsylvania, for some years. They have four children; two sons, Robbie and Doug, and two daughters, Anna and Sophie.
