= Yisrael Harel =

Israeli journalist and settler

- ישראל הראל
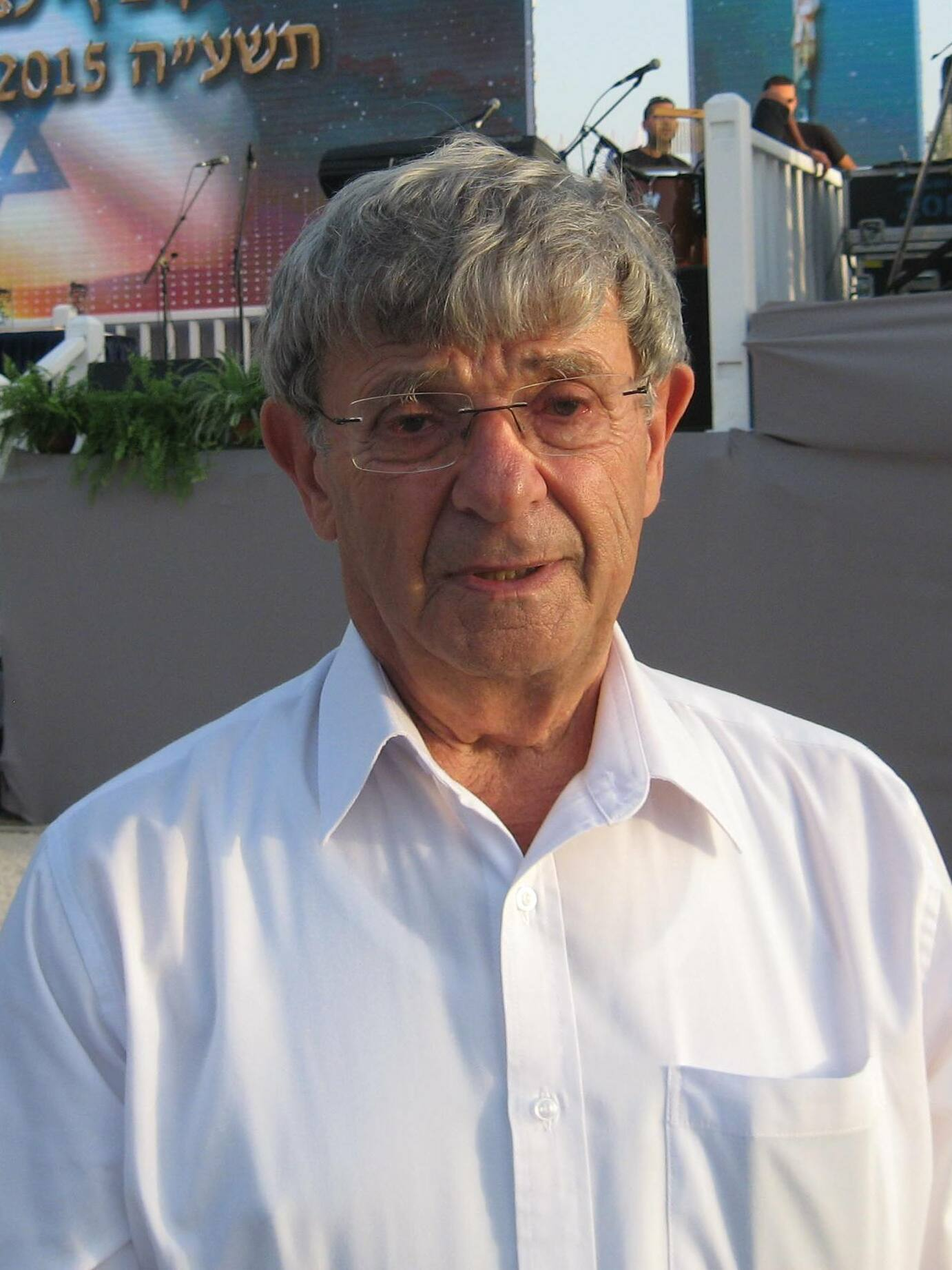
- Born: 1938 (age 87–88)

Yisrael Harel (Hebrew: ישראל הראל; born 1938) is an Israeli journalist and settler.

Harel emigrated to Mandatory Palestine in 1947. He fought in both the Six-Day War and the Yom Kippur War.

In 2015, Harel was awarded the Moskowitz Prize for Zionism. In 2019, Harel was awarded an honorary doctorate by Bar-Ilan University.
