= Van der Moolen =

Dutch equity trading firm

Van der Moolen NV.
- Company type: Public
- Industry: Financial services
- Founded: Amsterdam, Netherlands (1892)
- Headquarters: Schiphol, Netherlands
- Products: Trading
- Revenue: ▲EUR110.8 million (2007)
- Net income: ▼EUR 77.7 million (2007)
- Total equity: US $1040 million (2007)
- Number of employees: 440

Van der Moolen was a Dutch equity trading firm, with its headquarters located in Amsterdam. They were mainly active in the United States and in Europe, particularly in the Netherlands, France, Germany, Switzerland and the United Kingdom. Van der Moolen, which at its peak was one of the largest registered market makers on the New York Stock Exchange, filed for bankruptcy in September 2009 after mounting losses.

Originally known as Van der Moolen & Co., it was founded in July 1892 as a 'jobber' or 'hoekman' which traded in equities and bonds. The company started its expansion in the derivatives markets in the late 1970s. Van der Moolen became a limited liability company in December 1986 and soon afterwards was listed on the Amsterdam Stock Exchange (AEX). The company's shares were also listed on the New York Stock Exchange ('NYSE') in October 2001.

In 2001, Van der Moolen launched VDM Bonds to provide fixed income liquidity in less-than-wholesale transaction sizes to banks and other intermediaries. VDM Bonds was sold to Zions Bancorporation in March 2004 after its management team left the company. In January 2006, VDM acquired Curvalue, a Dutch trading company specialized in derivative trading. In late 2006, VDM acquired the assets of London-based prop trading firm Hills Independent Traders Ltd. In 2008, VDM UK's proprietary equity and futures trading unit was closed after an ill-fated move to a new site in Colchester.

On the New York Stock Exchange, Van der Moolen served as specialist until 2007 when it sold the activities to Lehman Brothers. At one point, Van der Moolen USA's specialist book had represented 15% of the NYSE listed common stocks and accounted 11% of the NYSE's volume. Regulatory changes which slashed margins for market makers and allowed a flood of new competition for trading volume significantly impaired the profitability of this VDM unit. Previously in 2003, Van der Moolen Specialists became subject to an investigation by the SEC on allegations of front running. In 2004, Van der Moolen reached a settlement with the SEC and paid a fine of $57.7 million. Some employees were convicted of fraud, while others (Robert Scavone Jr.) were later acquitted.

On August 10, 2009, Van der Moolen requested protection from its creditors a short time after opening its new headquarters near Amsterdam airport. The new HQ office project had been reportedly delivered on time and under budget. On September 10, 2009, Van der Moolen filed for bankruptcy a week later. The company assets in the Netherlands were liquidated in January 2010 with an auction raising Euro 400,000 against creditor claims for Euro 28.3 million. An announcement of a tax reclaim from the German Tax authorities arrived a week after the bankruptcy filing. The Euro 32 million tax reclaim was transferred to VDM's liquidator in October 2009 (with a condition and it may still have to be returned). This tax refund could have saved the company—but simply arrived too late. Van der Moolen's dealings are being investigated by the Dutch market regulator AFM.

As of 23 December 2010, Van der Moolen shares were no longer listed on the Euronext Amsterdam exchange.

According to a report dated 13 May 2011 by the Enterprise Chamber of the Amsterdam Appeals Court, prior to bankruptcy Van der Moolen's management did not seem in control of the company's dividend arbitrage activities, and attention to capital management and external financing was limited. The Dutch investor group VEB and insurer ASR Nederland NV had asked the Enterprise Chamber to investigate the firm's management. The VEB also asked for the court to assess mismanagement and damage claims.

By May 2018, Van der Moolen's trustees announced that all creditors, including a number of former employees of the company, could fully recover their claims against the company including interest.

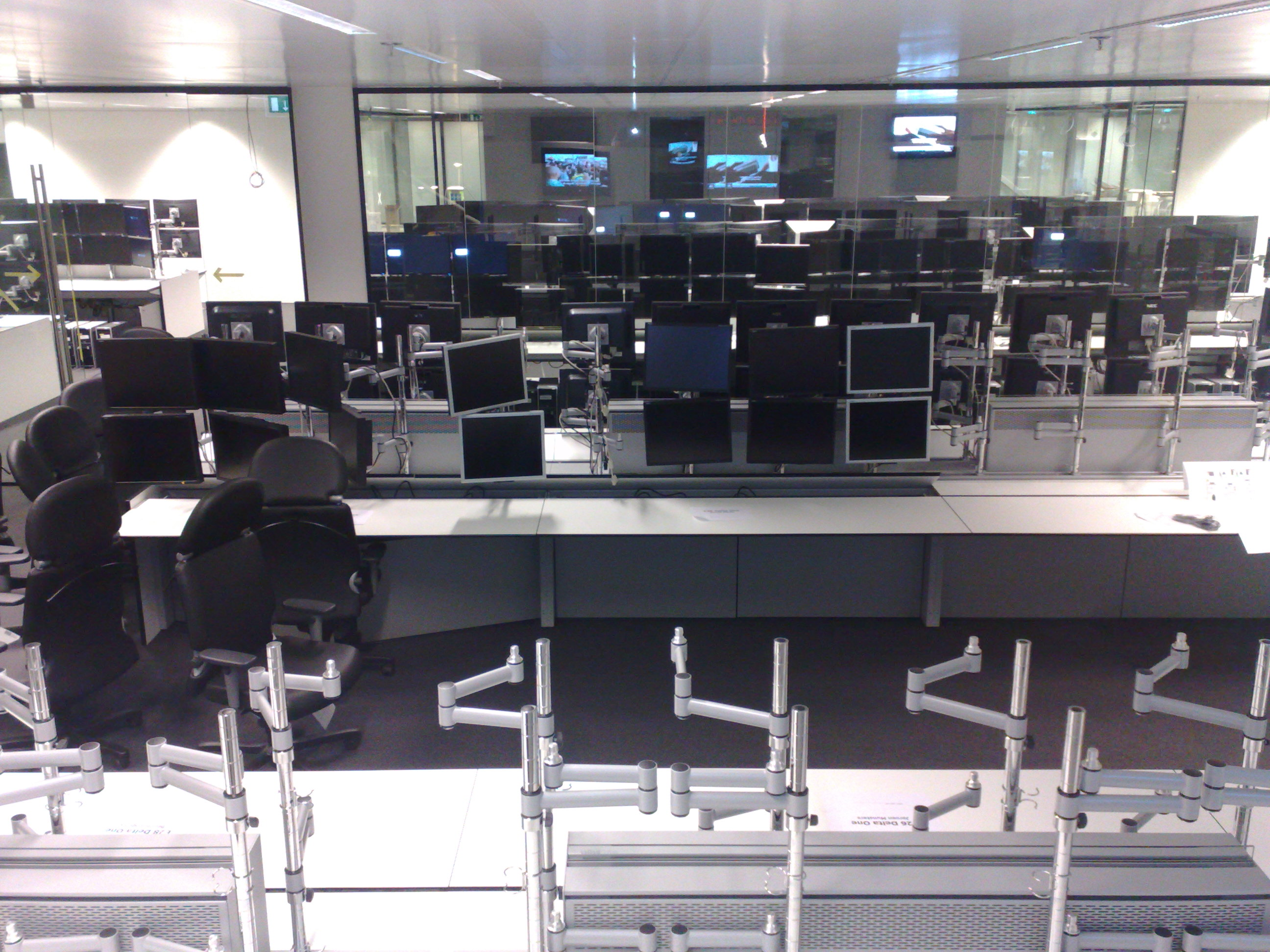
Van der Moolen Schiphol Airport trading floor

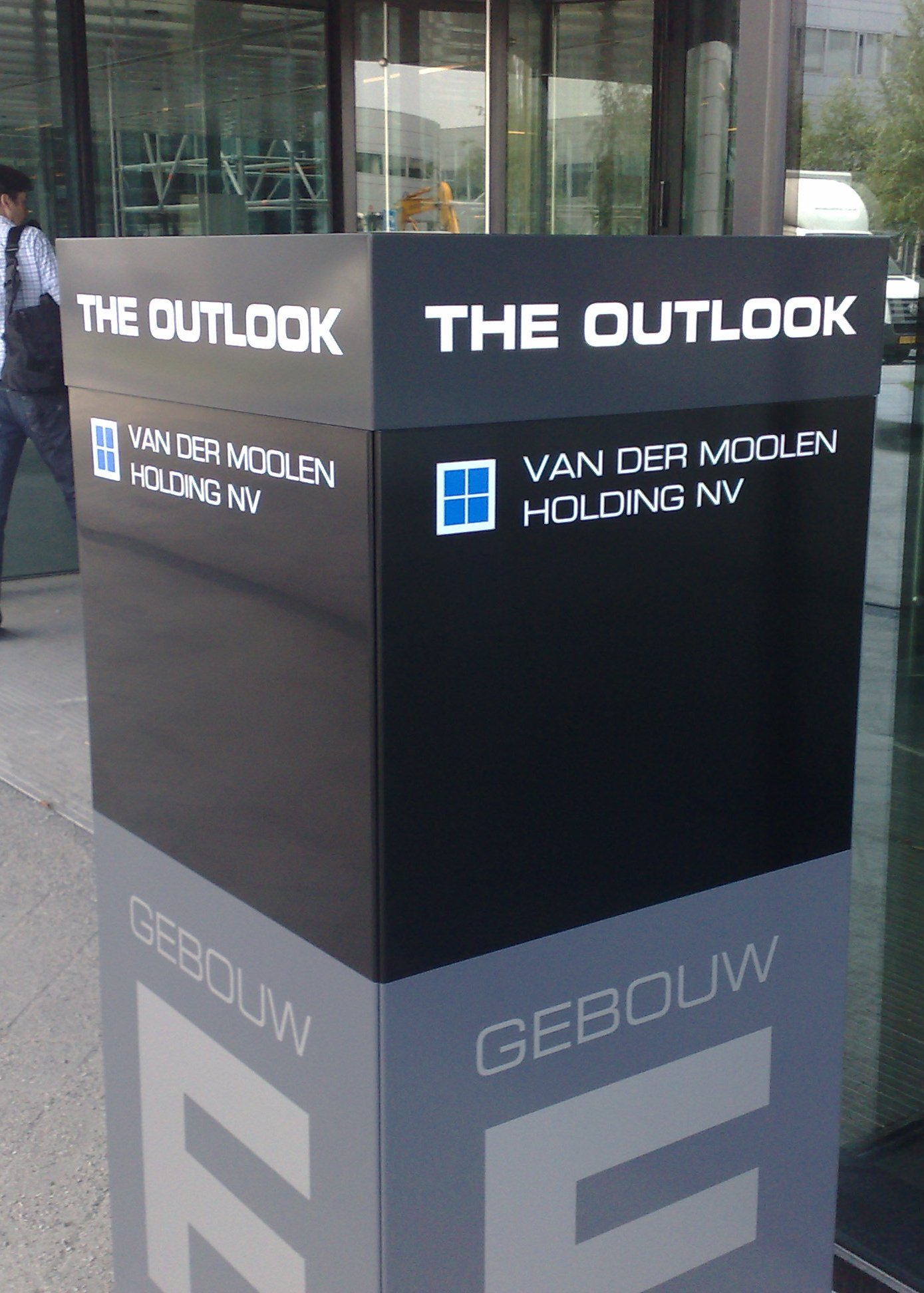
Van der Moolen Amsterdam Airport offices

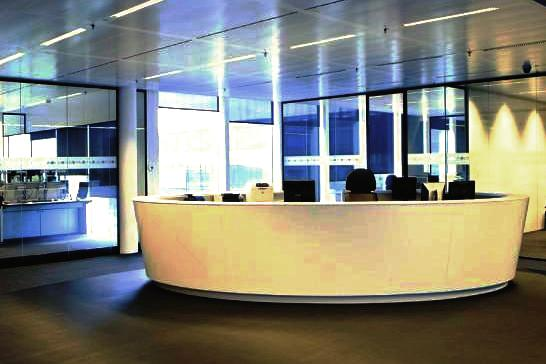
Van der Moolen Airport office reception
