= Cultural impact of TikTok =

Cultural impact of the video sharing app

Logo of TikTok

The online video platform TikTok has had a significant worldwide social, political, and cultural impact since its global launch in September 2016. The platform has rapidly grown its userbase since its launch and surpassed 2 billion downloads in October 2020. It became the world's most popular website, ahead of Google, for the year 2021. As of 2025, TikTok reached 2 billion users, utilizing the platform on a monthly basis. The platform attracts users around the world and consists of a variety of content such as music, food, fashion, and news information.

== Cultural impact ==
=== Music ===
TikTok has been noted by many media outlets as having a major influence in the music industry by encouraging engagement from a diversified population of users. American artist Lil Nas X notably rose to fame after his song "Old Town Road" went viral on TikTok in 2019. He acknowledged the platform's influence in popularizing the song, saying "[TikTok] really boosted the song ... I credit them a lot". Doja Cat has also been noted as an artist who achieved mainstream popularity thanks to her success on TikTok. Insider noted in 2020 that "one of the most popular, pervasive dances of all time" from TikTok was set to Say So, which became her first no.1 hit on the Billboard Hot 100. Pitchfork also noted Doja Cat's "Astonishing, unprecedented TikTok reign", saying that before her fame on TikTok, "Many people didn't fully register Doja Cat as a star".

When it was launched, TikTok allowed users to upload videos that ranged from 3 seconds to 1 minute. The short video length limit led to users making sped-up versions of songs to use in their videos. This allowed them to fit more of the song in their video. Some artists, including SZA and Steve Lacy, released official sped-up versions of their songs after unofficial sped-up remixes of their songs went viral on the platform.

TikTok has also helped popularize older songs. Fleetwood Mac's song Dreams re-entered the Billboard Hot 100 over 40 years after its release after a video that featured the song went viral on the platform. Dan Whateley from Insider noted that songs could "Rise up organically on the app even if they've been outside the mainstream for decades".

In September 2023, Billboard and TikTok launched a new chart called the TikTok Billboard Top 50 to track music that is popular on the platform in the United States.

Some artists have complained of a "burnout" due to TikTok's massive role in the music marketing process. American singer Halsey said in 2022 that her label was stopping her from releasing a new song if she didn't agree to "Fake a viral moment on TikTok".

Additionally, in February 2024, TikTok experienced a temporary removal of music from Universal Music Group (UMG) due to a licensing dispute over royalty payments, which UMG argued undervalued their catalog compared to a typical "pay-per-view" royalty model in streaming services. Existing videos using UMG tracks were muted, creating a "radio silence" effect. According to Harvard Business School professor Elie Ofek, "When UMG removed its music, artists with partial catalog presence on TikTok saw a 1–3 percent decrease in streams on other platforms for their songs that weren’t previously available on TikTok." While major artists were affected, some smaller independent artists gained visibility and traction on the platform without competition from UMG's catalog. After 3 months the two companies reached an agreement, and the music was restored to the platform on May 1, 2024.

=== News and information distribution ===
TikTok has been a growing source of news for users since COVID-19, reflecting 20% of its global audience. Pew Research Center found that the percentage of US adults who regularly got their news from TikTok more than tripled from 3% of US adults in 2020, to 10% in 2022, and14% in 2023. The percentage of US adult TikTok users who regularly get their news from the platform increased from 22% to 33% in the same time period. This is much lower than the percentage of Facebook and Twitter users who regularly get their news from those platforms. However, unlike with TikTok, the proportion of Facebook and Twitter users who get their news from those platforms declined every year from 2020 to 2022.

As of 2026, Pew Research Center suggests 59% of TikTok users gain their news from this social media platform within America. In comparison, around 58% of TikTok users within Kenya utilized the platform for their news source within a week span in June 2026. Additionally, 55% of Thailand's TikTok users were seen utilizing the platform, as well for their news source consumption within a week's time frame in June.

An increasing proportion of Generation Z internet users have also started using TikTok as their preferred search engine over Google. Pew Research Center recoginizes 39% of young adults gaining their news from this platform within America.

=== Politics ===
As the popularity of TikTok grows, more and more individuals join the platform. Hence, current political ideologies are being spread on the platform. TikTok has turned into a political landscape, where young individuals are consuming far-right related content on a daily basis. TikTok has allowed for far-right supporters to have a platform where radical views are naturalized. Statistics have shown that roughly 14% of adults regularly get their election, and political news through the platform. TikTok has addressed multiple hateful content, related to far-right ideologies, which is being banned and removed from their platform. However, most hateful content (related to religion, identity, race) have gone unnoticed by the system until December 2019. Although user protection has improved, hateful videos still go undetected by the platform. In light of recent political tensions on the app, the usage of violent commentary has been more prevalent on the app, more-so from the left wing commenters. An article that evaluated the level of politically violent comments on the app concluded that leftist content also alienates what is perceived as the "enemy" at larger rates and even are more likely to make violent references as well. Additionally, those comments were statistically less inclined to express religious beliefs openly. On the flip side, right wing content relies more heavily on toxicity to spread a message and gain more views. Since TikTok functions on an algorithmic system, individuals can get more exposure to hateful content without intending to do so.

There is also a large aspect of political misinformation that is apparent on the app. Every social media app is susceptible of misinformation as it is a platform for anyone to post any opinion, or recall of events. Tactics such as sensational headlines, hyperbolic language, and emotional triggers all aid in gaining the attention of viewers Moving forward, politicians have been utilizing TikTok as a tactic for spreading messages and persuading younger generations that are very active on the app. For example, in the last presidential race, the top two contenders created TikTok accounts in hopes of capitalizing off of the slang and humor that GenZ is familiar with on the app. Both candidates followed through with this idea as a way to give more visibility of their campaigns and de-influence younger voters from the opposing candidate. Studies have shown that a heavy presence of politics on the app sways political identities of users on the app on various levels. A study was conducted that concluded that approximately one third of the total participants claimed that their political identity had changed a significant amount after using TikTok on a regular basis. Moving further through identity the focus is aimed at Black Americans and their participation in routines on TikTok to boycott and Buycott markets in attempts to advance politics surrounding race. These routines were done in efforts to claim and build identity and promote equality.

As for news consumption globally spanning across social media platforms, there are 48 markets worldwide that are heavily gravitating towards news via social media. Roughly 77% of people worldwide gain their daily news consumption from videos via social media platforms weekly, with TikTok averaging 20% of their users globally utilizing their platform as their main news outlet. TikTok can be a useful tool with quick information, via short videos on specific news topics. However, there has been a considerable amount of disinformation spread throughout the platform, that has been seen to cause tension amongst communities, countries, etc. For example, as mentioned by the Australian Institute of International Affairs, during two election periods in previous years within Southeast Asia, TikTok created political polarization and ultimately interfered by recreating images of political officials running for office. There have been various issues associated with disinformation across the platform, which in some cases has resulted in banning TikTok altogether. The Australian Institute of International Affairs reported in 2024, that nearly 34 countries banned the platform due to posed security risks, deception, political disinformation, etc. There were other countries that banned TikTok early on, such as India in 2020, as there was tension arising between them and China.There have been major concerns addressed regarding access to personal information that TikTok gains from its users. The United States was another country that took the intitiave towards banning TikTok in 2024, due to concerns over national security and protecting American users private information.

=== Food ===
TikTok content is able to influence the food choices of its users. A 2023 study of teenagers found that TikTok content influences both short-term food decisions, such as trying a new food item or recipe, and long-term food decisions, like dietary adjustments.

TikTok has also led to an increase in custom orders at restaurants, known on the platform as menu hacks. In 2021, some Starbucks baristas complained of an increase in custom drink orders that went viral on TikTok, but were not officially on the companies menu. In 2023, Chipotle Mexican Grill added a viral TikTok custom orders, created by two influencers as a permanent item to its menu after receiving an influx of orders for the item. The same year, several videos of different Waffle House branches refused to serve custom orders that went viral on the platform.

When it comes to travel, TikTok provides the ability for users to share popular destinations, restaurants, etc. that ultimately entice tourism. In a study conducted in Amsterdam, they found that tourism is being reshaped by TikTok's platform, through influencers posting immaculate videos of food, posing them as a "must try" when visiting the area. This has been posed as an issue, as some food destinations are not built to sustain crowds as they become viral.

=== Fashion ===
The huge audience that TikTok videos are able to reach compared to other platforms, allows a small number of viral videos about a similar style of clothing to create a new microtrend. The high quantity of new microtrends produced by TikTok users has increased the popularity of fast fashion retailers such as Shein, who are able to rapidly reproduce, and sell items that are trending on TikTok. Fashion trends and fads that have become popular through social media platforms have collectively become known as "internet aesthetics".

Haul videos are popular amongst TikTok fashion creators. Shein successfully worked with influencers on TikTok and Instagram to grow its business by sending them free clothing, and discount codes to share with their followers. This partnership ultimately allows influencers to a gain commission on sales. Influencers are also paid to post haul videos for Shein, utilizing the free clothing that the fast-fashion company gives them. The popularity of haul videos on TikTok also results in users advertising Shein for free, by making and posting their own Shein hauls. Through culture surrounding influencers on the TikTok's platform, they control the dynamic, as far as creating trends such as clothing items. Through the social media platforms endorsement, they are able to create trends and high demand, such as in the fast-fashion realm. In fact, the global fast-fashion market is projected to grow substantially by the year of 2027, estimating 185 billion dollars in revenue.

When it comes to the beauty realm, ByteDance's other app known as Lemon8, combines elements of TikTok with influencers endorsement over recommended beauty products, fashion inspiration etc. Users using the app are able to customize their "For You Page" based on categories they select, such as beauty, fashion, travel, etc. Thus, it creates consumer culture by the precedence of influencer endorsements over products that become sought after items, similar to the fast-fashion realm, like Shein.

=== Cosmetic surgery ===
Videos regarding cosmetic surgeries are very popular on TikTok. In January 2022, videos with hashtags related to plastic surgery composed over 29 billion views combined on the platform. TikTok and Instagram have led to an increase in the number of cosmetic surgeries performed on young people.

In 2021, Plastic and Reconstructive Surgery published an article that found that plastic surgeons were among the earliest adopters of social media, and at the time the article was published, it was found that at least five plastic surgeons had surpassed 1 million followers on TikTok. The article noted that some surgeons were influencers on the platform and had the ability to influence public perception. A 2021 study, published by the University of South Florida found that content posted on TikTok by plastic surgeons helped legitimize plastic surgery, by educating their viewers and reducing their fear of the surgeries. Plastic surgery is also normalized by the TikTok algorithmic system, which shows users more videos related to their interest in cosmetic surgery. An individuals "For You Page" showcases these types of surgeries, which can make it appear more popular globally than it actually is.

TikTok does not allow direct paid advertisements of cosmetic surgeries on its platform, but cosmetic surgery clinics are able to promote their services using normal unpaid posts. They can also pay influencers or give them free surgeries, in exchange for the influencer posting a video about their cosmetic surgery experience.

Cosmetic procedures that have trended on TikTok include: (1.) rhinoplasties, (2.) buccal fat removals, (3.) and botox injections. Cosmetic procedures sometimes trend in the form of an internet challenge on TikTok. The "#Nosejobcheck" challenge involves users posting videos of their noses before and after pictures of their rhinoplasties; with the addition of a specific background sound for the challenge used in the videos.Tiktok has been normalizing cosmetic procedures and setting high beauty standards for its users, by celebrities and influencers who have had surgeries done to enhance their appearance. There has been studies showing increased anxiety and shame surrounding the exposure to videos that normalize this content. In addition, there have been studies reflecting negative moods and comparing one's body to others online, when exposed to these TikTok videos.

It has become fad for young women to begin "preventative maintenance" to keep up the appearance of looking younger. There has also been growing popularity amongst TikTok and Instagram influencers traveling to other countries, in order to have cheaper cosmetic surgeries. However, as mentioned by the Department of Health and Social Care in the United Kingdom, there have been reported mishaps of surgeries in other countries that have inflicted serious injuries. The department in the UK considers it advisable for individuals to research surgeries fully before committing, and to proceed with caution.

=== Literature ===
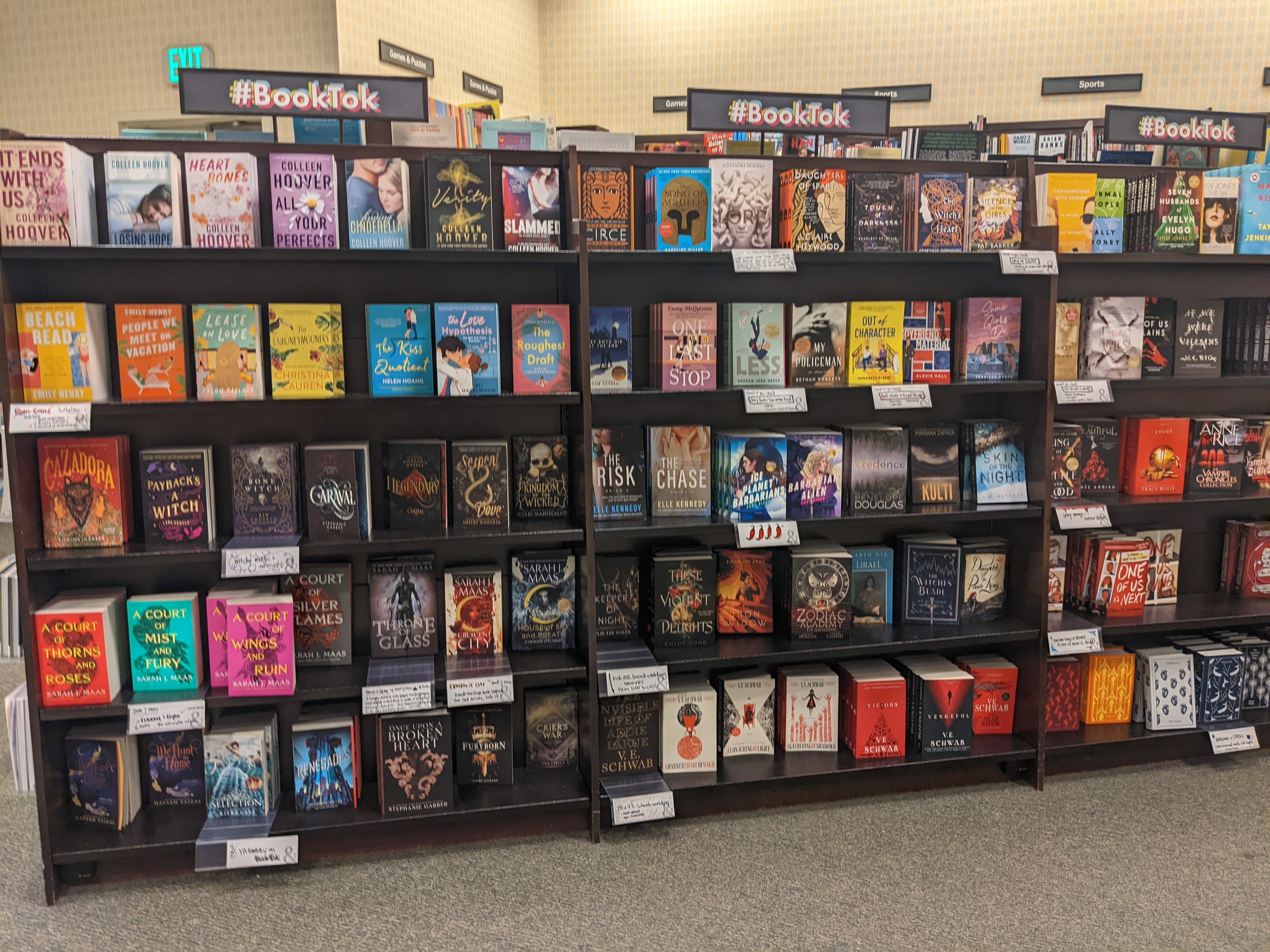
The BookTok section at a Barnes & Noble store

Users within the TikTok platform created videos discussing and recommending books that collectively become known as BookTok by users. This is an online community in of itself, as individuals who share this common interest in reading, come to the platform to discuss and recommend books. Books that become popular on BookTok often experience a large increase in sales. The author Colleen Hoover, who rose to popularity on BookTok saw six of her books reach the top ten of The New York Times Best Seller list in the paperback trade fiction section in October 2022. An analyst from the book sales tracking service BookScan said that BookTok "Remains the industry's most important platform for discovering new writers". Some publishers have paid popular BookTok influencers to recommend books to capitalise off of the phenomenon.

The success of BookTok content on the platform lead TikTok's parent company, ByteDance, to launch their own publishing company called 8th Note Press in 2023. During the Pandemic, most Barnes & Noble bookstores were shut down, which led to e-book consumption and BookTok's rise in popularity as a community of literature enthusiasts.As of 2025, TikTok Newsroom proclaimed that throughout Europe BookTok has sold over 50 million books. This community is continuously growing, and has thus far created over 75 million social media posts worldwide.

=== Medication shortages ===
Trends on TikTok have contributed to the shortages of some medications. Danish pharmaceutical company Novo Nordisk, produces three medications containing the active ingredient semaglutide. One of the drugs, Wegovy, is certified by the Food and Drug Administration for the treatment of obesity. The other two, Ozempic and Rybelsus, are only certified for the treatment of diabetes. In 2022, the United States suffered shortages of Ozempic, after it became a trend on the platform to use the medications off-label for its weight loss effects. Australia's Therapeutic Goods Administration reported that Ozempic's popularity on TikTok had contributed to a global shortage of the medication. It recommended that doctors not prescribe the medication to new patients, and to prescribe alternative medications to existing patients when possible. By March 2023, TikTok videos posted with the hashtag #Ozempic had amassed 690 million views. As of 2026,

=== Mental health ===
TikTok has become a hub for mental health content, where users share personal experiences with depression and anxiety. While this has helped normalize conversations surrounding mental health, it also raises substantial concerns. Dr. Corey Basch, a public health professor, points out that TikTok's algorithm can create echo chambers. Users who engage with posts regarding anxiety or despair may find themselves bombarded with similar content, which can lead to harmful cycles. In young adults, studies have shown that increased usage of TikTok can contribute to the feeling of loneliness, anxiety, and depression. Other countries aside from America, are facing similar effects of TikTok consumption, in which they report body dysmorphia, depression, anxiety, and addiction to the platform itself. As mentioned by the National Library of Medicine, a study conducted in the United Kingdom found that the more time their subjects (young adults) spent on social media, the higher the depression rates there would be.

This surge in mental health discussions has also contributed to more young people self-diagnosing conditions, such as ADHD and anxiety before consulting a professional. Researchers are concerned about the influence of profit-driven motives, with the platform promoting mental health apps, and influencers sponsored by these companies. These services often advertise quick, quiz-based diagnoses, which may oversimplify complex issues. Additionally, misinformation is continuously growing problem, in which studies have found that some videos about therapies, like cognitive behavioral therapy, include inaccurate or misleading information.

=== Hustle culture ===
TikTok has played a significant role in shaping hustle culture, especially during the pandemic, ultimately blurring the lines between work and personal life. Individuals would share their daily routines on the social media platform, promoting the idea that constant work leads to personal success. However, this pressure towards making multiple sources of income has its downsides. A 2022 study, showcased 77% of employees feeling burnt out, which is a consequence of hustle culture.

That said, some creators are pushing back, showing that it's okay to slow down. For example, Jonathan Graziano's "Bones Day" trend encourages followers to take rest when they need it. TikTok also provides a wide range of content surrounding self-care, which was initially promoted during the Pandemic as a sort of coping mechanism.

=== Competing online platforms ===
TikTok is now the dominant social media platform amongst the newer generation. The popularity of TikTok has led other web services to adopt similar features, in order to compete with the mega social media platform. Instagram launched a short, vertical videos section called Instagram Reels to its app in 2020. YouTube followed with the release of YouTube Shorts in 2021. As of 2022, Facebook launched a videos tab on its app, that shows users a personalized selection of videos. The same year, Twitter announced that it would also be launching a short videos feature on their social media platform. The shopping platform known as Amazon, also added a scrolling feed with photos and videos of available products to its mobile app. In 2023, Spotify redesigned its home screen to have a similar scrolling interface to TikTok, as did Reddit by adding a separate video feed to its mobile app.

== Economic impacts ==
A 2023 study by Oxford Economics, showcased small and medium-sized enterprises in the United Kingdom, posting on TikTok to advertise their growth as businesses. They estimated that these advertisements, contributed £1.6 billion to the UK's gross domestic product in 2022, as a result of their TikTok activity.

In the United States, following up on a TikTok ban initiated by a previous administration, President Donald Trump paused the enforcement of the ban twice, granting a total extension of 180 days. The platform was set to be shut down unless it was acquired by a U.S.-based company within that period. As of the end of April, no final acquisition agreements had been announced, although several major firms—including Oracle, eBay, and Amazon—had reportedly submitted bids. During this time period, if the ban were to have remained permanent, California was projected to be the most affected state, due to its high concentration of TikTok influencers. In addition, they risked a potential loss in income tax revenue and broader implications for employment in the digital creator economy.

Social media platforms, in general have contributed to brand popularity through influencers paid endorsements. In addition TikTok ultimately plays an influential role within economics worldwide through their investments and global job opportunities. In the U.S. alone, TikTok has created over 410,000 jobs, while reportedly contributing $9.7 billion to America's economy within the creative sector. As for Japan's economy, TikTok Newsroom reported the platform's contribution of $3 billion, as of 2024, and has since provided over 26,000 jobs. TikTok Newsroom also reported, that the social media platform invested over €4.8 billion in some European countries economies, such as Germany, Italy, France, Beligum, and the Netherlands. TikTok has been reaching individuals globally, providing jobs through their various offices in North America, Africa, Asia Pacific, Europe, Latin America, and the Middle East.

=== Consumer behavior ===
Some researchers have noted TikTok's algorithmic system as a source of "attention economy," in which the social media platform entices its users to make purchases based on their consumer habits and interests. A 2021 study by Adweek and Morning Consult found that 49 percent of TikTok users bought goods/services after seeing them being discussed and/or promoted on the platform.

In 2023, the European Journal of Business and Management Research published a study that found that TikTok users were much more likely to trust products shown in high-quality TikTok videos, rather than products displayed at lower prices.

When products go viral on TikTok, the impact on sales can be significant. Stanley tumblers saw their revenue jump from $73 million in 2019, to $750 million in 2023 after going viral on the platform. Feta cheese sales soared by 200% in 2021 after the baked feta pasta recipe took off. CeraVe's sales increased by over 60% in 2020 as TikTok users turned to the brand during the Pandemic. Other items, like Cat Crack catnip and Isle of Paradise tanning spray, sold out within days after viral posts.

As of 2023, TikTok came out with a shopping feature called TikTok Shop, making it easy for users to buy products directly from a range of sellers. This feature lets businesses sell products directly on the platform, using tools like shoppable ads, product showcases, and creator partnerships in order to connect with their audiences while boosting sales. As of 2026, TikTok has incorporated newer features within their TikTok Shop, granting users the ability to shop in "real time" from the platform. This feature allows an individual to make a spontaneous purchase by clicking a link provided on the short-films in their feed. Additionally, they are able to join live-stream promotional videos of products, allowing users to purchase items with a click of a button. In the four days between Black Friday and Cyber Monday deals, TikTok generated over $500 million in sales as of 2025.
