= Rose Alenyo =

Rose Alenyo is a Ugandan medical doctor working at Kiruddu National Referral Hospital and Makerere University as Plastic and Reconstructive Surgeon. She serves as the head of Plastic and Reconstructive Surgery panel at the College of Surgeons of East, Central and Southern Africa (COSECSA). She lectures at College of Health Sciences Makerere University and the chair of Training Division Plastic and Burns Surgery. She has been involved in community outreaches since 2003. Alenyp is the first female plastic surgeon in Uganda and has conducted successful surgical procedures on patients.

== Career ==
Alenyo is part of the part of the leadership team at Africa Medical Advisory Council (AMAC). She is the founder of Smile Care Uganda, an organization providing free surgical services to children, and occasionally shares her knowledge in conferences and summits around the world, and a member of the Global Health Committee. She attends the United Nations Commission on the Status of Women.

== Personal life ==
Alenyo is a mother to four children.
