= Buccal fat pad =

Organ of the face

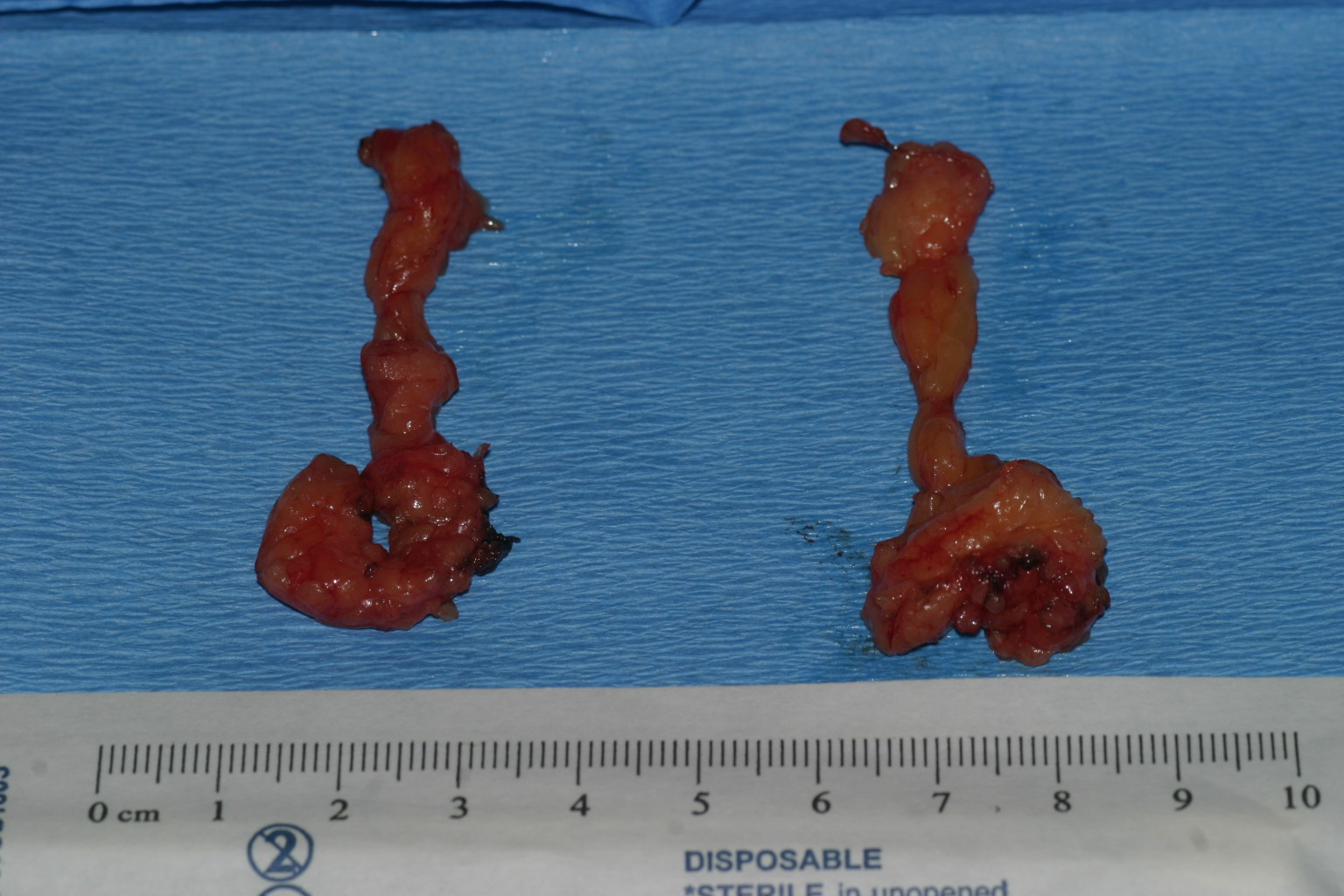
- Extracted buccal fat

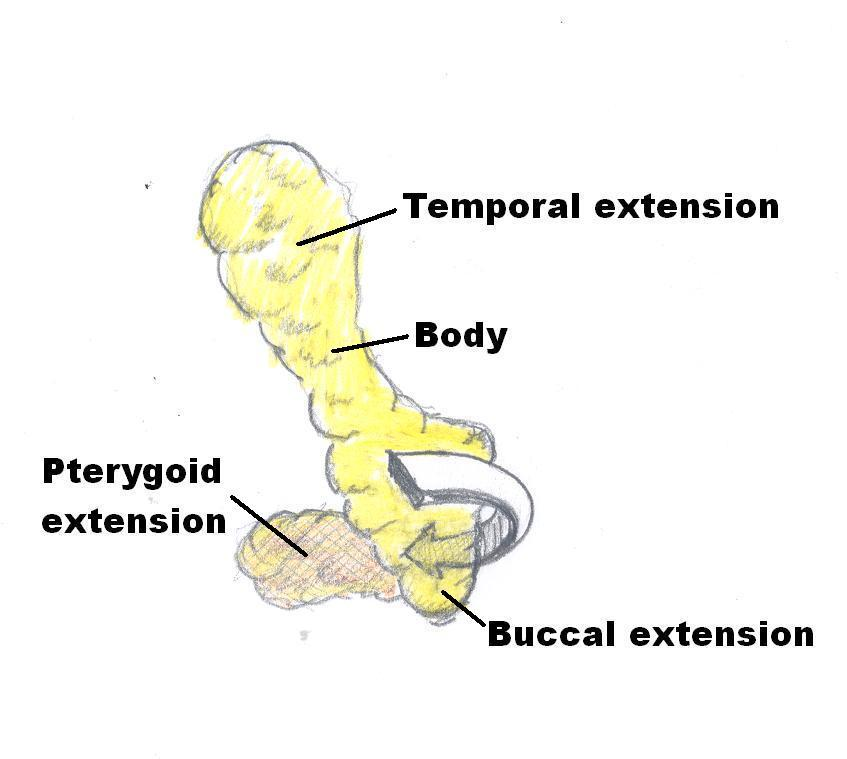
- Buccal fat pad diagram

Details

Identifiers
- Latin: corpus adiposum buccae
- TA98: A05.1.01.015
- TA2: 2141
- FMA: 59799

The buccal fat pad (also called Bichat’s fat pad, after Xavier Bichat, and the buccal pad of fat) is one of several encapsulated fat masses in the cheek. It is a deep fat pad located on either side of the face between the buccinator muscle and several more superficial muscles (including the masseter, the zygomaticus major, and the zygomaticus minor). The inferior portion of the buccal fat pad is contained within the buccal space. It should not be confused with the malar fat pad, which is directly below the skin of the cheek. It should also not be confused with jowl fat pads. It is implicated in the formation of hollow cheeks and the nasolabial fold, but not in the formation of jowls.

== Nomenclature and structure ==
The buccal fat pad is composed of several parts, although exactly how many parts seems to be a point of disagreement and no single consistent nomenclature of these parts has been observed. It was described as being divided into three lobes, the anterior, intermediate, and posterior, “according to the structure of the lobar envelopes, the formation of ligaments, and the source of the nutritional vessels”. Also, there are four extensions from the body of the buccal fat pad: the sublevator, the melolabial, the buccal, and the pterygoid. The nomenclature of these extensions derives from their location and proximal muscles.

The anterior lobe of the buccal fat surrounds the parotid duct, which conveys saliva from the parotid gland to the mouth. It is a triangular mass with one vertex at the buccinators, one at the levator labii superioris alaeque nasi, and one at the orbicularis oris. The intermediate lobe lies between the anterior and posterior lobes over the maxilla. The intermediate lobe seems to lose a significant amount of volume between childhood and adulthood. The posterior lobe of the buccal fat pad runs from the infraorbital fissure and temporal muscle to the upper rim of the mandible and back to the mandibular ramus.

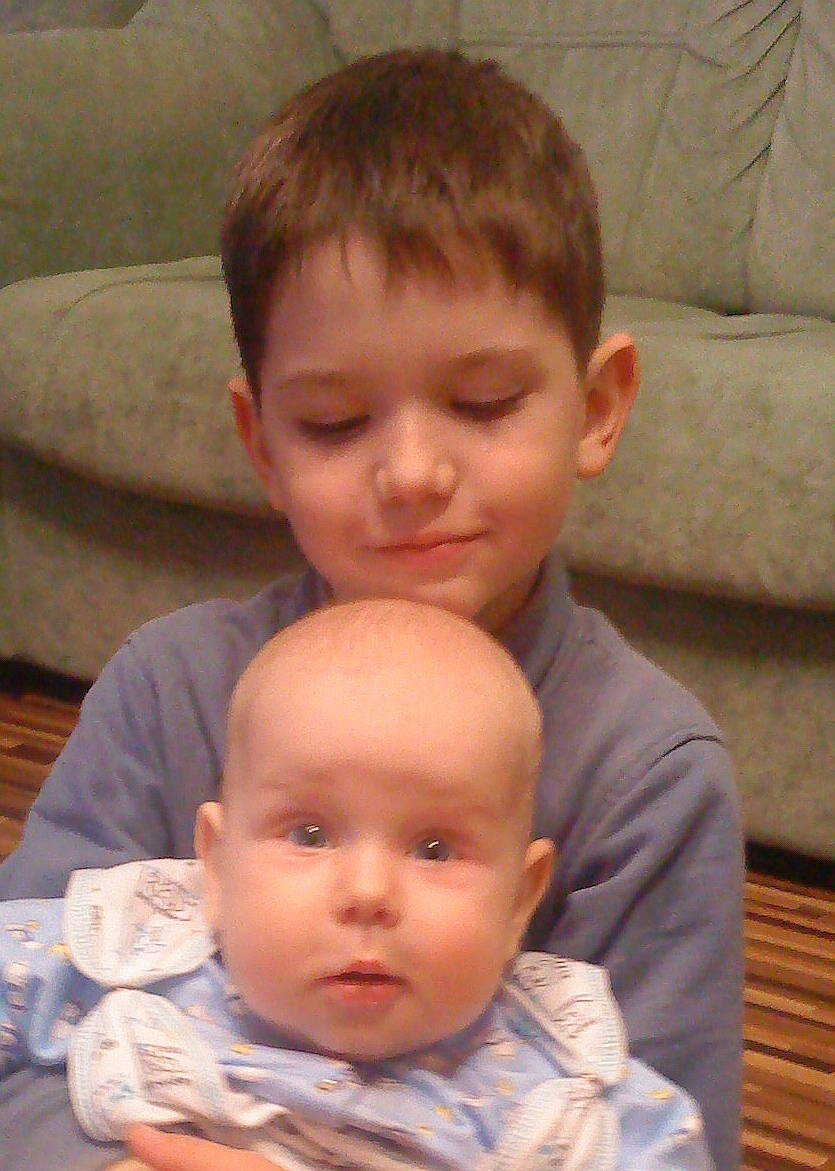
The buccal fat pads are clearly visible on the cheeks of children of different age, complexion and constitution.

== Function ==
Some people describe the buccal fat pad’s primary function in relation to chewing and suckling, especially in infants. This theory derives some support from the loss of volume to the intermediate lobe, which would be most directly involved in chewing and sucking, from infancy to adulthood.

Another proposed function is as gliding pads that facilitate the action of the muscles of mastication.

The buccal fat pad may also function as a cushion to protect sensitive facial muscles from injury due to muscle action or exterior force.

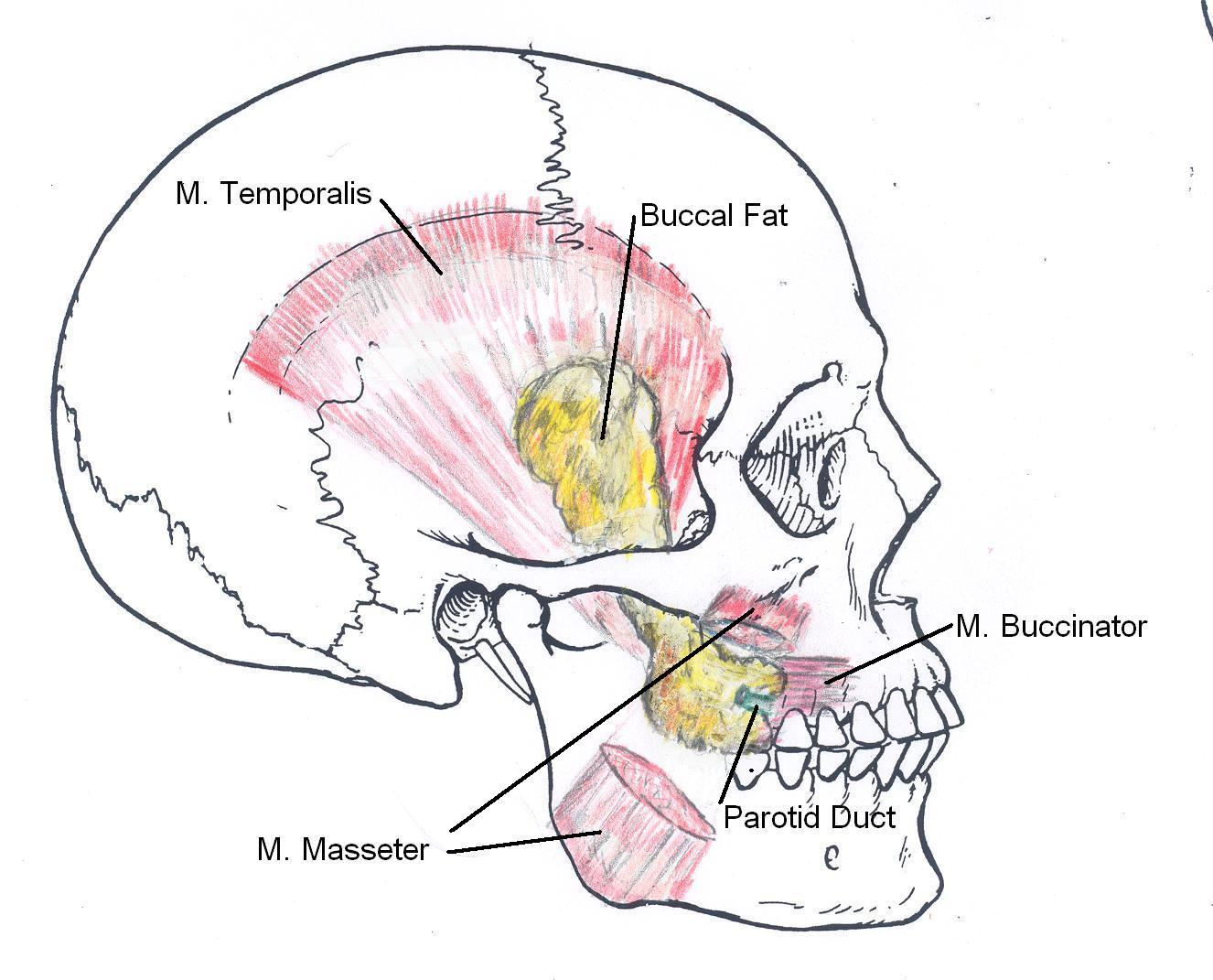

== Clinical uses ==
The buccal fat pad is commonly used in facial recontouring. Several authors discuss the importance of the buccal fat pad in attaining good results from a facelift.

Buccal flaps (not always including the buccal fat pad) are used in reconstruction of the periorbital area after injury. They are also used to repair congenital defects of the oral cavity or for repair of congenital cleft palate.

Removal of the buccal fat pad is also sometimes used to reduce cheek prominence, although this procedure may carry with it a significant risk of damage to the buccal branch of the facial nerve and the parotid ducts.
