= Israel Defense Forces thirst-trap propaganda =

Israel Defense Forces thirst-trap propaganda is social media content, mainly on TikTok and Instagram, in which attractive Israel Defense Forces (IDF) personnel, predominantly young women, dance, lip-sync, or pose with weapons in sexualized or flirtatious ways. The content appears on soldiers' personal accounts, on the IDF's official accounts, and on unofficial fan pages that compile it for wider audiences. It functions as a form of informal public diplomacy by presenting the military through youthful, relatable, and sexually appealing imagery, and it humanizes soldiers and builds international sympathy for Israel, particularly among young men. While the IDF previously discouraged dancing videos, this policy was relaxed in 2021.

The term comes from "thirst trap," internet slang for a photo or video posted to attract sexual attention. Coverage of IDF-linked material under this label began by 2016, intensified during the May 2021 Gaza conflict, and surged after the war that followed the 7 October attacks, when a semi-automated network also repurposed soldiers' footage to solicit engagement from male viewers.

== Background ==
Sexualized public-relations imagery involving Israeli soldiers predates social media. In 2007, the Israeli consulate in New York helped arrange for former female IDF soldiers to appear in bikinis on the cover of Maxim magazine, after research commissioned by the consulate suggested that Israel had little resonance with men aged 18 to 38. The spread drew criticism from Israeli feminist politicians, who called it degrading.

Academic work on the IDF's official social media use has generally treated it as one strand of a broader public-diplomacy strategy rather than as a phenomenon defined by sexualization. A 2017 study by Ayelet Kohn in the journal Convergence: The International Journal of Research into New Media Technologies analyzed photographs on the IDF's official Instagram account and argued that the account borrowed Instagram's existing visual and emotional conventions (casual self-portraiture, admiration of landscape, fascination with equipment) to build solidarity with the military among ordinary users, without needing to look like conventional propaganda. Also, Adi Kuntsman and Rebecca L. Stein's 2015 book Digital Militarism: Israel's Occupation in the Social Media Age described Israeli soldiers informal social media habits, including selfies posted with weapons, as part of what the authors termed "digital militarism": a blending of ordinary networked culture with the everyday conduct of military occupation.

Before the "thirst trap" reporting took hold, similar content periodically attracted IDF disciplinary action. In 2013, 2014, the military disciplined groups of female recruits after photographs and videos surfaced showing them in underwear, helmets, or little else, alongside military equipment, on bases in southern Israel; the IDF described the conduct as "unbecoming behavior". Earlier incidents, including a 2010 video of a male soldier dancing near a blindfolded Palestinian detainee, had already prompted the military to restrict soldiers on-base social media use, though enforcement was inconsistent.

== Timeline ==
=== 2016–2021 ===
By 2016, an Instagram account compiling images of attractive female soldiers, then inactive, had drawn brief commentary in The Forward, which described the material as belonging to an "IDF hotties" genre and speculated it might function as pro-Israel, pro-military distraction, though it treated the subject mainly as an offhand cultural curiosity rather than an investigated news story.

The term "thirst trap" was applied more directly to IDF-linked content during the May 2021 Gaza crisis. The Jerusalem Post published a critique that said its own review of the military's official social media accounts had not turned up this type of content.

=== Post October 2023 surge ===
Coverage and academic study thirst trap use sharply increased after the 7 October 2023 attacks attacks and the ensuing Gaza war that followed.

Writing in Dazed in October 2023, journalist Gunseli Yalinkaya described the IDF as openly leaning on its young, conventionally attractive conscripts, using what she called "nationalist thirst traps" to promote pro-Israel sentiment, and pointed to the IDF's own TikTok account (then with a following of over 250,000 people) alongside unofficial fan pages such as "Girls Defense" and "hot_idf_girls" and the influencer Natalia Fadeev, who by then also used the persona "Gun Waifu". The article put this material within the Israeli governments wider use of informal, meme-driven social media messaging during the war.

In a 2026 study, "Dancing in uniform: Thirst trap propaganda in military image wars on TikTok", by Marcus Bösch and Tom Divon, the authors found 200 TikTok accounts run by individual female IDF soldiers and analyzed 500 videos posted between October 2023 and October 2024, comprising what they called "a highly effective form of memetic soft propaganda", and classifying the content into three categories:

- "low thirst: playful authority cuteness": videos using non-military aesthetics,
- "mild thirst: weaponry as a prop": videos that incorporate weapons and military settings into ordinary platform dance trends,
- "high thirst: military self-sexualization and war porn": videos involving what the authors term military self-sexualization, including close-up and suggestive images.

The authors describe the resulting genre as "participatory militainment": informal content that humanizes soldiers, blurs the line between personal branding and official messaging, and, in their reading, trivializes violence while distracting from the war's civilian toll.

The study also documented another separate, semi-automated network of accounts, some with links registered in Russia, that repurposed authentic footage of IDF soldiers, mainly Yael Deri, under invented aliases and "contact me" captions to solicit engagement from male viewers. The researchers described this as a form of computational propaganda that achieved comparable engagement to organic content while requiring far less original material. However, the paper explicitly states that it does not treat individual soldiers as responsible for the trend, arguing that the videos instead sit within a broader "platformized and institutional ecology" that the authors say incentivizes such content without necessarily directing it centrally. The study also notes that the IDF, having disciplined soldiers for posting dance videos as recently as 2010, has since come to tolerate and in some cases encourage similar activity on personal accounts.

== See also ==
- 72 Virgins - Uncensored – debunked IDF telegram channel
- 72 virgins trope – Islamophobic trope
