= Buccal fat extraction =

Cosmetic plastic surgery procedure on the cheeks

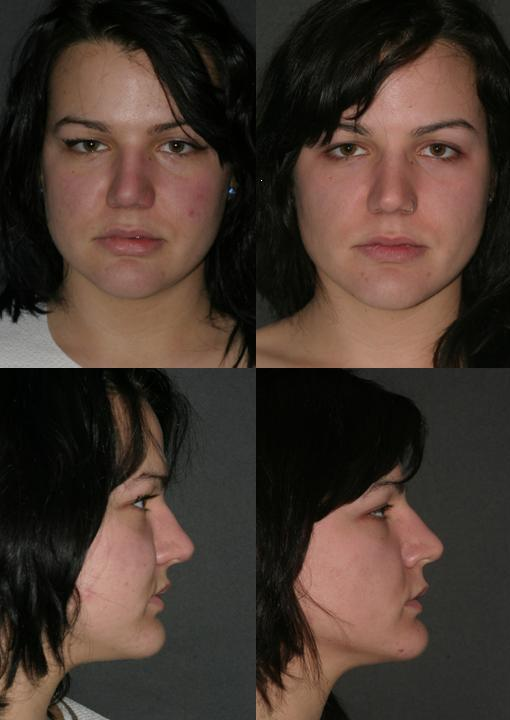
Cheek reduction: Bilateral extraction of buccal fat, assisted with lipoinjection to the bilateral malar eminences.

Buccal fat pad extraction or buccal fat removal is a plastic surgery procedure that removes a piece of buccal fat-pad tissue from each side of the face. This reduces the appearance of cheek puffiness, creating a sharper jawline. The amount of fat removed varies based on the desired facial shape. It is a strictly cosmetic surgery.

== History ==
The buccal fat pad was first described by Lorenz Heister in 1732 as a glandular tissue. In 1802, Xavier Bichat correctly defined the structure as fat tissue and popularized awareness of it.

In 2021, Chrissy Teigen revealed that she had undergone buccal fat removal. The following year, The New York Times reported that the procedure was gaining popularity due to discussion on Twitter and TikTok, and quoted a plastic surgeon who called it "one of the classic celebrity secret plastic surgeries". Speculation about celebrity buccal fat removal became a popular subject online, with people such as Bella Hadid, Lea Michele and Khloe Kardashian guessed to have undergone it.

The American Society of Plastic Surgeons did not collect statistics on buccal fat removal until 2022. That year, they recorded 4,543 such procedures performed by their surgeons, making it the least popular facial technique that they recorded statistics for.

== Surgical procedure ==
=== Cost ===
Buccal fat removal is a cosmetic procedure with no medical benefit, and thus rarely covered by insurance. It is typically performed by plastic surgeons.

According to RealSelf, the average cost in 2023 was $4,097, but could go as low as $1,000. Interviewed by The New York Times in 2022, one plastic surgeon stated he charged $40,000 for the procedure, while others said they typically charged between $7,000 and $16,000. The Times also described a medical tourist who got the procedure for $600 in Tijuana 2020.

=== Associated procedures ===
Buccal fat removal is often performed as a solo procedure but can be done alongside a facelift, chin implant, neck lift or any other surgery attempting to add definition to the face. It is also often done in combination with chin liposuction and fat grafting.

=== Technique ===
The reduction of buccal fat pad is usually performed under local anesthesia with the patient completely awake. The typical approach for removing the buccal fat pad is through an incision in the mouth, towards the back of the oral cavity, near the second upper molar. The buccinator muscle is then encountered and without making an incision, the fibers are separated until the buccal fat is seen. Once the buccal fat is visualized, a thin casing over the fat is opened and the fat is gently teased out while gentle pressure is applied externally. The fat is then cauterized at the base and removed. The remainder of the buccal fat pad then is replaced to its anatomic site and the oral mucosa is sutured close, and the two incisions are sutured. The procedure typically takes about 30 minutes.

=== Recovery ===
Patients typically have swelling for a few days, but often this swelling is not visible externally. Typically, self absorbing sutures that dissolve on their own are used. The final results can take up to 3 months to manifest.

=== Risks ===
Injury to the buccal branch of the facial nerve is a risk. The buccal branch nerves that might be affected control facial functions, therefore, such damage might result in partial facial paralysis, regional facial numbness, loss of taste, et cetera. Likewise, damage to the parotid duct also might occur in men and women whose parotid ducts run deep to the buccal fat pad, which can lead to a salivary fistula or buildup of saliva.

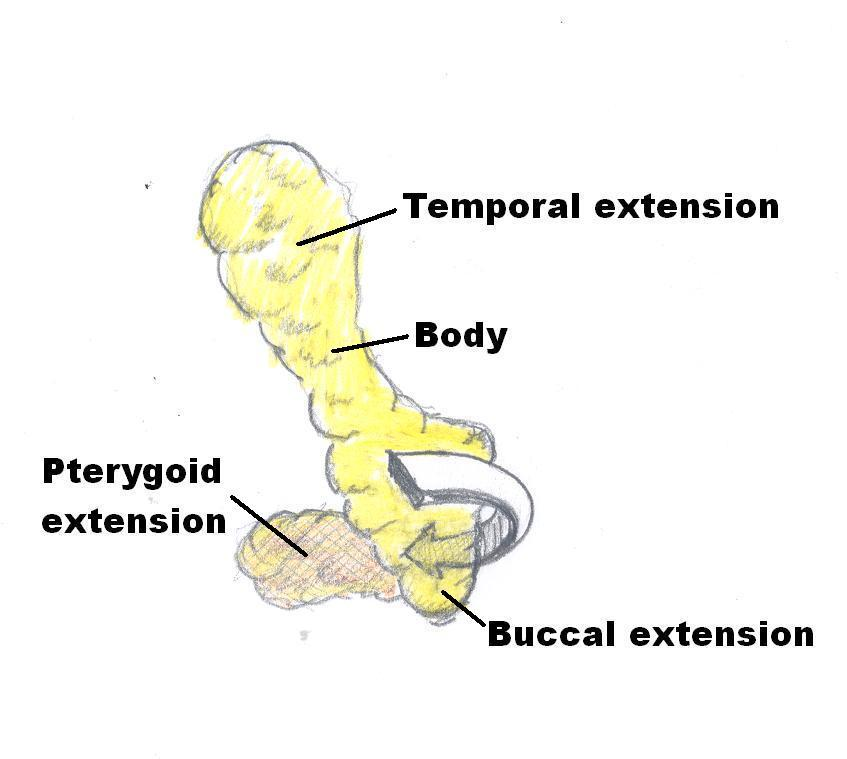
Cheek reduction: Anatomic illustration of the fat pads of the mouth (buccal fat pads).

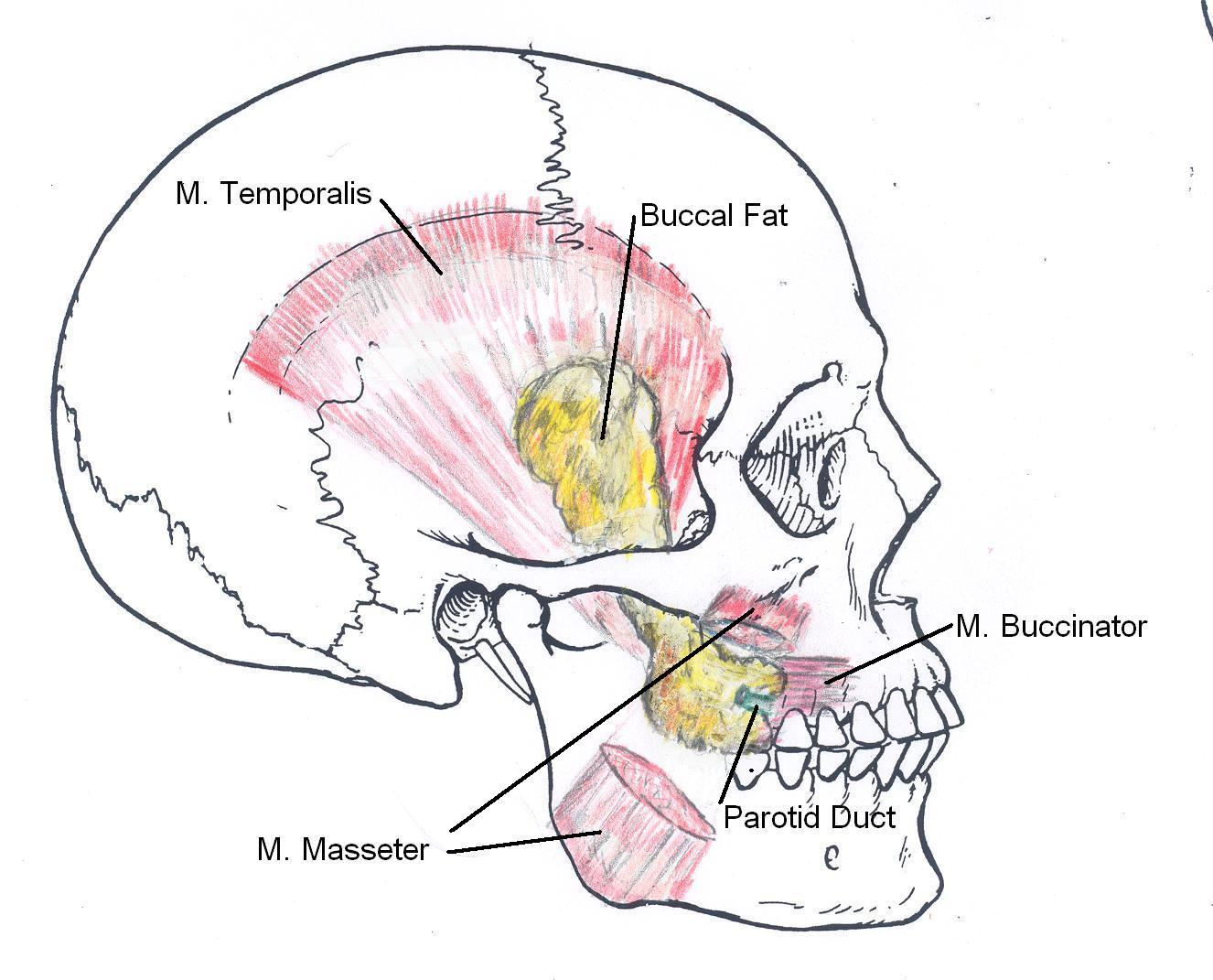
Buccal fat-pad reduction: The anatomic locale of the buccal fat pads in the human face.

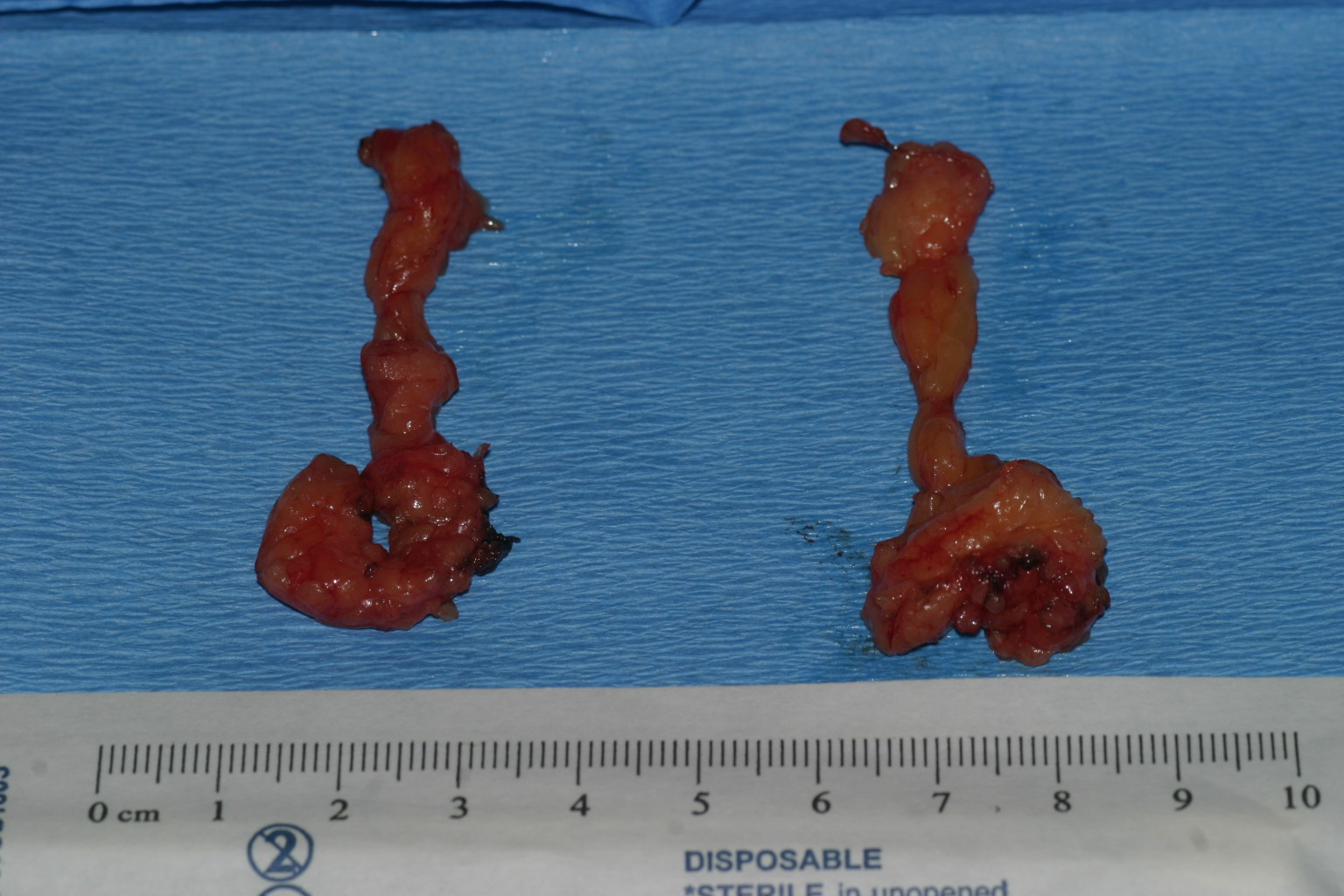
Cheek reduction: The buccal fat pads extracted from a patient who underwent bilateral cheek reduction

== Long term effects ==
Buccal fat removal is permanent; the fat pads do not grow back. However, new techniques for restoring buccal fat such as injecting fat intra-orally back into the buccal space or applying a dermal fat graft are gaining popularity. Other options include mimicry with injectable fillers. There is a lack of research on its long-term health effects.

In an aesthetic sense, buccal fat removal may cause an excessively gaunt appearance when the cheeks naturally lose more volume with age.

== In popular culture ==
The surgery and discussion of it became a trend in the early 2020s, gaining the colloquial nickname "Handsome Squidward surgery", referencing an exaggeratedly chiseled face from the SpongeBob SquarePants episode "The Two Faces of Squidward".
