= Plastic and Reconstructive Surgery =

- Discipline: Plastic surgery
- Language: English
- Edited by: Kevin C. Chung

Publication details
- Former names: Plastic and Reconstructive Surgery and the Transplantation Bulletin (1946-1963 ISSN 0096-8501), Plastic and Reconstructive Surgery (1946-1958 ISSN 1075-1270)
- History: 1946-present
- Publisher: Lippincott Williams & Wilkins (United States)
- Frequency: Monthly
- Impact factor: 4.73 (2020)

Standard abbreviations
- ISO 4: Plast. Reconstr. Surg.

Indexing
- CODEN: PRSUAS
- ISSN: 0032-1052 (print); 1529-4242 (web)

Links
- Journal homepage

Plastic and Reconstructive Surgery is a peer-reviewed medical journal and the official publication of the American Society of Plastic Surgeons. It covers all aspects of plastic and reconstructive surgery, including operative procedures, clinical or laboratory research, and case reports.
