= Julie Gao =

Chinese lawyer and business executive

- Born: 1971 (age 54–55); Shanghai, China
- Education: Peking University (LLB); University of Alabama (MA); University of California Los Angeles (JD)
- Occupations: lawyer; business executive
- Organization: CFO of ByteDance

Z. Julie Gao is a Chinese attorney and business executive who has served as the Chief Financial Officer of ByteDance, the parent company of TikTok, Douyin, CapCut, Toutiao, and many other major brands, since 2022. She previously served as a partner at Skadden, Arps, Slate, Meagher & Flom, where she specialized in IPOs. She was ranked as #47 on the Forbes list of the World's 100 Most Powerful Women in 2025 and #57 on the Fortune Most Powerful Women in Business in 2026.

== Biography ==
She was born and raised in Shanghai, and attended the Peking University for her Bachelors of Law. During her study, she was a reporter at the school newspaper and practiced Chinese calligraphy. She then studied sociology at the University of Alabama, where she earned a Masters degree. She worked as a legal assistant at the Asian Pacific American Legal Center in Southern California, before, after receiving encouragement from her attorney supervisors, applying to law school and attending the University of California, Los Angeles for her JD, which she earned in 1998. She then spent six years as an associate at Latham & Watkins, before moving to Hong Kong in 2004. She was then tapped by Skadden, Arps, Slate, Meagher & Flom to be a partner in 2009.

She rapidly became known as an influential lawyer for IPOs: clients that she supported the IPOs of included Xiaomi, Meituan, Baidu, and JD.com, and one company even wrote into their contract with Skadden that she needed to be the one working on their IPO. She was described as "iconic" and as one of the most effective lawyers anywhere in China. Among other companies, she had been involved with supporting ByteDance starting in 2016.

In 2022, she was tapped for the position of CFO of ByteDance, succeeding Shou Zi Chew, who was moved to being CEO of ByteDance subsidiary TikTok. Her appointment was seen as an effort to prepare the company for a potential IPO.

She was ranked #47 on the Forbes 100 Most Powerful Women in 2025 and #81 on the Fortune Most Powerful Women In Business in 2025. She was ranked #57 on the Fortune Most Powerful Women In Business in 2026.

She has claimed to have never been out of reach of her laptop and Blackberry for longer than 24 hours, even during maternity leave.
