= Wei-Ying Ma =

Tsingua University professor and former VP of ByteDance

- 马维英
- Education: National Tsing Hua University (BS); University of California Santa Barbara (MS, PhD)
- Occupation: Chief Scientist - Institute for AI Industry Research (AIR)
- Employer: Tsinghua University
- Honours: ACM Fellow, Wu Wenjun Artificial Intelligence Science and Technology Award

Wei-Ying Ma is a Taiwanese computer scientist. He has authored over 300 papers and obtained 169 patents as of January 2024. He has served on the editorial boards of the ACM Transactions on Information Systems (TOIS) and the ACM/Springer Multimedia Systems Journal. He also served as a program co-chair of the International Conference on World Wide Web (WWW) 2008, a program co-chair of the Pacific Rim Conference on Multimedia (PCM) '07, and the general co-chair of the Asia Information Retrieval Symposium (AIRS) '08.

He was the general co-chair of ACM Special Interest Group on Information Retrieval (SIGIR) 2011 and also a member of the International World Wide Web Conferences Steering Committee from 2010 through 2016. As Vice President and head of the AI lab at ByteDance, he led the development of AI-powered technologies integrated into platforms like Douyin, TikTok, and Jinri Toutiao, which impacted digital content creation and distribution. Ma currently holds the position of Huiyan Chair Professor at Tsinghua University and serves as the Chief Scientist at the Institute for AI Industry Research (AIR), a program he established alongside Ya-Qin Zhang in 2020.

== Education ==
Ma obtained a Bachelor of Science in electrical engineering from National Tsing Hua University in Taiwan in 1990. He continued his studies at the University of California, Santa Barbara, earning a Master of Science in 1994, and a Ph.D in electrical and computer engineering in 1997. During his doctoral studies, Ma was involved in the Alexandria Digital Library project, focusing on the development of innovative image retrieval systems and segmentation solutions.

== Career ==
Ma began his professional career at Hewlett-Packard Labs in Palo Alto, California, where he focused on multimedia content analysis and adaptation. Ma joined Microsoft Research Asia (MSRA) in 2001 and took the position of Assistant Managing Director. In this role, he supervised research groups that took part in the development of technologies for Microsoft's Bing Search Engine and Microsoft Advertising. He developed techniques for web page analysis by utilizing visual cues to extract structured data. This work led to the creation of Microsoft Academic Search, a search engine that offers automatic entity summaries and improved user navigation. Additionally, he led projects such as the Microsoft Graph Engine, facilitating knowledge graph processing for web search and natural language understanding, and the creation of the Microsoft Concept Graph, a comprehensive repository of concepts and facts derived from extensive web and search data. Furthermore, he led developing the Distributed Machine Learning Toolkit, which aimed to improve the efficiency and scalability of machine learning tasks involving large datasets.

Ma joined ByteDance in 2016, assuming the position of Vice President and Head of the AI Lab in 2017. During his time at ByteDance, Ma established the ByteDance AI Lab to focus on research and technology development in machine learning, computer vision, and natural language processing. Ma contributed to the development of AI-powered content creation and dissemination technologies integrated into ByteDance's products, including Douyin, TikTok, Jinri Toutiao, CapCut, and Lark. The number of AI researchers increased from five in 2016, to 150 by the end of 2018. He and his team worked on the development of machine learning models for content analysis, video analysis systems, and innovative techniques for music generation, recommendation, speech recognition, and content creation.

Ma left ByteDance in 2020. His departure coincided with regulatory challenges faced by TikTok worldwide. The app was banned in India in June of that year. There was also a possible ban by the US Government due to security concerns and suspicions that Beijing could force the owner, who is of Chinese descent, to turn over user data.

Upon Leaving Bytedance, Ma transitioned to AI Industry Research (AIR), a research institute under Tsinghua University in Beijing. This initiative, led by scientist and entrepreneur Dr. Ya-Qin Zhang, established a center dedicated to scientific research and technological innovation focusing on areas such as autonomous driving, AI+IoT, and neuromorphic computing.

Additionally, Ma co-founded Helixon, a startup aimed at advancing next-generation AI for antibody design and protein therapeutics discovery. He also served as Director of the Health Computing Research Center at the Beijing Academy of Artificial Intelligence (BAAI) from 2021 to 2023 advancing AI applications in healthcare.

As of 2024, Ma is leading AI initiatives for scientific applications as Chief Scientist, with a specific emphasis on AI-driven drug discovery and generative AI for biology and chemistry.

== Awards ==
Ma has been recognized with several awards throughout his career. In 2009, he received the Management Excellence Trailblazer Award at Microsoft for his contributions within the organization. In 2010, he was honored as a Distinguished Alumni of the school of EECS at Tsinghua University. His contributions to the field were further acknowledged when he became an ACM Distinguished Member in 2010. In 2023, Ma was recognized as an ACM Fellow in the US for his leadership and significant contributions to web search and data mining. Additionally, for his work at ByteDance, Ma received the Wu Wenjun Artificial Intelligence Science and Technology Award.
