= Dazhongsi =

Dazhongsi may refer to:

- Dazhongsi Square, also known as Dazhongsi Plaza, 1733 Shopping Mall or 1733 Commercial Space, the shopping mall (floors 1, B1, B2) and headquarters (floors 2 and above) of ByteDance, in Haidian, Beijing, China
- Dazhong Si station, metro station in Haidian, Beijing, China, on Lines 12 and 13, Beijing Subway
- Great Bell Temple (Big Bell Temple), or Dazhongsi in Pinyin, fully known as Dazhongsi (Big Bell Temple) Ancient Bell Museum
