= Kelly Zhang =

Chinese businesswoman

- Occupation: Business executive
- Title: CEO of ByteDance China

Kelly Zhang (Chinese: 张楠; pinyin: Zhāng Nán) is a Chinese businesswoman. She is the chief executive officer of ByteDance China. She is responsible for overseeing the operations and management of the company's China portfolio, including the video-sharing platform Douyin and the news aggregator Toutiao.

Zhang was ranked 64th on Fortune's list of Most Powerful Women in 2023. She was named in the Forbes list of The World's 100 Most Powerful Women in 2020, and in the Fortune's Most Powerful Women International list in 2020 and 2021.

== Early life and career ==
Zhang studied painting as a child and completed her university studies in 2003 with a degree in fine arts. After graduating, Zhang's first position was working on product planning and design for three years in Beijing at Digital Red, a mobile game studio.

In 2006, Zhang left Digital Red and began working at Qianchi Unlimited, a social media app developer.

In February 2013, Zhang founded a photo-sharing app called Tuba, which accumulated nearly 500,000 users in its first six months.

== ByteDance ==
Tuba was acquired by ByteDance in 2014, where Zhang had begun working as a product manager. Zhang was then put in charge of ByteDance's user-generated content business. She has been credited for the success of Douyin, which was launched in September 2016, and was named the CEO of Douyin in March, 2018. During Zhang's tenure as Douyin's CEO, she worked to build Douyin's presence in Chinese cities by developing partnerships with international luxury fashion and sports brands. Zhang was also responsible for other ByteDance brands such as Huoshan Video, photo editor Qingyan and video editor Jianying.

In March 2020, Zhang became CEO of ByteDance's China business. In January 2021, Zhang was responsible for the rollout of Douyin Pay, a built-in service to allow Douyin users to buy goods and services within the app.

== Awards and recognition ==
- 2020: #62, Forbes list of The World's 100 Most Powerful Women
- 2020: #45, Fortune Most Powerful Women International
- 2021: #48, Fortune Most Powerful Women International
- 2021: #11, Forbes China 100 Top Businesswomen List
