= Health News (China) =

Chinese newspaper

Health News (健康报)
- Type: Daily (5 issues per week)
- Format: Major newspaper
- Owner: National Health Commission of the People's Republic of China
- Publisher: Health News Press
- Founded: 1931, Ruijin, Jiangxi
- Language: Simplified Chinese
- Headquarters: No. 6, East Zhimen Outer Street, Beijing
- Price: RMB0.8
- Website: http://www.jkb.com.cn/

Health News (simplified Chinese: 健康报; traditional Chinese: 健康報; pinyin: Jiànkāng Bào) is the official newspaper of the National Health Commission of the People's Republic of China. Founded in 1931, Health News is regarded as the earliest professional health newspaper in China. In January 1956, Premier Zhou Enlai personally inscribed the masthead of the newspaper. Health News is now one of China's most authoritative and influential medical publications. Its mission is to publicize national health policies, report medical and scientific developments, and promote public health knowledge.

== History ==
In 1931, Health (Chinese: 健康) was founded as a revolutionary health newspaper in Ruijin, Jiangxi by He Cheng, head of the Central Soviet Area's medical corps.

1934–1936: The newspaper publication continued during the Long March despite difficult conditions. After arriving in northern Shaanxi with the Red Army in 1936, Health ceased publication.

After the victory of the War of Resistance Against Japan, Health resumed publication in Jiamusi on August 15, 1946.

In 1949, the editorial office was relocated to Beijing, becoming the official newspaper of the Ministry of Health of the Central People's Government.

In 1956, Health was renamed Health News, and Premier Zhou Enlai inscribed the Chinese new name "健康报" for it. In the same year, the newspaper converted from vertical to horizontal typesetting.

From 1966 to 1979, Health News was suspended due to the Cultural Revolution.

In September 1988, Health News published a reader's letter urging Deng Xiaoping, then Chairman of the Central Military Commission, to quit smoking. A few days later, the article was reprinted by a BBC reporter.

In November 1999, the Health News website was launched after obtaining an Internet news information service license by the government.

In 2007, the digital version of Health News was launched.

In 2009, Health News was selected by the China World Records Association as one of the earliest health-related professional newspapers in China.

In 2013, 2015, and 2017, Health News was ranked among the top 100 newspapers and periodicals in China for three consecutive times.

By 2018, Health News had established a government new media matrix covering dozens of platforms including WeChat, Weibo, Toutiao, Douyin, Tencent, and Baidu.

In February 2019, the Health News press changed its name from "Health News" to "Health News Co., Ltd.", as the official new media platform of the National Health Commission.

In 2024, the "Healthy China" government new media platform hosted by Health News had a total of over 24 million followers and over 100 billion views.

== Content and sections ==
Health News is published five times a week, Monday through Friday. There are eight pages in a broadsheet format. The page layout are

- News pages: covering national health policies, medical research, and public health issues.
- Special editions: including Management Weekly, Primary Health Care, Humanities Perspective, People & Vision, Culture Window, Medical Horizons, Knowledge and Health.
- Columns: including hospital management forums, nursing features, medical insurance reports, public health online, traditional Chinese medicine, elderly health.

== Influence ==
For many years, Health News has ranked among the top 50 newspapers and magazines in the national postal system in terms of circulation. It is considered an authoritative and professional newspaper in China's health sector. It organizes major events such as the National Public Hospital Development Summit, the Internet + Health China Conference, and the National Health Microfilm Festival. Its stated mission is "to serve the people's health and promote a civilized and scientific lifestyle."

== See also ==
- National Health Commission of China
