= Latham & Watkins =

American law firm

Latham & Watkins LLP
- No. of offices: 31, largest office in Manhattan
- No. of attorneys: 3,500+
- Major practice areas: General corporate, mergers & acquisitions, banking and finance, litigation, antitrust
- Key people: Richard Trobman (chair)
- Revenue: ▲$8.3 billion (2025)
- Profit per equity partner: ▲$8.65 million (2025)
- Date founded: February 8, 1934; 92 years ago
- Founder: Dana Latham, Paul Watkins
- Company type: Limited liability partnership
- Website: lw.com

Latham & Watkins LLP (Note: Latham is pronounced LAY-thum.) is an American white-shoe, multinational law firm. Founded in 1934 in Los Angeles, it has more than 3,500 lawyers in 31 offices across 14 countries as of 2026. It is the second-highest-grossing law firm in the world by revenue and reported an average profits per equity partner of $8.65 million in 2025.

== History ==
=== 20th Century ===
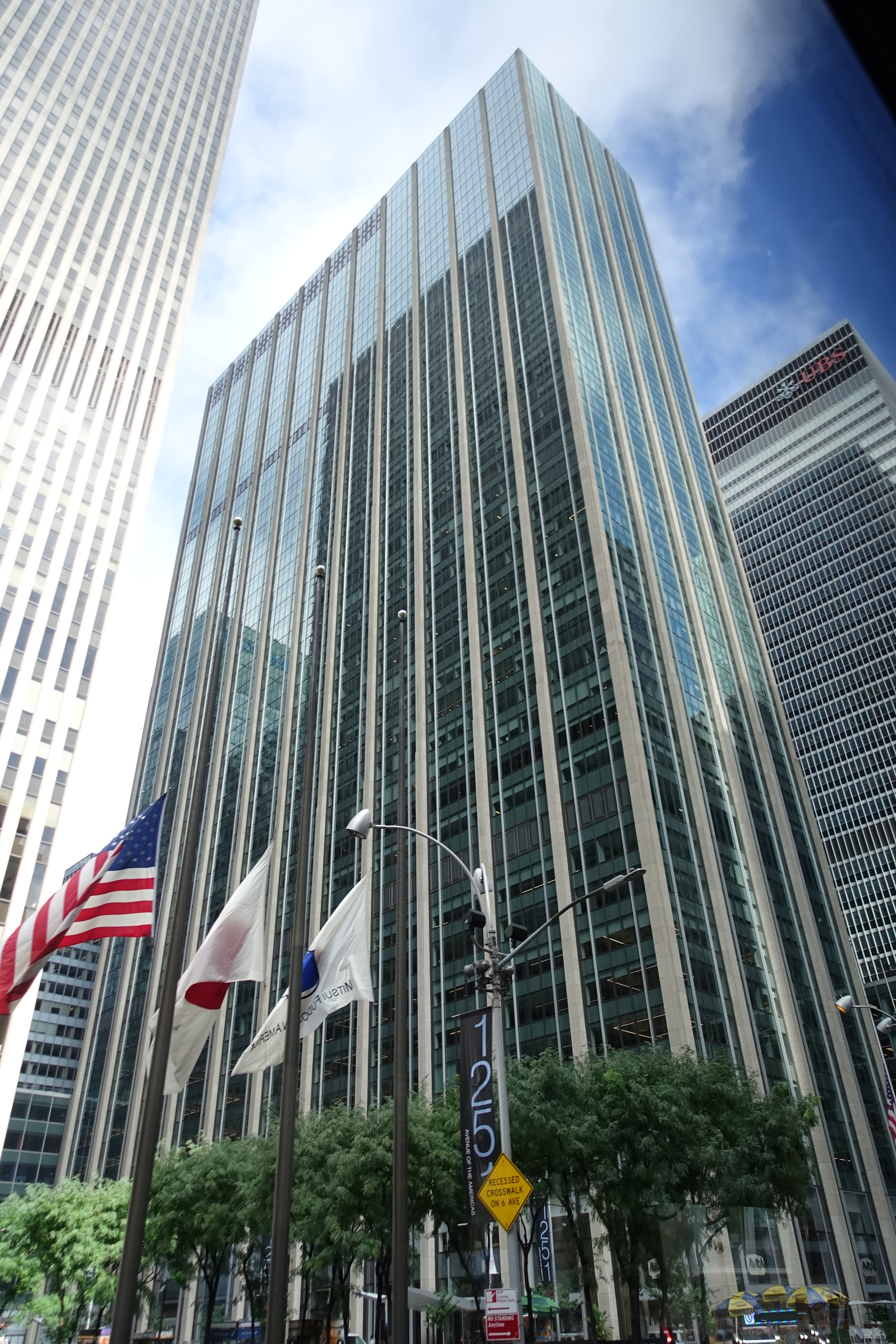
Latham's New York City office is located at 1271 Avenue of the Americas

The firm was founded in January 1934 in Los Angeles, California, by Dana Latham and Paul Watkins. Latham's practice focused on state and federal tax law, and he eventually served as Commissioner of the U.S. Internal Revenue Service under President Dwight Eisenhower. Watkins's practice focused primarily on labor. At first, the firm grew slowly, with only 19 attorneys employed as of 1960.

In February 1978, the firm expanded into Washington, D.C., by adding Carla Anderson Hills as a named partner. Hills had left her role as U.S. Secretary of Housing and Urban Development in the Ford administration the prior year, and she oversaw the firm's expansion into administrative law. This branch was initially staffed with a mix of attorneys drawn from the Los Angeles office and new hires from the upper ranks of federal agencies.

In the latter half of the twentieth century, particularly during the 20-year tenure of chair Robert Dell, Latham quickly expanded its national and international presence. The firm opened offices in San Diego (1980), Chicago (1982), New York City (1985), San Francisco (1990), London (1990), Moscow (1992), Hong Kong (1995), Tokyo (1995), Silicon Valley (1997), and Singapore (1997).

=== 21st Century ===
In 2007, Latham became the first American law firm to attain more than $2 billion in yearly revenue.

Amid the global recession in 2009, the firm laid off 190 lawyers and 250 paralegal and support staff, representing twelve percent of the firm's total associates and ten percent of the support staff. At a time when many firms were conducting layoffs, the term "Lathamed" became slang for being laid off, in legal circles.

In 2018, Latham was the first law firm to report more than $3 billion in gross revenue. It was briefly the highest-grossing law firm in the world, but has since lost the number one spot to Kirkland & Ellis. In March 2018, firm chair William Voge, elected in 2014, resigned from the firm.

In August 2023, Latham announced the decision to close its Shanghai office amid consolidation of its operations in China.

Amid clashes at some college campuses, following the onset of the 2023 Israel-Hamas war, Latham & Watkins was among a group of law firms who sent a letter to 14 American law school deans denouncing anti-Semitism, Islamophobia, and racism.

During the targeting of law firms and lawyers under the second Trump administration, in April 2025, the firm agreed to a deal with Donald Trump, committing to provide $125 million of pro bono legal work on behalf of causes endorsed by Trump. As a result of the settlement, companies, including Morgan Stanley and Microsoft, moved their legal work to other firms that had not settled with the administration. In July 2026, the Department of Justice subpoenaed Latham & Watkins in an investigation of the deal.

In April 2026, USA v. Fejal, et al revealed that a former law associate, who had been fired by Latham in 2021, was indicted, with 29 others, for insider trading in January 2026, after leading a scheme orchestrated over decades by a network that included some of his former Yale classmates. Involved law firms were characterized as victims by prosecutors.

In 2026, the firm represents terminal operator IFG Port Holdings in its appeal, after the United States Court of Appeals for the Fifth Circuit vacated a 2019 $124.5 million award to IFG, due to undisclosed long-term social ties between Magistrate Judge Kathleen Kay, since retired, and IFG's trial lawyer, William Monk.

Latham represented CoreCivic, a private prison company, in Nikki Grae v. Corrections Corporation of America, a securities class action lawsuit brought by its shareholders. The lawsuit alleged that CoreCivic misrepresented conditions at its facilities and the health of its relationship with the federal Bureau of Prisons, a major CoreCivic client, despite government officials' warnings that they would phase out private prisons. CoreCivic is one of the largest for-profit prison, jail and detention contractors in the United States. It has been the target of divestment campaigns, FBI investigations and lawsuits alleging civil rights violations and forced labor at some of its owned or operated state and federal correctional and detention facilities in the U.S., which include ICE detention centers.

== Recognition ==
Latham has been consistently ranked as the second-largest law firm in the world by revenue among the Am Law 100, since 2021, and was the No. 1 firm in the Am Law 100 rankings for 2017. In 2022, Latham was also one of the most profitable law firms in the world, with profits per partner exceeding US$7.1 million.

In 2024, the firm received its tenth consecutive ranking from Chambers and Partners, which is the highest number of consecutive practice and lawyer rankings. Latham ranked #4 among the Vault Law 100 in 2024.

In March 2025, Latham & Watkins was named 2024 Americas Law Firm of the Year.

== Notable attorneys and alumni ==
=== Judiciary ===
- Cormac J. Carney - District Judge, United States District Court for the Central District of California
- Michael Chertoff – Former Circuit Judge, United States Court of Appeals for the Third Circuit and Former U.S. Secretary of Homeland Security
- Kenneth Conboy – District Judge, United States District Court for the Southern District of New York
- Gary Feinerman – District Judge, United States District Court for the Northern District of Illinois
- Patricia Guerrero – Chief Justice of California Supreme Court
- Robert S. Huie – District Judge, United States District Court for the Southern District of California
- Jonathan Lippman – Chief Judge of the New York Court of Appeals
- Amit Mehta – District Judge, United States District Court for the District of Columbia

=== Government ===
- Carla Anderson Hills – United States Trade Representative, United States Secretary of Housing and Urban Development, United States Assistant Attorney General for the Civil Division
- Bruce Babbitt – Former United States Secretary of the Interior
- Nanette Barragán – U.S. representative for California's 44th congressional district
- Sean M. Berkowitz – Federal prosecutor in the trials of Enron executives Ken Lay and Jeffrey Skilling. Also defended Lori Loughlin in the 2019 college admissions bribery scandal.
- Leslie R. Caldwell – Assistant Attorney General for the Criminal Division of the United States Department of Justice from 2014 to 2017.
- Charles Courtenay, 19th Earl of Devon
- Christopher Cox – Former Chairman of the Securities and Exchange Commission
- Richard Danzig – Former United States Secretary of the Navy
- Mark S. Fowler – Chairman of the Federal Communications Commission
- Gregory G. Garre – Former Solicitor General of the United States
- Fred Goldberg – Former Commissioner of Internal Revenue (IRS)
- Carla Hills – Former United States Trade Representative
- Roderick M. Hills – Former Chairman of the Securities and Exchange Commission
- Dana Latham – Firm Founder, Former Commissioner of the Internal Revenue Service
- Maureen Mahoney - Former Deputy Solicitor General of the United States
- Philip Perry – Former associate attorney general, former general counsel of the Office of Management and Budget, and former general counsel of Department of Homeland Security.
- J. Thomas Rosch – Former Commissioner of the Federal Communications Commission
- Kathryn Ruemmler – Former White House Counsel to President Barack Obama and federal prosecutor in the trials of Enron executives Ken Lay and Jeffrey Skilling.
- Ed Siskel – Former White House Counsel
- Rick Zbur – Member of the California State Assembly

=== Other ===
- Matthew Prince – chief executive officer of Cloudflare
- Julie Gao - Chief financial officer of ByteDance

== Supreme Court litigation ==
- A. J. T. v. Osseo Area Schools, on behalf of the family of a student with a disability. The Supreme Court unanimously sided with the family, holding that the "ADA and Rehabilitation Act claims based on educational services should be subject to the same standards that apply in other disability discrimination contexts."
- Andy Warhol Foundation for the Visual Arts, Inc. v. Goldsmith, on behalf of the Andy Warhol Foundation. The litigation resulted from Warhol's unauthorized use of Lynn Goldsmith's photograph of Prince in his own artwork. In a divided opinion, the Supreme Court sided with Goldsmith, concluding that Warhol could not rely on fair use because his work and the photograph "share substantially the same purpose, and the use is of a commercial nature."
- Oklahoma Statewide Charter School Board v. Drummond, on behalf of Oklahoma Attorney General Gentner Drummond. Drummond sued to prevent a religious school from operating as a public charter school. The Oklahoma Supreme Court sided with Drummond, holding that a religious charter school would violate the Establishment Clause. With Justice Amy Coney Barrett recused, the Supreme Court's ruling was 4-4, thereby allowing Oklahoma's ruling to stand.
- Relentless, Inc. v. Department of Commerce, on behalf of Relentless, Inc. The Supreme Court's landmark decision overruled the principle of Chevron deference established in Chevron U.S.A., Inc. v. Natural Resources Defense Council, Inc.
- Urias-Orellana v. Bondi, on behalf of Douglas Humberto Urias-Orellana, his wife Sayra Iliana Gamez-Mejia, and their minor child. Urias-Orellana sought asylum on the grounds that he was being targeted by a hitman in El Salvador. The Supreme Court rejected his appeal in a 9-0 ruling.
- Vega v. Tekoh, on behalf of Los Angeles County Sheriff's Department deputy Carlos Vega. In March 2014, Vega arrested Terence Tekoh, a hospital employee, on suspicion that he had sexually assaulted a patient. Tekoh then sued Vega under 42 U.S.C. § 1983, asserting he violated his rights under Miranda v. Arizona by not warning him of his right to remain silent. The Supreme Court sided with Vega, holding that an officer's failure to read Miranda warnings to a suspect in custody does not provide basis for a claim of civil liability.

== See also ==
- List of largest law firms by revenue
- List of largest law firms by profits per partner
