= Zhang Yiming =

Chinese internet entrepreneur (born 1983)

- 张一鸣
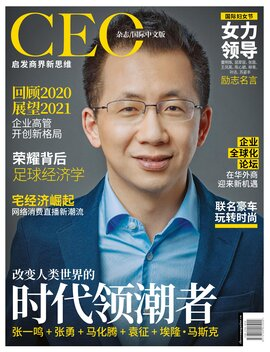
- Zhang in 2021
- Born: 1 April 1983 (age 43); Longyan Area, Fujian, China
- Education: Nankai University (BEng)
- Occupations: Internet entrepreneur; philanthropist
- Years active: 2006–present
- Known for: Founding and leading ByteDance, creating Douyin/TikTok
- Title: Founder & Chairman of ByteDance

Chinese name
- Simplified Chinese: 张一鸣
- Traditional Chinese: 張一鳴
Transcriptions
Standard Mandarin
- Hanyu Pinyin: Zhāng Yīmíng
- IPA: [ʈʂáŋ í.mǐŋ]
- Website: weibo.com/zhangyiming

Zhang Yiming (Chinese: 张一鸣; born 1 April 1983) is a Chinese Internet entrepreneur. He founded ByteDance in 2012, developed the news aggregator Toutiao and the video sharing platform Douyin (internationally known as TikTok). Zhang is one of the richest individuals in the world, with an estimated net worth of US$105 billion as of September 2026, according to Bloomberg. He is the first Chinese centibillionaire. On 4 November 2021, Zhang stepped down as CEO of ByteDance, completing a leadership handover announced in May 2021. According to Reuters, Zhang maintains over 50 percent of ByteDance's voting rights. The surging global popularity of TikTok made Zhang the richest man in China in 2024.

== Early life and career ==
Zhang was born on 1 April 1983, in Longyan, Fujian, China. His parents were civil servants and he was an only son. In 2001, he enrolled at Nankai University in Tianjin, where he majored in micro electronics engineering and software engineering. He graduated in 2005 with a BEng in computer engineering. He met his wife at university.

In February 2006, Zhang became the fifth employee and the first engineer at the travel website Kuxun. He was promoted to technical director a year later

In 2008, Zhang left Kuxun to work for Microsoft, but felt stifled by its corporate rules. He soon left Microsoft to join the startup Fanfou, which eventually failed. In 2009, when Expedia was about to acquire Kuxun, Zhang took over Kuxun's real estate search business and started 99fang.com, his first company. He quit the business three years later.

== ByteDance ==
Zhang thought that Chinese smartphone users were struggling to find information in mobile apps available in 2012, and the search giant Baidu was mixing search results with undisclosed advertising. His vision was to push relevant content to users using recommendations generated by artificial intelligence. This vision was not shared by most venture capitalists, and he failed to secure funding until Susquehanna International Group agreed to invest in the startup. In March 2012, he founded ByteDance with Liang Rubo in a four-bedroom apartment, and in August of the same year, ByteDance launched the Toutiao news app and within two years attracted more than 13 million daily users. Sequoia Capital, which initially rejected Zhang, came around and led a US$100 million investment in the company in 2014.

Zhang focused on expanding ByteDance globally, as opposed to other Chinese tech CEOs who focused on domestic growth of their companies. He insisted that ByteDance's workplace productivity app Lark be targeted at the American, European and Japanese markets, rather than limiting the focus to China as originally proposed. Zhang's management style with ByteDance was modeled on US tech companies such as Google and included bimonthly town hall meetings and discouraging employees from calling him "boss" or "CEO", as is the Chinese convention.

In September 2017, ByteDance launched its video-sharing app TikTok (known as Douyin in China) internationally. The product was an instant hit with millennials and became popular worldwide. A year later in August 2018, ByteDance bought Musical.ly for US$800 million and integrated it into TikTok.

In 2018, the National Radio and Television Administration shut down ByteDance's first app, Neihan Duanzi. In response, Zhang issued an apology, writing that the app was "incommensurate with socialist core values" and had a "weak" implementation of Xi Jinping Thought, and promised that ByteDance would "further deepen cooperation" with the ruling Chinese Communist Party to promote its policies better.

Since late 2018, with more than a billion monthly users across its mobile apps, ByteDance was valued at US$75 billion, and surpassed Uber as the world's most valuable privately held startup.

In September 2020, the United States Department of Justice called Zhang a "mouthpiece" of the Chinese Communist Party in a legal filing.

In May 2021, Zhang said that he would step down as CEO and be succeeded by Liang Rubo.

In May 2023, The New York Times reported that a former employee accused Zhang in a lawsuit of facilitating bribes to Lu Wei.

== Honors and recognition ==
Forbes named Zhang in its 2013 China 30 Under 30 list. In 2018, he was included in Fortune magazine's 40 Under 40 list. Zhang was named one of Time magazine's 100 Most Influential People of 2019. In September 2026, Fortune reported that Zhang had become the richest person in Asia, overtaking Indian businessman Gautam Adani, with an estimated net worth of $105.5 billion.

== See also ==
- Lawsuits involving TikTok
