= Lemon8 =

Social media app owned by ByteDance

- Developer: ByteDance
- Release: May 2020; 6 years ago

Stable release(s)
- iOS/iPadOS: 7.7.5 / January 8, 2025; 19 months ago
- Android: 7.8.0 / January 3, 2025; 19 months ago
- Available in: 6 languages
- List of languages English, Indonesian, Japanese, Malay, Thai, Vietnamese
- Type: Video sharing
- License: Proprietary
- Website: lemon8-app.com

Lemon8 is a social media app owned by Heliophilia Pte. Ltd., a Singapore-based company affiliated with ByteDance. Launched in Japan in 2020, modeled after Xiaohongshu, the platform focuses on lifestyle content including beauty, fashion, food, travel, and home decor. Lemon8 expanded internationally in 2023 and became integrated with TikTok in 2024.

== History ==
The app was first launched in Japan in May 2020 under the name Sharee, and hit 1 million downloads in March 2022. It launched in the United States and United Kingdom in February 2023, resulting in it becoming one of the most-downloaded apps on App Store in the United States a month later following influencer marketing campaigns.

In November 2024, Lemon8 began to be integrated with TikTok, allowing users to link their profiles between the services and find their followers.

== Platform ==
Lemon8 is an image and video sharing platform centered on lifestyle content, including beauty, fashion, travel, food, and home decor. Its interface and discovery features have been compared by commentators to Instagram, Pinterest, and Xiaohongshu. The platform has gained popularity among younger users, particularly Gen Z, for its emphasis on visually curated lifestyle content and influencer-driven posts.

== Ownership ==
While Lemon8 is credited as being a product of Heliophilia Pte. Ltd., a private company registered in Singapore, that company has the same address as TikTok's offices in the country. TikTok's global general counsel has also spoken on behalf of Lemon8.

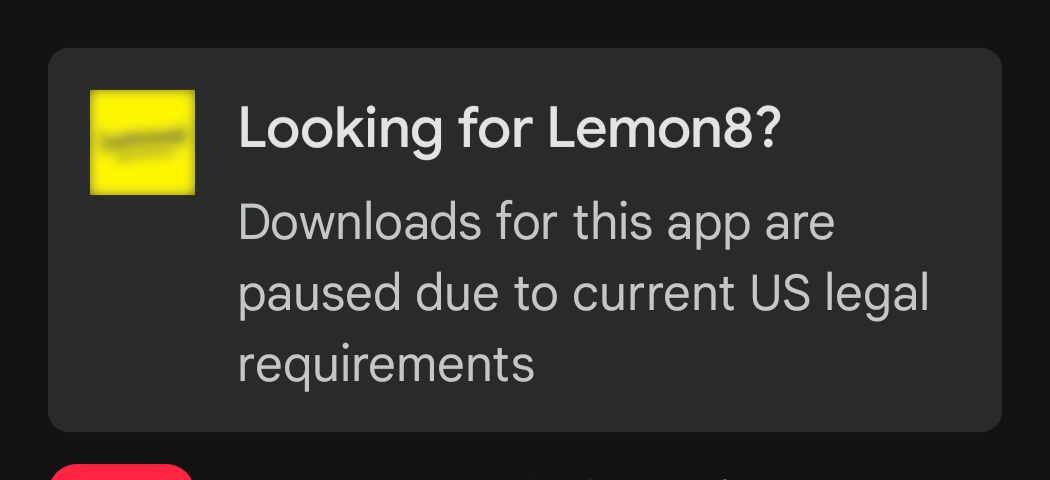
Message displayed to U.S. users who search for Lemon8 on the Google Play Store while the ban was in effect

The U.S. launch of Lemon8 coincided with scrutiny over ByteDance and TikTok's operations in the country; lawmakers expressed concerns with Lemon8 due to its connection with ByteDance, the parent company of TikTok. Lindsay Gorman, head of technology and geopolitics at the German Marshall Fund and a former tech advisor for the Biden administration, has stated "it has to do with gathering information on users and it has the same ownership structure, being a child of ByteDance, so I think the same issues are going to come up".

In January 2025, ahead of oral arguments in the United States Supreme Court over an act of Congress that would prohibit ByteDance or its subsidiaries from operating social networking services in the United States, TikTok began to increasingly carry sponsored posts that advertise Lemon8 to U.S. users. The ads promoted Lemon8 as a "backup app", emphasizing its TikTok account integration and implying that it was a platform "where the government is not 100% controlling what we see". On 19 January 2025, after the act was found constitutional, Lemon8 was included in a suspension of service for all ByteDance-owned apps in the United States. In January 2025, Texas governor Greg Abbott prohibited Lemon8 on all government devices.
