= IMile Delivery =

Logistics company headquartered in Dubai, UAE

iMile Delivery
- Type: Private
- Industry: Logistics and courier services
- Founded: June 2017; 9 years ago
- Founder: Rita Huang Zhen; Naveen Joseph; Gao Wenli; Nancy Chen
- Headquarters: Dubai, United Arab Emirates
- Key people: Rita Huang Zhen (founder and CEO)
- Services: Last-mile delivery, cash on delivery, shipment tracking, international transportation and warehousing
- Website: www.imile.com

iMile Delivery is a logistics and courier company headquartered in Dubai, United Arab Emirates. Founded in 2017.

The company has expanded beyond its initial Middle Eastern markets into Latin America, Africa, Europe and the Asia-Pacific region.

== History ==
iMile was founded in Dubai in June 2017 by Rita Huang Zhen. Naveen Joseph, Gao Wenli and Nancy Chen are co-founders of the company.

In 2018, it expanded into Saudi Arabia.

In 2020, iMile raised US$10 million in a pre-Series A financing round led by a China-based venture capital firm. The company said the funding would be used to expand its operations in the Middle East and to establish a regional research and development centre. At the time, it was planning expansion into Egypt, Kuwait and Morocco.

In November 2021, iMile raised US$40 million in a Series A funding round at a reported valuation of US$350 million. ByteDance participated in the financing.

By 2022, iMile was operating in 13 countries across the Middle East, Latin America, Africa and Australia. During that year, the company launched operations in Kuwait, Bahrain, Qatar, South Africa, Turkey and Brazil. The company subsequently continued its international expansion. In 2025, it had entered eight additional countries between 2023 and 2024.

In November 2024, iMile was introducing BYD Dolphin electric vehicles into its Australian delivery fleet.

By 2026, iMile operates in more than 30 countries worldwide.

== Operations ==
iMile provides logistics services to e-commerce companies, with services including domestic and international last-mile delivery, cash on delivery, shipment tracking, international transportation and warehousing. Its business developed initially in the United Arab Emirates and Saudi Arabia before expanding to other markets.

The company's logistics model is oriented primarily toward e-commerce merchants and cross-border sellers. Its delivery network combines domestic parcel delivery with cross-border transportation and fulfilment-related services.

According to company executives interviewed by industry publications, iMile uses digital systems to support order management, shipment tracking and delivery operations.

== Training initiatives ==
In 2024, iMile partnered with Drive Dubai on road safety training for delivery associates. CBN Middle East reported that the initiative reached more than 50 associates.

In May 2026, iMile and the Saudi Logistics Academy launched a training-to-employment programme for logistics trainees. The programme included nine months of study followed by three months of work experience, and that 12 of 25 participants had been hired by June 2026.
