= BytePlus =

Technology services arm of ByteDance

BytePlus is the enterprise technology services arm of ByteDance. Founded in 2021 and headquartered in Singapore, the company turns technologies developed in-house at ByteDance, including AI, recommendation algorithms, and cloud-native infrastructure, into B2B solutions. To comply with data regulations in different countries, BytePlus operates independently in terms of legal structure, data storage, and day-to-day operations, and its data is kept separate from TikTok's global user data. Focused squarely on international markets, BytePlus is widely seen as the international counterpart to Volcengine, ByteDance's enterprise services brand in China.

== History and Evolution ==
BytePlus began as an internal technology division at ByteDance, tasked with turning its recommendation systems and machine learning technologies into enterprise-grade API services. In 2021, the division began operating openly as a B2B technology services provider; its early publicly disclosed clients included the e-commerce platform GOAT and the travel platform Wego.

To support its international operations, BytePlus registered an operating entity in Singapore and deployed independent cloud infrastructure nodes in locations including Singapore and London. Under its compliance framework, enterprise client data is physically and logically isolated from the user data of its parent company's consumer apps, such as TikTok, and is managed independently.

BytePlus currently operates primarily as a SaaS and cloud API provider. Its offerings have evolved from early basic algorithm calls to enterprise-grade LLM services and AI-native cloud architectures. According to the company, its business model is centered on cloud-based technology services and involves neither the sale of underlying algorithm source code nor the transfer of intellectual property.
