= Dcar =

Automotive content platform owned by ByteDance

- Other names: Dongchedi
- Developer: ByteDance
- Initial release: August 2017; 8 years ago
- Operating system: Android, IOS, HarmonyOS NEXT
- Available in: 2 languages
- List of languages Simplified Chinese, English
- Type: Automotive news website
- License: Freeware
- Website: www.dongchedi.com

Dcar or Dongchedi (Chinese: 懂车帝) is an automotive content platform owned by ByteDance, officially launched in 2017. The platform was originally the automotive channel of ByteDance's news aggregation application, Toutiao. Dcar started by publishing automotive-related content and has launched several original automotive programs.

According to QuestMobile data, its mobile application has 31 million monthly active users in January 2023, and its WeChat Mini Program had 1.9 million.

== Controversies ==
=== Car testing ===
Dcar's 2023 winter endurance test was a test designed to evaluate the pure electric range achievement rate of multiple hybrid models under severe cold conditions, involving about 20 models. The results showed that the Huawei and Seres-partnered AITO M7 extended-range version ranked lowest with a range achievement rate of 31.6%. At the same time, the range achievement rates of several models from Geely and Great Wall Motor were also less than 40%. The test results were questioned by Richard Yu, CEO of Huawei's Intelligent Automotive Solution Business Unit, and Yang Xueliang, Senior Vice President of Geely Holding Group. Yu Cheng-dong angrily denounced the test on WeChat Moments as a "deceptive test that misleads the public"; Yang Xueliang stated on Weibo that the testing process was "unscientific and not rigorous," and Great Wall Motor even planned to hold a press conference in Beijing to question Dcar's winter test standards. Dcar responded by saying that the "test used a unified standard, which is consistent with users' winter car usage scenarios, and there was no differential treatment." Previously, the results of the "2023 Dcar Summer Test" also sparked questions from several car brands regarding its testing methods and results.

In June 2024, Dcar announced that the 2024 summer test process would be broadcast live. At the same time, more than ten car brands announced a joint "CATARC Summer Test" with the China Automotive Technology and Research Center Co., Ltd. Xinhua News Agency reporter Zhang Yi wrote an article commenting that Dcar does not have the professional qualifications, personnel, facilities, or testing standards for car evaluations, and is not qualified to do so.

In November 2024, Dcar purchased 30 car models for a crash test, where the results and testing method of a 30% overlap frontal crash with a large truck also sparked controversy.

In July 2025, a test of Level 2 advanced driving assistance systems by Dcar and state television CCTV revealed that in a night scenario with road construction and a truck, only 47% of the tested vehicles could successfully avoid them; when a child suddenly ran into the road, 58% of the vehicles braked to a stop. On July 25, Elon Musk reposted the video, stating that "Tesla achieved the top results in China despite having no local training data." On the same day, Harmony Intelligent Mobility Alliance and AITO's official Weibo accounts stated that they had "seen the so-called 'test' from a certain platform" and "had no comment," while attaching an image stating their safety. The results also sparked controversy on Chinese social media, and Dcar responded by saying that the online public opinion was inconsistent with the relevant facts.
