= Doubao =

Artificial intelligence assistant developed by ByteDance

- Developer: ByteDance
- Release: August 2023; 3 years ago
- Stable release: Doubao Seed 2.0 / February 14, 2026; 8 months ago
- Operating system: iOS, Android, Web
- License: Proprietary
- Website: www.doubao.com www.dola.com

Doubao (Chinese: 豆包; lit. 'bean bun') is an artificial intelligence virtual assistant developed by ByteDance.

== History ==
The Doubao chatbot was launched in August 2023. By November 2024, it had become China's most popular AI chatbot, with approximately 60 million monthly active users according to industry analytics.

By May 2026, Doubao had 330 million users. In the same month, ByteDance announced the introduction of subscription tiers to Doubao.

== Design ==
Doubao is powered by the Doubao Large Model (豆包大模型) of the Volcano Engine (or Volcengine; 火山引擎), which uses 120 trillion tokens per day.

Doubao operates mainly as a chatbot assistant which supports text, image and voice generation, alongside AI-powered search functions. It may also be used as an in-car voice assistant integrated in Mainland Chinese offerings of Tesla electric vehicles.

Doubao models use natural language processing to create a friendly, conversational image when interacting with its users.

Doubao previously permitted the creation of AI agents within the app. As of July 2026, the function is discontinued to comply with a new regulation concerning AI agents.

== Variants ==
=== Dola ===
Dola is the international version of Doubao. It was launched in August 2023, previously known as Cici.

Unlike Doubao, Dola was powered by OpenAI's GPT series of large language models and by Google's Gemini, until February 2026 when they started using in-house Seed models, rolling out fully in April 2026.
