= Dana Latham =

American attorney

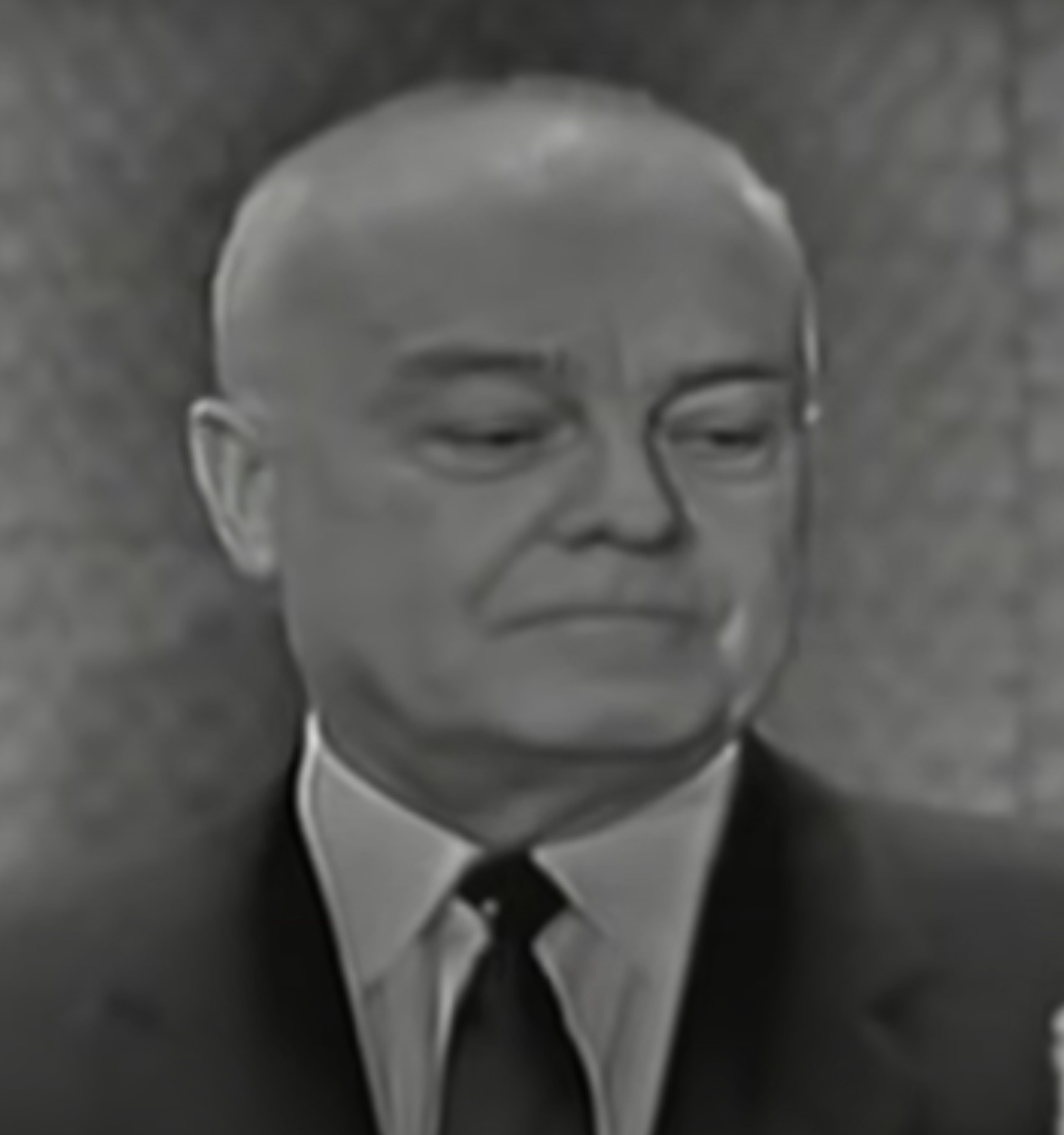
- Dana Latham in 1959

33rd Commissioner of Internal Revenue
- In office November 5, 1958 – January 20, 1961
- President: Dwight D. Eisenhower
- Preceded by: Russell C. Harrington
- Succeeded by: Mortimer Caplin

Personal details
- Born: July 7, 1898 Galesburg, Illinois, U.S.
- Died: February 6, 1974 (aged 75) Los Angeles, California, U.S.
- Party: Republican
- Education: Ohio Wesleyan University (BA); Harvard University (LLB)

Dana Latham (July 7, 1898 – February 6, 1974) was an American attorney who served as the Commissioner of Internal Revenue from 1958 to 1961. He and Paul Watkins founded Latham & Watkins. In 1950, Latham served as President of the Los Angeles County Bar Association. On March 22, 1959, Latham appeared on the television show What's My Line?

He died of a heart attack on February 6, 1974, in Los Angeles, California at age 75.
