= Xigua Video =

Chinese live streaming video platform

Xigua Video 西瓜视频
- Other names: Toutiao Video (original name)
- Developer: ByteDance
- Initial release: May 2016; 9 years ago
- Operating system: iOS, Android
- Type: Video sharing
- License: Proprietary
- Website: www.ixigua.com

Xigua Video (Chinese: 西瓜视频; pinyin: Xīguā Shìpín) is a Chinese online video-sharing platform owned by ByteDance. Originally serving primarily as a sharing platform for Toutiao's user-created short videos, Xigua now also produces film and television content. Xigua Video continuously provides content to different audiences through personalized services. As of June 2020, the platform has 131 million monthly active users.

== History ==
Xigua Video was initially launched as Toutiao Video in May 2016.

On June 8, 2017, Toutiao Video officially changed its name to Xigua Video and redesigned its logo. The name "Xigua" means "watermelon" and refers to the Chinese concept of "watermelon-eating crowd" (吃瓜群众; chīguā qúnzhòng; 'eat melon group congregation'), meaning "onlookers who just casually enjoy their melons and watch events unfold without wanting to get involved."

In November 2017, the number of users exceeded 200 million.

On November 25, 2017, Xigua Video established a co-production fund to encourage content creation with an amount of RMB 2 billion.

In January 2018, Xigua Live went online. In the same month, Xigua Video launched the first season of online live quiz show Millionaire Heroes.

In April 2018, the user volume exceeded 350 million.

In September 2018, Xigua Video announced plans to develop film and television drama segments.

In October 2018, a new brand visual image was launched, with the release of the "Kaleidoscope Plan" and "Windmill Plan" to encourage high-quality content creation.

In August 2019, the third "Xigua PLAY" video carnival was held on a cruise ship, marking the beginning of the "era of great navigation" for video creators.

In December 2019, "Top Hero" (头号英雄), a nationwide interactive knowledge live answering activity, was launched jointly with "Toutiao" and "TikTok".

On October 20, 2020, the platform announced at an annual conference that it would invest at least RMB 2 billion to incentivize creators of "middle-form" videos in the coming year.

== Partnerships ==
In April 2020, Xigua Video announced a content cooperation deal with BBC Studios to jointly produce two documentaries, Hubble: The Wonders of Space Revealed and Primates, and show other BBC Studios content on Xigua. The platform also partnered with the Discovery Channel to air documentaries such as Man vs. Wild and Life After Chernobyl.

In April 2020, Moonbug Entertainment, a London-based company, announced a partnership with Xigua Video, making content from the Little Baby Bum brand available on the platform in both English and Mandarin.
