= TikTok Music =

Music streaming service owned by ByteDance

- Developer: ByteDance
- Release: July 2023; 3 years ago
- Operating system: Android, iOS
- Predecessor: Resso
- Available in: 4 languages
- List of languages English, Indonesian, Portuguese, Spanish
- Type: Music streaming
- License: Proprietary software with Terms of Use
- Website: music.tiktok.com

TikTok Music was a music streaming app owned by ByteDance that was launched in July 2023. The service allowed users to listen to, download, and share songs. It was shut down on November 28, 2024.

== History ==
TikTok had revealed that it was working on a music app in the summer of 2022. At the time, Bytedance already had a music streaming service, Resso, running in India, Brazil, and Indonesia since 2020.

TikTok Music was first launched in Brazil and Indonesia in July 2023, replacing Resso (the app was banned in India). TikTok Music featured songs from major record companies like Universal Music Group, Warner Music Group and Sony Music Group. On July 19, 2023, TikTok Music launched in Australia, Mexico, and Singapore, inviting users to participate in the TikTok Music closed beta test.

On October 19, 2023, TikTok Music became available to the public in Australia, Singapore, and Mexico. The app's launch featured the recorded music repertoire of Sony Music Group and Warner Music Group.

In February 2024, TikTok Music was forced by Universal Music Group (UMG) to pull from its offerings all recordings by the artists and songwriters signed up by Universal. UMG was looking for new contract terms reflecting the quadrupled advertising revenue of TikTok since the last agreement had been signed. By May 2024, a new contract between UMG and TikTok was in place.
