= ByteDance =

Chinese Internet technology company

ByteDance Ltd.

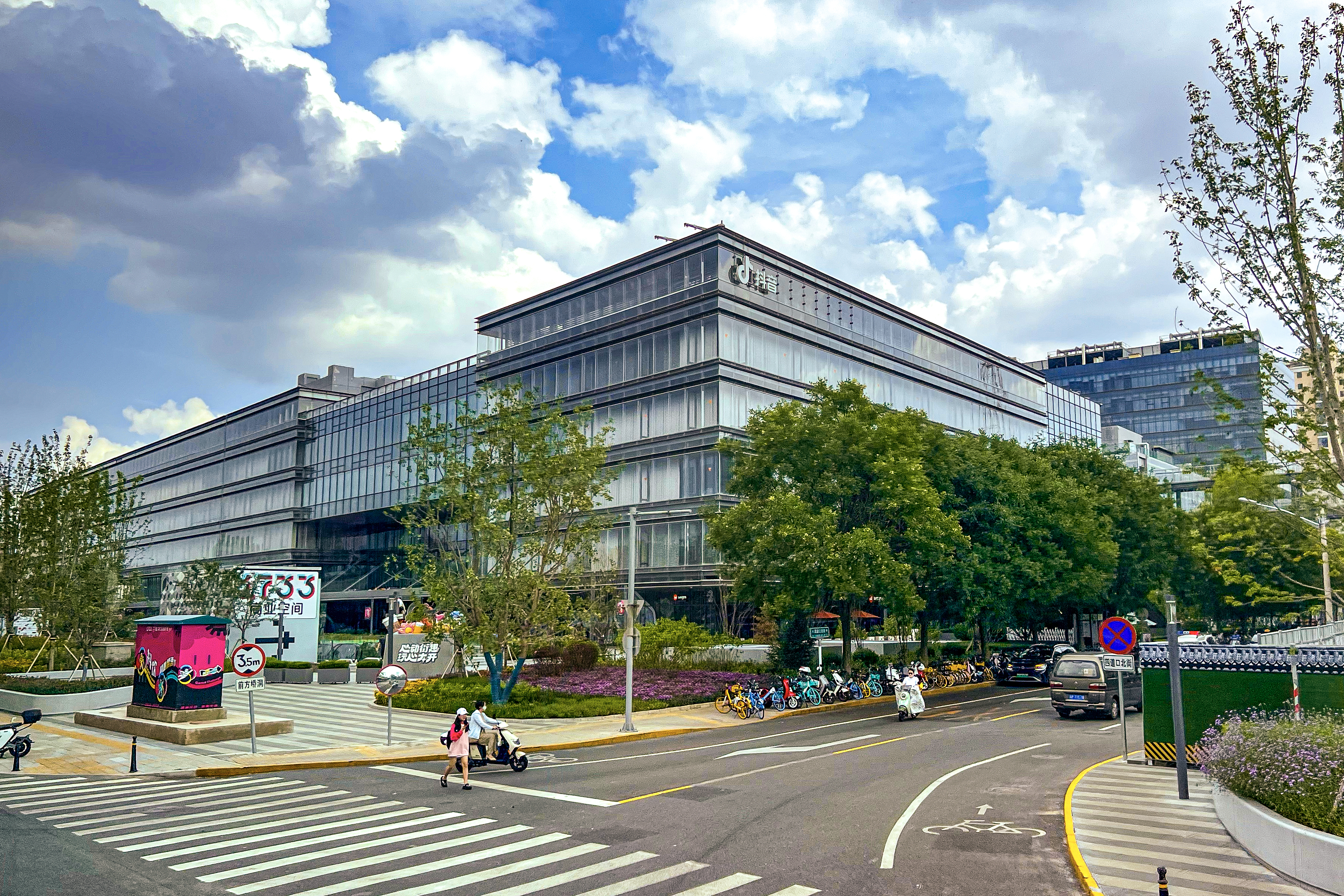
- Headquarters at Building 2, 1733 Commercial Space (also known as Dazhongsi Square), Beijing
- Native name: 字节跳动有限公司
- Formerly: Beijing ByteDance Technology Co., Ltd. (2012-2018); Douyin Group (HK) Ltd. (2018–2022)
- Type: Private
- Industry: Internet
- Incorporated: Cayman Islands (associated VIE)
- Founded: 13 March 2012; 14 years ago
- Founders: Zhang Yiming; Liang Rubo
- Headquarters: Haidian, Beijing, China; Cayman Islands (associated VIE)
- Area served: Worldwide
- Key people: Zhang Yiming (founder & chairman); Liang Rubo (founder & CEO); Erich Andersen (global GC); Kelly Zhang (CEO of ByteDance China); Lidong Zhang (chairman of ByteDance China); Shou Zi Chew (CEO of TikTok); Julie Gao (CFO)
- Products: TikTok; TikTok Music; Doubao; Seed; Seed-oss; Seedance; Seedream; CapCut; Toutiao; Whee; Lark; PICO; Lemon8; SoundOn; Baike.com; BuzzVideo; Trae (IDE)
- Revenue: ▲US$155 billion (2024)
- Net income: US$50 billion (2025, projected)
- Owner: Zhang Yiming (over 50% voting control); Sequoia Capital; SoftBank Group; KKR & Co.
- Number of employees: c. 120,000 (2025)
- Subsidiaries: Nuverse; Dcar
- Website: bytedance.com

ByteDance
- Chinese: 字节跳动
Transcriptions
Standard Mandarin
- Hanyu Pinyin: Zìjié Tiàodòng
- Bopomofo: ㄗˋ ㄐㄧㄝˊ ㄊㄧㄠˋ ㄉㄨㄥˋ
- Wade–Giles: Tzu^{4}-chieh^{2} T'iao^{4}-tung^{4}
- Tongyong Pinyin: Zìh-jié Tiào-dòng
- IPA: [tsɹ̩̂.tɕjě tʰjâʊ.tʊ̂ŋ]

ByteDance is a Chinese internet technology company based in Haidian, Beijing. Its associated variable interest entity, ByteDance Ltd, is incorporated in the Cayman Islands.

Zhang Yiming and Liang Rubo founded ByteDance in 2012 with a group of colleagues. The company developed the video-sharing app TikTok and its Chinese counterpart, Douyin, as well as the news platform Toutiao, the video-editing app CapCut, and the social media app Lemon8. It also develops generative AI models for Chinese and international markets.

ByteDance has attracted regulatory and media attention in several countries over security, surveillance, and censorship concerns.

== History ==
In 2009, software engineer and entrepreneur Zhang Yiming collaborated with his friend Liang Rubo to co-found 99fang.com, a real estate search engine. In early 2012, the pair rented an apartment in Zhongguancun and, along with several other 99fang employees, began developing an app that would use big data algorithms to classify news according to users' preferences, which would later become Toutiao. That March, Yiming and Liang founded ByteDance.

=== Launch of first apps ===
In March 2012, ByteDance launched its first app, called Neihan Duanzi (内涵段子, lit. "profound gags"). This allowed users to circulate jokes, memes, and humorous videos. Before being forced by the Chinese government to shut down in 2018, Neihan Duanzi had over 200 million users.

In August 2012, ByteDance launched the first version of news and content platform Toutiao (头条, lit. "headlines"), which would become their core product.

In January 2013, in an attempt for commercialism and nationalism, a four-part plan for the future was presented to executives. Part four of the plan was to build an English version of Toutiao to gain users in English-speaking countries. At the time, there was an app race for video views and the attention of phone users.

=== 2016 to present ===
In March 2016, ByteDance established its research arm, called the ByteDance AI Lab. It is headed by Wei-Ying Ma, the former assistant managing director of Microsoft Research Asia.

From late 2016 until 2017, ByteDance made a number of acquisitions and new product launches. In December 2016, it invested in the Indonesian news recommendation platform BABE. Two months later, in February 2017, ByteDance acquired Flipagram, which was later rebranded to Vigo Video (Hypstar) in July 2017. Vigo Video later shut down permanently on 31 October 2020. In November 2017, ByteDance acquired musical.ly for an estimated US$1 billion. At the time of acquisition, TikTok was only available in India and musical.ly was available globally. In order for TikTok to go global, ByteDance merged musical.ly with TikTok on 2 August 2018, keeping the name TikTok. In November 2017, ByteDance also acquired News Republic from Cheetah Mobile.

Since 2018, ByteDance has been in litigation with Tencent. ByteDance and its affiliates brought a series of unfair competition lawsuits against Tencent, alleging that Tencent was blocking their content. As of at least early 2024, these lawsuits had not reached resolution, largely due to disputes about jurisdiction. Tencent filed two lawsuits against ByteDance and its affiliates, alleging that they were using WeChat and QQ profiles without authorization and illegally crawling data from public WeChat accounts. Tencent obtained an injunction barring ByteDance from this practice.

In December 2018, ByteDance sued Chinese technology news site Huxiu for defamation after Huxiu reported that ByteDance-owned Indian news app Helo was propagating fake news.

In March 2021, the Financial Times reported that ByteDance was part of a group of Chinese companies that aimed to deploy technology to circumvent Apple's privacy policies.

In April 2021, ByteDance announced that it had created a new division called BytePlus to distribute the software framework underlying TikTok, so that others may launch similar apps.

In August 2021, ByteDance acquired Pico, an Oculus-like virtual reality startup.

In June 2022, the Financial Times reported on a culture clash at ByteDance's London office that led to a staff exodus.

In March 2023, The Wall Street Journal reported that former employees allege that the company engages in a practice called "horse racing", in which several teams are assigned to build the same product. When one version is deemed to perform better, the team designing the better version is provided with more support.

In April 2023, ByteDance filed a trademark for a book publisher called 8th Note Press.

ByteDance's AI team known as "Seed" was established in 2023. Its chatbot app Doubao was launched in August 2023. In December 2023, The Verge reported that ByteDance used OpenAI's API for its own generative AI projects. Afterwards, OpenAI announced that while usage by ByteDance was minimal, its account has been suspended pending further investigation whether any terms of service were violated. ByteDance stated that it had been licensed for using the API outside the Chinese market, its own chatbot is available only within China, and ChatGPT-generated data have been deleted from ByteDance's training data since the middle of 2023.

In May 2024, ByteDance laid off "a large percentage" of the 1,000 employees from its global user operations, content, and marketing teams. The global user operations team was disbanded, and remaining employees were reassigned.

In June 2024, ByteDance launched an image-sharing and social networking service called Whee.

In February 2025, ByteDance displayed OmniHuman-1, an AI system which can create realistic videos from a single image combined with motion signals such as audio or video clips. OmniHuman-1 is not available for public use.

On 12 March 2026, The Wall Street Journal reported that ByteDance was working with Aolani Cloud to deploy about 500 Nvidia Blackwell computing systems in Malaysia, totaling roughly 36,000 B200 chips.

== Corporate affairs ==
=== Funding and ownership ===
ByteDance is backed financially by Jeff Yass's Susquehanna International Group, Primavera Capital Group, Kohlberg Kravis Roberts, SoftBank Group, Sequoia Capital, General Atlantic, and Hillhouse Capital Group. As of November 2024, it was estimated to be valued at $300 billion.

ByteDance's owners include investors outside of China (60%), its founders and Chinese investors (20%), and employees (20%). In 2021, the state-owned China Internet Investment Fund purchased a 1% stake in ByteDance's main Chinese subsidiary, Beijing ByteDance Technology (formerly Beijing Douyin Information Service), as a golden share investment and seated Wu Shugang, a government official with a background in government propaganda, as one of the subsidiary's board members.

In 2023, G42 purchased a stake in ByteDance. In April 2026, the Financial Times reported that British investor Fred Blackford had built a stake worth more than $500 million in ByteDance.

=== Management ===
Zhang Yiming was ByteDance's chairman and CEO from its founding in 2012 until 2021, when co-founder Liang Rubo took over as CEO.

On 19 May 2020, ByteDance and Disney released an announcement that Kevin Mayer, head of Disney's streaming business, would join ByteDance. From June 2020 to his resignation 26 August 2020, Mayer was the CEO of TikTok and the COO of ByteDance, reporting directly to the company CEO Zhang Yiming. In 2021, Shou Zi Chew, former CFO of Xiaomi, took over as TikTok CEO.

In 2014, ByteDance established an internal Chinese Communist Party (CCP) committee. As of 2020, the company's vice president, Zhang Fuping, was secretary of its party committee. According to a report submitted to the Australian Parliament, Zhang Fuping stated that ByteDance should "transmit the correct political direction, public opinion guidance and value orientation into every business and product line."

==== Board of Directors ====
As of November 2026, the company's board consisted of the following directors:

- Liang Rubo, CEO of ByteDance
- Arthur Dantchik, managing director of Susquehanna International
- William E. Ford, CEO of General Atlantic
- Xavier Niel, French businessman and owner of Iliad SA
- Neil Shen, founding and managing partner of HSG

=== Partnerships ===
ByteDance has a strategic partnership with the Chinese Ministry of Public Security for the ministry's public relations efforts. The partnership also said that ByteDance would work with the Ministry of Public Security in cooperation on unspecified "offline activities".

In 2018, ByteDance helped to establish the Beijing Academy of Artificial Intelligence, an initiative backed by the Ministry of Science and Technology and the Beijing municipal government.

In 2019, ByteDance formed joint ventures with Beijing Time, a publisher controlled by the Beijing municipal CCP committee, and with Shanghai Dongfang, a state media firm in Shanghai. In 2021, ByteDance announced that its partnership with Shanghai Dongfang had never been in operation and was disbanded.

In June 2022, ByteDance partnered with Shanghai United Media Group to launch a plan to develop domestic and foreign influencers.

On 1 December 2025, ByteDance announced the launch of their AI voice assistant which will be made available in Chinese smartphones. The artificial intelligence voice control tool will first debut on ZTE's Nubia M153 handset, and will be powered by ByteDance's Doubao large language model.

=== Lobbying and advocacy campaigns ===
According to disclosures filed under the Lobbying Disclosure Act of 1995, ByteDance has lobbied the United States Congress, White House, Department of Commerce, Department of State, and the Department of Defense. Bills targeted include the United States Innovation and Competition Act, American Innovation and Choice Online Act, the annual National Defense Authorization Act, and the Protecting Americans from Foreign Adversary Controlled Applications Act.

The company has hired K&L Gates, LGL Advisors, and other firms. ByteDance spent more than $17.7 million on lobbying from its first report in 2019 up to July 2023, and its 2023 lobbying expense added up to $8.7 million.

In March 2024, ByteDance responded to ad campaigns by anti-TikTok advocacy groups calling to ban the app by launching its own $2.1 million marketing campaign in states with competitive 2024 Senate races, including Nevada, Montana, Wisconsin, Pennsylvania, and Ohio.

== Products ==
=== CapCut ===
First released to the public in April 2020, CapCut is a video editing software made for beginners. As of March 2023, CapCut has more than 200 million active users each month, and according to The Wall Street Journal, it was downloaded more than the TikTok app in March 2023. In March 2023, it was the second-most downloaded app in the U.S. behind that for Chinese discount retailer, Temu.

=== Doubao ===
Doubao (Chinese: 豆包; lit. 'bean bun') is an artificial intelligence virtual assistant developed by ByteDance.

=== Douyin ===
First released to the public in September 2016, Douyin (Chinese: 抖音; pinyin: Dǒuyīn), previously named A.me, is the Chinese version of TikTok. The application is a short-form video social media platform that differs from its international counterpart version by having more advanced features. TikTok and Douyin have almost the same user interface but no access to each other's content. Douyin also has more features than TikTok. Their servers are each based in the market where the respective app is available.

=== Lark ===
First released to the public in 2019, Lark is ByteDance's enterprise collaboration platform. Lark was originally developed as an internal tool, becoming ByteDance's primary internal communication and collaboration platform, but was eventually made available to external users in certain markets.

=== TikTok ===
First released to the public in September 2017, TikTok is a video-sharing social networking service used to make short-form videos, from genres like dance, comedy, and education. On 9 November 2017, ByteDance acquired Shanghai-based social media start-up Musical.ly for up to US$1 billion. ByteDance merged Musical.ly into TikTok on 2 August 2018, keeping the TikTok name.

==== TikTok Music ====
Formerly known as Resso, TikTok Music launched in Indonesia and Brazil in July 2023. On 19 October 2023, TikTok Music premiered in Mexico, Singapore and Australia.

The platform allows users to highlight and share lyrics, comments and other user-generated content with each other alongside streaming of full-length tracks. ByteDance says that it has licensing agreements in place with Warner Music Group, Sony Music Entertainment, Merlin Network and Beggars Group, among others. Resso was shut down in India in January 2024, due to "local market conditions".

On 24 September 2024, ByteDance announced that TikTok Music would shut down on 28 November 2024.

=== Toutiao ===
Toutiao (Chinese: 今日头条; pinyin: Jīnrì Tóutiáo), launched in August 2012, started out as a news recommendation engine and gradually evolved into a platform delivering content in various formats, such as texts, images, question-and-answer posts, microblogs, and videos.

In January 2014, the company created the "Toutiaohao" (头条号) platform to attract more content creators. Later in the year, it added video capabilities. Toutiao used interest-based and decentralized distribution to help long tail content creators find an audience.

In 2017, Toutiao acquired Flipagram. ByteDance would later expand Toutiao's features to include: a missing person alerts project whose alerts have helped find 13,116 missing persons as of June 2020; short-form video platform Toutiao Video, later rebranded as Xigua Video (西瓜视频, also known as Watermelon Video), which hosts video clips that are on average 2–5 minutes long; and Toutiao Search, a search engine.

=== Xigua Video ===
Initially launched as Toutiao Video in 2016, Xigua Video (Chinese: 西瓜视频; pinyin: Xīguā shìpín) is an online video-sharing platform that features user-created short and mid-length videos and also produces film and television content.

=== Nuverse ===
Initially launched in 2019, Nuverse has launched as a video game publisher company. The first game launched outside mainland China was Warhammer 40,000: Lost Crusade in 2021. Later in 2021, Moonton became a subsidiary of Nuverse, after winning the bid, initially set by Tencent.

In 2022, the studio has launched Marvel Snap in October worldwide, after closed alpha testing in the Philippines, and gradually entering open beta with the first country being New Zealand. In November 2023, Reuters reported ByteDance was restructuring Nuverse and retreating from gaming.

On January 18, 2025, Marvel Snap was banned in the United States, but service has been restored since January 21 following Trump's inauguration of delaying PAFACA. On January 27, the game re-added to the App Store.

=== Volcano Engine ===
Volcano Engine, founded in 2021, is ByteDance's cloud computing unit. In September 2024, Volcano Engine introduced its own generator of AI-generated videos.

=== Whee ===
Whee, an image-sharing and messaging app, launched to the public in June 2024 but not the US.

=== Seed and Seed-oss ===
Seed is a proprietary large language model while seed-oss is an open-source large language model. Both are available in the US.

=== Seedream ===
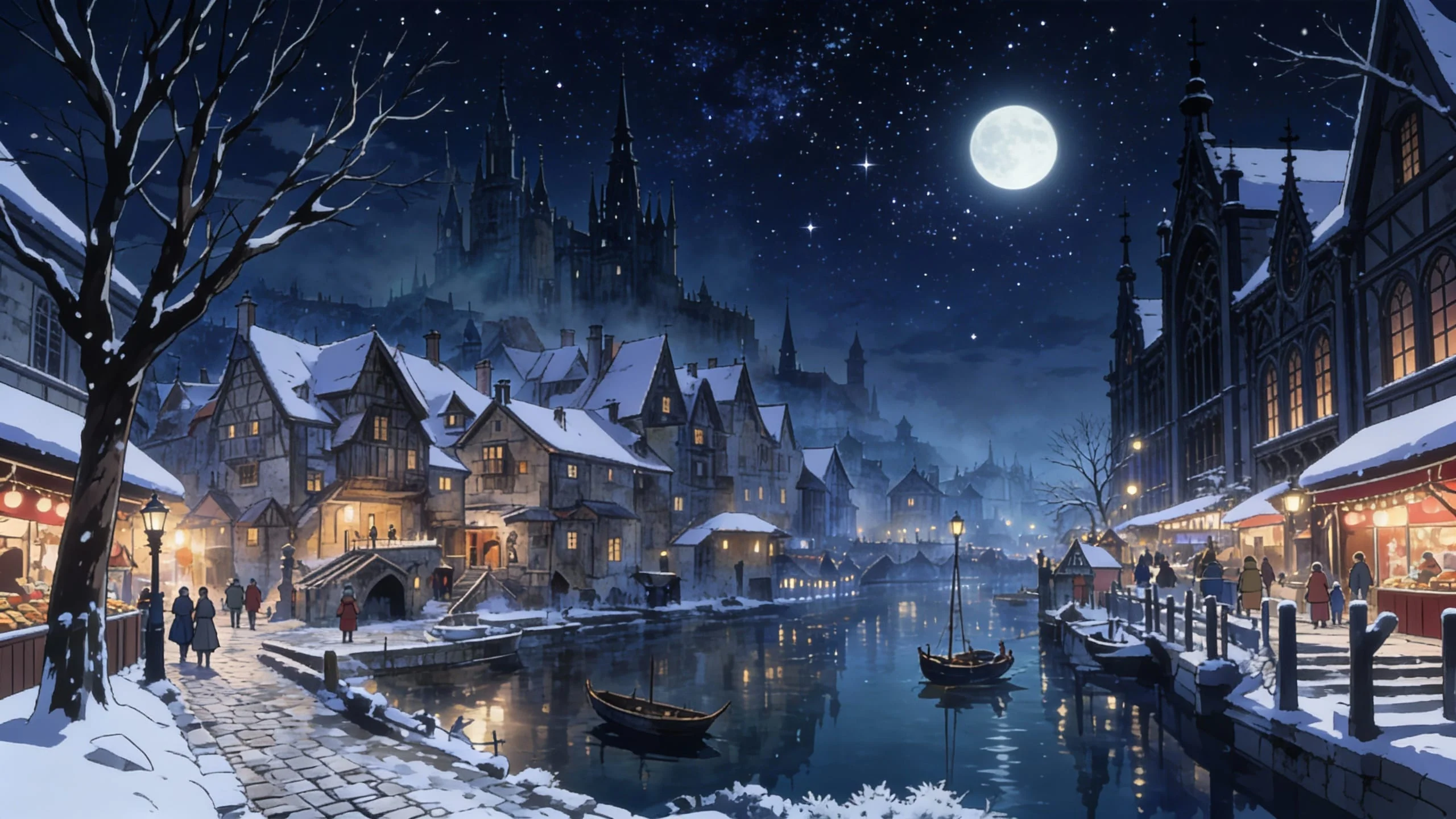
Example of an AI-generated image by Seedream 4.5, this image was generated with two source images (image-to-image generation)

Seedream is a text-to-image model. It has editing and generation capabilities.

=== Seedance ===
Seedance is an image-to-video and text-to-video model. In February 2026, ByteDance released an updated model dubbed Seedance 2.0. After the release, the Motion Picture Association accused ByteDance of copyright infringement over Seedance 2.0.

=== Other products and acquisitions ===
- Gogokid was launched in May 2018 as an online English learning platform for children that provides one-on-one classes with native English speakers. In August 2021, ByteDance announced that the app business will be shuttered and most of Gogokid's staff will be laid off, following new regulations imposed on the after-school tutoring industry in China.
- Moonton was acquired by ByteDance in 2021 and was the developer of the mobile eSports game Mobile Legends: Bang Bang. It was sold to Savvy Games Group in 2026.
- Neihan Duanzi, ByteDance's first app, was shut down in 2018 following a crackdown by the national media regulator.
- Party Island (Chinese: 派对岛; pinyin: Pàiduì dǎo) is a social media app that allows users to create avatars, join virtual events like concerts, and chat with other participants. It also has a messaging function within the app, so users can send texts to each other privately and join group chats. It is open to public testing in July 2022.
- TopBuzz was a content platform for videos, articles, breaking news and GIFs. It was launched in 2015 and abandoned in 2020 due to dwindling business. Former employees alleged that TopBuzz was used to push soft content messaging sympathetic to China in overseas markets; this was denied by ByteDance.
- 8th Note Press, a publisher established by ByteDance in 2023. In June 2025, 8th Note Press abruptly shutdown and returned publication rights to authors.
- LetsChat, a messaging and video/voice calling app, was launched in March 2021. It was mainly marketed in Africa with lower data usage as a selling point, with local teams and incentives for social media personalities used to market the app. It was downloaded 7 million times, mostly in Nigeria, but due to relatively low uptake the service was discontinued in March 2024.
- iMile Delivery is a logistics company headquartered in Dubai which founded in 2017.

== Censorship, surveillance, and data privacy concerns ==
ByteDance has garnered attention over surveillance, data privacy, and censorship concerns, including content pertaining to human rights in Tibet and the persecution of Uyghurs in China. (Note: See references:) Concerns about the potential effects, including extraterritorial jurisdiction, of China's National Intelligence Law and Cybersecurity Law on ByteDance and its employees have been raised in a 2023 submission to the Parliament of Australia and in The New York Times.

In September 2024, the Federal Trade Commission released a report summarizing 9 company responses (including from ByteDance) to orders made by the agency pursuant to Section 6(b) of the Federal Trade Commission Act of 1914 to provide information about user and non-user data collection (including of children and teenagers) and data use by the companies that found that the companies' user and non-user data practices put individuals vulnerable to identity theft, stalking, unlawful discrimination, emotional distress and mental health issues, social stigma, and reputational harm.

== Government regulation ==
=== China ===
In April 2018, China's state media regulator, the National Radio and Television Administration (NRTA), ordered the temporary removal of Toutiao and Neihan Duanzi from Chinese app stores. The NRTA accused Neihan Duanzi in particular of hosting "vulgar" and "improper" content and "triggering strong sentiments of resentment among internet users". The following day, Neihan Duanzi announced it was permanently shutting down. In response to the shutdown, Zhang issued a letter stating that the app was "incommensurate with socialist core values" and promised that ByteDance would "further deepen cooperation" with the authorities to promote their policies. Following the shutdown, ByteDance announced that it would give preference to Chinese Communist Party members in its hiring and increase its censors from 6,000 to 10,000 employees.

As of 2019, ByteDance's Beijing headquarters has maintained an office where cybersecurity police are stationed so that illegal content can be instantly reported. In November 2019, the Cyberspace Administration of China (CAC) ordered ByteDance to remove "slanderous" information on Fang Zhimin from Toutiao. In April 2020, the CAC ordered ByteDance to take down its office collaboration tool, Lark, because it could be used to circumvent Internet censorship. In January 2021, Chinese regulators fined ByteDance for spreading "vulgar information". In April 2021, ByteDance was among 13 online platforms ordered by the People's Bank of China to adhere to tighter data and financial regulations. The bank stated that ByteDance must conduct comprehensive self-examination and rectification to adhere to the country's laws. In May 2021, the CAC stated that ByteDance had engaged in illegal data collection and misuse of personal information.

In March 2021, the State Administration for Market Regulation fined a ByteDance subsidiary and other companies for antitrust violations.

In April 2022, ByteDance announced that it would report users' content on Toutiao and Douyin that engaged in "historical nihilism" in contradiction of official CCP history.

In November 2022, during the 2022 COVID-19 protests in China, the CAC directed ByteDance to intensify its censorship of the protests.

In November 2023, Forbes reported that ByteDance's internal workplace tool called Feishu, which contains "product network security, data security, personal information, and daily operations," was accessed by the CAC and other Chinese government authorities in the run-up to the 20th National Congress of the Chinese Communist Party.

In September 2025, the CAC launched a crackdown on ByteDance's Toutiao, citing content on the app promoting "negative outlooks on life such as world-weariness."

=== India ===
Citing national security issues the Indian Government banned CapCut and TikTok along with 58 other Chinese apps on 29 June 2020. The ban was made permanent in January 2021. In March 2021, the Indian government froze ByteDance's bank accounts in the country for alleged tax evasion, which ByteDance disputed.

=== Ireland ===
In 2023, ByteDance was scrutinized by the Central Bank of Ireland for deficiencies in its anti-money laundering controls of its payment division.

=== Taiwan ===
In December 2022, Taiwan's Mainland Affairs Council announced an investigation into ByteDance on suspicion of operating an illegal subsidiary in the country. The company reportedly registered "Tiktoktaiwan Co Ltd" in March, which changed its name to "ByteDance Taiwan" in November.

=== Turkey ===
In 2022, Turkey's Financial Crimes Investigation Board (MASAK) initiated a probe into ByteDance in relation to millions of dollars in fund transfers involving TikTok accounts that were suspected of money laundering or terrorism financing.

=== United States ===
U.S. Supreme Court ruling on TikTok v. Garland

In 2019, ByteDance's subsidiary TikTok agreed to pay a civil penalty to settle Federal Trade Commission (FTC) allegations that it had violated the Children's Online Privacy Protection Act. In response, ByteDance added a kids-only mode to TikTok which blocks the upload of videos, the building of user profiles, direct messaging, and commenting on other's videos, while still allowing the viewing and recording of content. In August 2024, the FTC and U.S. Department of Justice filed a joint lawsuit alleging violations of the 2019 consent decree with the FTC.

TikTok and ByteDance have come under US lawmaker scrutiny due to concerns of surveillance by the Chinese government. In 2020, U.S. President Donald Trump issued executive orders seeking to force a sale of TikTok or bar it from US app stores; courts blocked the orders, and his successor, Joe Biden, revoked them. On 28 August 2020, China announced an update to its export control rules that The New York Times reported could give Chinese authorities a say in any potential sale of ByteDance's technology to foreign firms.

In December 2022, ByteDance said it had fired four employees who accessed the TikTok data of journalists while trying to identify the sources of leaks. In March 2023, Forbes reported that the Department of Justice and the Federal Bureau of Investigation had opened an investigation into the matter.

In March 2024 the House of Representatives passed a bill which, if passed through the Senate and signed by the President, would force ByteDance to divest TikTok or have the platform banned. In April, the United States Congress passed a modified version of the bill in a foreign aid package. The bill was signed into law by President Joe Biden on 24 April 2024, giving ByteDance until 19 January 2025, to divest TikTok.

In November 2024, Donald Trump changed his opinion and spoke out against a ban of the platform in the US after ByteDance investor Jeff Yass had donated to his election campaign. On January 18, 2025, TikTok and four other ByteDance apps (CapCut, Lemon8, Gauth and Hypic) stopped operating in the United States hours before the law took effect.

==== TikTok, Inc. v. Garland ====
TikTok, Inc. v. Garland, 604 U.S. 56 (2025), was a United States Supreme Court case brought by ByteDance Ltd. and TikTok challenging the constitutionality of the Protecting Americans from Foreign Adversary Controlled Applications Act (PAFACA) based on the Freedom of Speech Clause of the First Amendment, the Bill of Attainder Clause of Article One, Section Nine. The case was consolidated with Firebaugh v. Garland, a lawsuit TikTok content creators filed which also challenged the law.

== Sources ==
- Benson, Peter J.; Brannon, Valerie C.; Lampe, Joanna R. (9 May 2024). Regulation of TikTok Under the Protecting Americans from Foreign Adversary Controlled Applications Act: Analysis of Selected Legal Issues (Report). Congressional Research Service.
- Sutherland, Michael D.; Benson, Peter J.; Cho, Clare Y. (14 May 2024). TikTok: Frequently Asked Questions and Issues for Congress (Report). Congressional Research Service.
- Benson, Peter J.; Brannon, Valerie C.; Linebaugh, Chris D.; Lampe, Joanna R.; Mulligan, Stephen P. (15 March 2024). Restricting TikTok (Part II): Legislative Proposals and Considerations for Congress (Report). Congressional Research Service.
- Benson, Peter J.; Brannon, Valerie C.; Lampe, Joanna R. (19 December 2024). TikTok v. Garland: Constitutional Challenges to the Protecting Americans from Foreign Adversary Controlled Applications Act (Report). Congressional Research Service.
