= Lark (software) =

Collaboration platform

Lark Suite
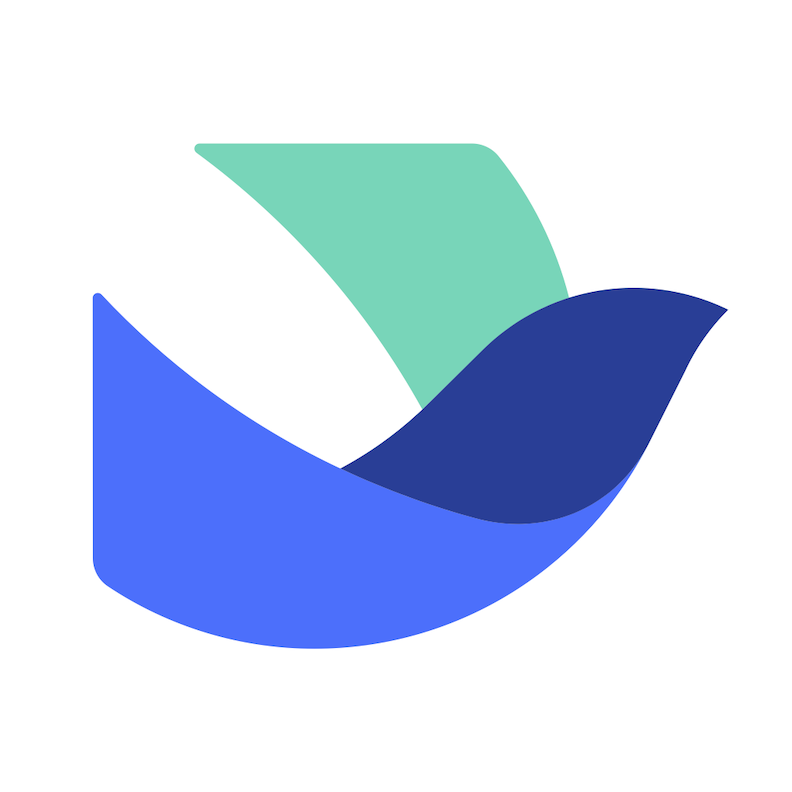
- Other names: Feishu
- Original author: Lark Technologies Pte. Ltd.
- Developer: ByteDance
- Release: April 2019; 7 years ago
- Written in: Dart
- Engine: Flutter
- Operating system: iOS, Android, MacOS, IPadOS, Microsoft Windows
- Available in: 15 languages
- List of languages English, Simplified Chinese, Japanese, French, German, Hindi, Indonesian, Italian, Korean, Portuguese, Russian, Spanish, Thai, Chinese, Vietnamese
- Type: Collaborative software
- License: Proprietary
- Website: larksuite.com

Lark Suite is an enterprise collaboration platform developed by ByteDance and first released to the public in 2019.

Lark and its China-only equivalent Feishu ("flying message") operate independently of one another and store user data separately (Lark in Singapore, Feishu in Beijing).

== History ==
Lark was developed by Lark Technologies Pte. Ltd., a subsidiary of ByteDance, based in Singapore, and was originally developed as an internal tool.

In November 2018, Lark became ByteDance's internal communication and collaboration platform.

In April 2019, Lark became available in overseas markets.

In March 2020, ByteDance prepared to release a "Google-like suite of office collaboration tools" (referencing Google Workspace) focusing on cloud-based file management and document and spreadsheet editing.

In April 2020, during the COVID-19 pandemic, Lark made its service available for free across Southeast Asia.

As of January 18th 2025, Lark was banned in the United States, along with all other ByteDance apps, due to the implementation of the Protecting Americans from Foreign Adversary Controlled Applications Act, making it inaccessible to American citizens. Despite this it is still available to download and listed as being updated as recently as September 2026 on the iOS App Store and Google Play store.

== See also ==
- List of office suites
