= Russell C. Harrington =

American Commissioner of Internal Revenue

32nd Commissioner of Internal Revenue
- In office December 5, 1955 – September 30, 1958
- President: Dwight D. Eisenhower
- Preceded by: T. Coleman Andrews
- Succeeded by: Dana Latham

Personal details
- Born: November 9, 1890; Taunton, Massachusetts
- Died: August 7, 1971 (aged 80); Bethesda, Maryland
- Political party: Republican

Russell C. Harrington (November 9, 1890 – August 7, 1971) was an American accountant who served as the Commissioner of Internal Revenue from 1955 to 1958.
