= Shou Zi Chew =

Singaporean business executive (born 1983)

- 周受资
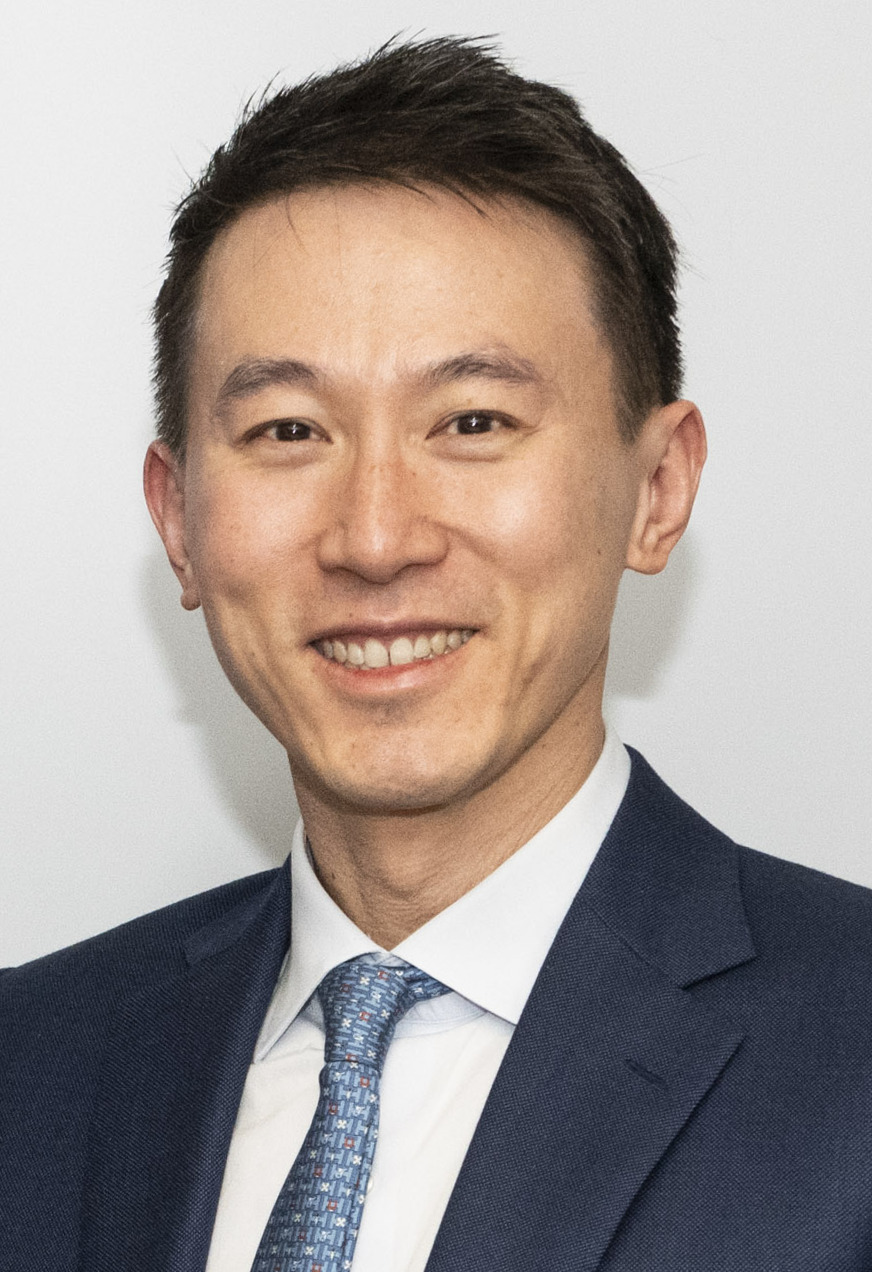
- Chew in 2023
- Born: 1 January 1983 (age 43); Singapore
- Education: University College London (BSc); Harvard University (MBA)
- Occupation: Business executive
- Years active: 2006–present
- Title: Former CFO of Xiaomi (2015–2021); Former CFO of ByteDance (2021); CEO of TikTok (2021–present)
- Spouse: Vivian Kao

Chinese name
- Simplified Chinese: 周受资
- Traditional Chinese: 周受資
Transcriptions
Standard Mandarin
- Hanyu Pinyin: Zhōu Shòuzī
- Bopomofo: ㄓㄡ ㄕㄡˋ ㄗ
- Wade–Giles: Chou^{1} Shou^{4}-tzu^{1}
- Tongyong Pinyin: Jhou Shòu-zih
- IPA: [ʈʂóʊ ʂôʊ.tsɹ̩́]
Southern Min
- Hokkien POJ: Chiu-Siū-Chu
- Shou Zi Chew's voice Chew's opening statement at a hearing before the United States House Energy and Commerce Committee; Recorded 23 March 2023
- Website: tiktok.com/@shou.time

Shou Zi Chew (Note: Chinese: 周受资; pinyin: Zhōu Shòuzī) (born 1 January 1983) is a Singaporean business executive who has been the chief executive officer (CEO) of TikTok, an online video platform owned by Chinese company ByteDance, since 2021. He was also the previously chief financial officer (CFO) of Xiaomi.

== Early life and education ==
Chew was born on 1 January 1983 in Singapore, growing up in the Yio Chu Kang subzone of Ang Mo Kio. His father reportedly worked in construction and his mother in bookkeeping. Upon graduating from Hwa Chong Institution, In 2001, Chew went on to serve 2.5 years of full-time National Service in the Singapore Armed Forces, where he was commissioned as an officer at the Officer Cadet School. He eventually achieved the rank of Captain during his subsequent reservist cycles.

After his military service, Chew went on to study at University College London in England. He graduated from the college in 2006 with a Bachelor of Science in economics. In 2010, he completed a Master of Business Administration degree at Harvard Business School, and while there completed a summer internship at Facebook prior to its IPO.

== Career ==
After graduating from University College London in 2006, he stayed on in London to work as an investment banker for Goldman Sachs for two years before he joined Yuri Milner's venture capital firm DST Global as a partner. At the Russian investment firm DST Global, Chew led investment into JD.com, Alibaba, and Xiaomi. He also led a team of early investors in ByteDance in 2013.

In 2015, Chew joined Xiaomi as its chief financial officer. In 2019, he became Xiaomi's foreign business president.

In March 2021, Chew joined ByteDance as its chief financial officer. He subsequently replaced TikTok CEO Kevin A. Mayer, who left the ByteDance subsidiary after four months on the job.

In March 2023, Chew testified before the United States Congress regarding the legislative effort to ban TikTok in the United States. Following the testimony, then senator Marco Rubio requested the U.S. Department of Justice investigate Chew for perjury. Chew testified again in January 2024, during a United States Senate Judiciary Committee hearing regarding legislation on child internet safety.

He was the honorary chairperson of the 2024 Met Gala as TikTok was the lead sponsor of the event. Chew was recognized as one of the most impactful Asians in 2024 by Gold House. In December 2024, Chew met with Donald Trump at Mar-a-Lago to lobby against a ban of TikTok under the Protecting Americans from Foreign Adversary Controlled Applications Act. Chew was present at Trump's inauguration.

== Personal life ==
Chew is married to Vivian Kao, a Taiwanese American businesswoman. They met as classmates at Harvard.
