= Variable interest entity =

Special-purpose legal entity and investment vehicle

A variable interest entity (VIE) is a legal structure defined by the Financial Accounting Standards Board (FASB) for situations where control over a legal entity may be demonstrated through means other than voting rights. A public company with a financial interest in such entities may be subject to certain financial reporting requirements.

VIEs gained notoriety in the early 2000s due to their role in the Enron scandal, where the company used special-purpose entities to hide mounting losses from investors. VIEs have also been employed by Chinese companies, such as Alibaba, to circumvent Chinese government regulations that restrict foreign ownership of certain assets and industries, thus gaining access to foreign capital.

VIEs have faced criticism for their lack of transparency and limited rights provided to foreign investors, with some experts calling for the banning of future listings and delisting of existing Chinese companies using VIEs.

== Background ==
The FASB's Accounting Standards Codification (ASC) 810, Consolidation, provides accounting guidance on when a reporting entity (e.g., a public company) should consolidate a legal entity as a subsidiary in the reporting entity's financial statements. If consolidated, the reporting entity will account for the subsidiary's assets, liabilities and any non-controlling interests of that legal entity in the reporting entity's consolidated financial statements. In order to determine whether a legal entity should be consolidated, the reporting entity must first assess whether the legal entity is a VIE. An entity that is not a variable interest entity is referred to as a voting interest entity. Under the voting interest entity model, a reporting entity with ownership of a majority of the voting interests of a legal entity will generally consolidate that legal entity. However, the VIE model was established for situations in which control may be demonstrated other than by the possession of voting rights in a legal entity. Accordingly, ASC 810 requires that all consolidation analysis first consider whether a legal entity is a VIE before applying the guidance for voting interest entities.

VIEs came to prominence after Enron made "creative" use of special-purpose entities to conceal widening losses from its investors at the beginning of the 2000s. For Chinese companies, VIEs have allowed them to get access to foreign capital that would otherwise not be available due to Chinese government regulations against foreign ownership of certain assets and industries.

== Characteristics ==
A VIE is a legal entity with any of the three criteria outlined in FASB ASC 810-10-15-14, as follows:

- The entity does not have enough equity to finance its activities without additional subordinated financial support (e.g., the entity is thinly capitalized)
- The equity holders, as a group, lack any one of the common characteristics of a controlling financial interest:
  - The power to direct the economic activities of the entity through voting rights
  - The obligation to absorb expected losses
  - The claim on residual returns (also known as the "residual claimant")
- The entity is structured with non-substantive voting rights (commonly known as the "anti-abuse test")

== VIE shares vs. traditional stock certificates ==
A share of stock, or a stock certificate, certifies ownership of a portion of a company. In other words, it provides proof of a legal proprietary interest in company assets.

In contrast, a VIE share (often mistakenly referred to as a share of stock) certifies ownership of a contractual right to a percentage of a company's profits. Unlike a traditional stock certificate, the VIE share provides a legal proprietary interest in a completely separate company's assets, sometimes referred to as a shell company. The contractual right certified by the VIE share is derived from a contract between (1) the company named on the VIE share and (2) the shell company.

In other words, VIE shareholders only have a traditional stock certificate in the completely separate shell company, which is entitled to a percentage of the named company's profits via a private contract.

=== Alibaba as an example ===
Nearly all Chinese technology firms are structured as VIEs. For example, Alibaba, the largest retailer and e-commerce company in China, uses a VIE structure allowing U.S. investors to purchase VIE shares in Alibaba on the New York Stock Exchange (NYSE). In September 2014, under the ticker symbol BABA, Alibaba went public on the NYSE at a VIE share price of around $68.

BABA shareholders own a stake, through American depositary shares, in Alibaba Group Holding Limited, a Cayman Islands–registered entity, which is under contract to receive a percentage of the profits from Alibaba's assets in China. BABA shareholders do not have any proprietary interest in the Chinese-registered Alibaba company's assets; they only have an indirect stake in part of the company's profits.

The following is an excerpt from the Cayman Islands–registered Alibaba's Form F-1:

"Due to PRC legal restrictions on foreign ownership and investment in, among other areas, value-added telecommunications services, which include Internet content providers, or ICPs, we, similar to all other entities with foreign-incorporated holding company structures operating in our industry in China, operate our Internet businesses and other businesses in which foreign investment is restricted or prohibited in the PRC through wholly-foreign owned enterprises, majority-owned entities and variable interest entities. The relevant variable interest entities, which are 100% owned by PRC citizens or by PRC entities owned by PRC citizens, hold the ICP licenses and operate the various websites for our Internet businesses. Specifically, our variable interest entities are generally majority-owned by Jack Ma, our lead founder, executive chairman and one of our principal shareholders, and minority-owned by Simon Xie, one of our founders and a member of our management. These contractual arrangements collectively enable us to exercise effective control over, and realize substantially all of the economic risks and benefits arising from, the variable interest entities... The contractual arrangements may not be as effective in providing operational control as direct ownership."

VIEs are controversial in China and various Chinese regulatory agencies have expressed conflicting views on their legitimacy. In February 2021, regulations promulgated by the State Administration of Market Regulation came into effect, which among other provisions state that a VIE structure will no longer be exempt from merger review. In July 2021, Bloomberg News reported that VIEs that have gone public may receive further scrutiny from Chinese regulators in their future offerings. Beginning in November 2020 and running through at least the end of 2021, SAMR began a major increase in the number of prior mergers involving VIEs that it reviewed. SAMR imposed a fine in a significant number of these cases, but the fines were relatively low.

== Criticism ==
Robert D. Atkinson, an economist and president of the Information Technology and Innovation Foundation, said that VIEs have allowed U.S. investors to buy into "opaque" offshore shell companies of Chinese businesses. He said that "U.S. investors not only have few rights, they also have limited insights into the inner workings of [the] firms", adding, "In contrast to other firms listed on U.S. exchanges, Chinese firms do not undergo public audits reviewed by U.S. regulators." Atkinson suggested banning future listing of Chinese companies, as well as delisting existing ones.
