= Wego.com =

Singapore-based travel search engine

Wego Pte Ltd.
- Type: Private
- Industry: Travel
- Founded: 2005; 21 years ago in Singapore
- Headquarters: Singapore and Dubai
- Area served: Worldwide
- Key people: Ross Veitch (CEO & Co-founder); Craig Hewett (Co-founder); Mamoun Hmedan (GM MENA & India); Dean Wicks (Chief Flights Officer)
- Products: Flights, Hotels, Holiday Deals
- Number of employees: 200
- Website: www.wego.com

Wego is a travel app for flight search and booking in the MENA (Middle East and North Africa).

Formerly known as Bezurk, Wego is a travel metasearch engine that was founded in Singapore in 2005. The company is headquartered in both Singapore and Dubai. It operates 76 country sites (CcTLD) in over 22 languages and local currencies. Wego enables users to compare hotel and flight deals, generating search results tailored to their specific travel needs.

Wego displays a comprehensive list of local and international airfares and hotel search results from a variety of sources, including online travel agencies (OTA), airlines, and hotels. Users can access these results through either the desktop website or the travel app for iOS and Android. After selecting a deal, the user is redirected to the travel supplier to complete the booking.

== History & Milestones ==
Founding and Rebranding

Wego, originally known as Bezurk, was established in Singapore in 2005 by Ross Veitch and Craig Hewett. The company underwent a rebranding in May 2008 due to the original name being considered “hard to remember and spell.”

Funding Rounds

Wego’s first funding round, Series A, took place in January 2008, where it received US$4.5 million from News Digital Media, the digital division of News Limited. This was followed by a Series B funding round in December 2010, where the company secured US$13 million from Tiger Global Management. In June 2013, Wego closed its Series C funding round with an investment of US$17 million from Tiger Global Management, Crescent Point Group, and SquarePeg Capital. The company continued to attract investments with a Series D round in October 2015 that raised US$11 million from existing investors Tiger Global Management and Crescent Point Group. The most recent funding round, Series E, occurred in August 2017 and raised US$12 million from the Middle East Broadcasting Center.

Expansion and Growth

In 2013, Wego expanded its operations by launching regional offices in Bangalore, Jakarta, and Dubai. The company’s initial penetration into the Middle Eastern market in 2012 proved successful as its revenue soared to US$1 billion worth of gross travel bookings across its entire business by 2018. In 2022, Wego holds the number 1 rank in terms of travel bookings in the KSA.

In February 2023, Wego earned the distinction of being the most downloaded travel app for flight-focused brands in the MENA region. This achievement was marked by a year-over-year growth of over 157.7% and 143,002 downloads. In May 2025, Wego maintained the title of the most downloaded flight search and booking app across MENA for the third consecutive year and held the position of the region's most downloaded travel app year-to-date.

Recognition

In 2019, Wego received recognition from the World Economic Forum and the Bahrain Economic Development Board as one of the 100 most promising Arab start-ups shaping the Fourth Industrial Revolution.

In 2025, Wego was awarded Best Online Travel Marketplace - KSA at the inaugural Arabian Travel Awards Saudi Arabia.

In 2026, International Business Magazine, a media company based in Dubai, named Wego as the winner of Best Mobile Travel App UAE 2026.

Product Launches and Acquisitions

In 2020, Wego introduced the ability for users to complete flight and hotel bookings directly on the platform, via its Book on Wego feature. CEO Veitch indicated in a 2019 interview that the feature had been "rolled out progressively over the past two years". Wego expanded the direct booking feature to Pakistan in 2025.

In 2021, Wego launched ShopCash, an online shopping cashback rewards and deal discovery app for the MENA Market. In a strategic move to expand its reach into business travel and expense management, Wego acquired Travelstop, a platform that simplifies business travel and expense management for companies globally, in October 2023.

In May 2026, Wego introduced cryptocurrency and stablecoin payment options through a partnership with Triple-A.. The following month, Wego announced partnership with the Saudi Arabia’s Ministry of Hajj and Umrah to facilitate Umrah visa submission and related services on Wego's platform, becoming one of the first platforms globally to offer digital Umrah solutions.

== Market activity ==
Wego's core markets are in the MENA and INSUB. Wego has been identified as the top travel app in the MENA region for flight search and booking. Wego partners up with various smartphone manufacturers (Samsung being a prime example) to have their app come preinstalled. Wego also inked a partnership with Huawei’s Petal Search, an easy-to-use application and search engine pre-installed on Huawei smartphones.

Each month Wego sends flight and hotel booking referrals worth US$2B to its travel partners. In addition to partnerships with hotels, airlines and OTAs, Wego continuously collaborates with tourism boards of various countries, such as Great Britain, Japan, Czech Republic, Thailand, Singapore, South Korea, Jordan, Macao and many others, to increase travel demands to and from said countries.
