= 1733 Commercial Space =

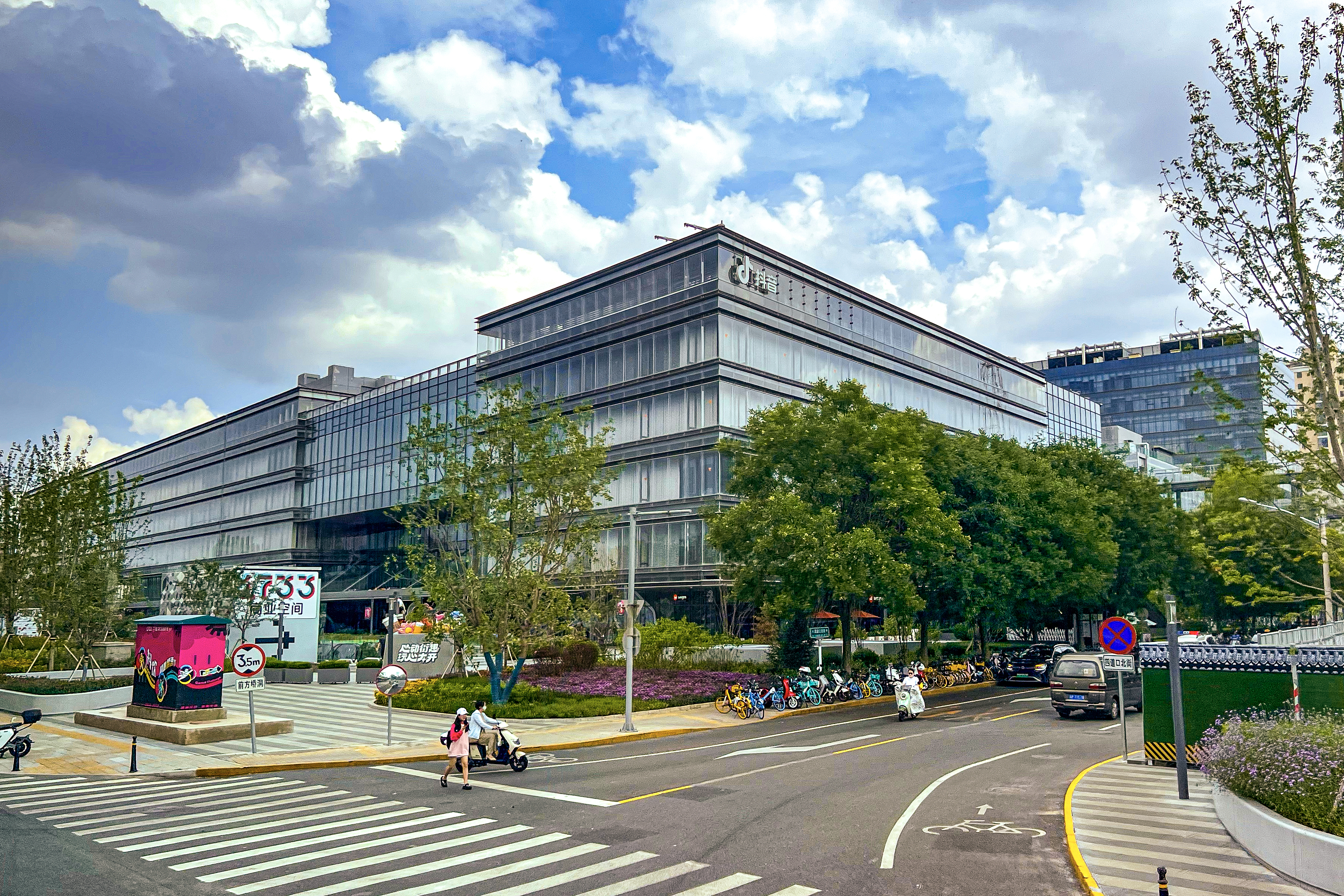
- Location: No. 18, North Third Ring Road West, Haidian District, Beijing, China
- Developer: ByteDance
- Manager: ByteDance
- Owner: ByteDance
- Floor area: 38,000 square meters

1733, also known as 1733 Commercial Space(Chinese: 1733商业空间). It is the headquarters of ByteDance. It is also a workplace and shopping center owned by ByteDance in Beijing, China. It was launched on December 29, 2023. The location of 1733 is in the west direction of Dazhongsi station on Beijing Subway Line 13.

This commercial uses "1733" for its own name, because it means Big Bell Temple was built in 1733, and it also means the Chinese pinyin homophone as "Let's go for a walk together".（Chinese means "一起散散", Chinese pinyin as "yī qī sān sān", same as the Chinese pronunciation of 1733.).

== History ==
This commercial place previously belonged to Zhongkun Life Plaza, it is established in 2004 beside the Big Bell Temple. It is called "The last city comprehensive space into 3rd Ring Rd" and plans to launch rent in 2007. But until 2011, the space project was still.

In 2013, Zhongkun Group announced that it would convert the ZhongKun Life Plaza into an office building. But this project was stopped because the renter opposed them.

In 2019, to solve the messy problem of Zhongkun Plaza, the Haidian district government assisted Bytedance in buying Zhongkun Plaza. Some ByteDance workers thought that this charge would solve the problem of workplace inconvenience in ByteDance Ltd. With the assistance of the Haidian Government, ZhongKun Plaza(1733)is also listed as the Beijing-Zhangjiakou Railway site repair project.

In 2020, Zhongkun Plaza stopped operating and started repairs.

In 2023, ByteDance working teams settled in Plaza and started working there.

On December 29, 2023, 1733 Commercial Space was launched for the public. The main service target is young people. Douyin Life service official account on Douyin was live for the 1733 commercial space opening ceremony on that day.

== Layout ==
This Plaza has several, including ByteDance's workplace and commercial space. Commercial Space is opening for the public. The buildings B1-B2 floors are half outside, half inside a commercial area, and floor B3 is a parking lot. Floor 1 is the ground shop area and ByteDance workplace entrance for ByteDance staff.

Floor B2 Also provide the entrance of Beijing Subway Dazhongsi Station(only serves for Line 12, and it does not connect to Line 13).
