= CapCut =

Video editing software

- Other names: JianYing; ViaMaker (formerly)
- Developer: ByteDance
- Release: May 2019; 7 years ago
Stable release
- macOS: 9.3.0 / August 19, 2026; 2 months ago
- Android: 19.1.0 / August 21, 2026; 2 months ago
- HarmonyOS NEXT: 19.1.0 / August 20, 2026; 2 months ago
- Operating system: iOS iPadOS macOS 14 and later Android 5.0 and later Microsoft Windows; HarmonyOS NEXT
- Platform: iOS, iPadOS, macOS, Android, Web, HarmonyOS, and Microsoft Windows
- Size: iOS: 419.5 MB HarmonyOS NEXT: 147.8 MB
- Available in: 24 languages
- List of languages: Arabic; Simplified Chinese; Traditional Chinese; English; Filipino; French; German; Hebrew; Indonesian; Italian; Japanese; Korean; Malay; Polish; Portuguese; Romanian; Russian; Spanish; Swedish; Thai; Turkish; Ukrainian; Urdu; Vietnamese
- Type: Video editing software and Mobile app
- License: Freemium
- Website: capcut.com

CapCut, known domestically as JianYing (Chinese: 剪映; pinyin: Jiǎnyìng) and formerly internationally as ViaMaker, is a video editor developed by ByteDance, available as a mobile app, desktop app, and web app.

== History ==
The app was first released in China in 2019 and was initially available for iPhone and Android. In 2020, it was rebranded in English from ViaMaker to CapCut and became available globally. It later expanded to include web and desktop versions for Mac and Windows.

In 2022, CapCut reached 200 million active users. According to The Wall Street Journal, in March 2023, it was the second-most downloaded app in the U.S., behind that of Chinese discount retailer Temu. In January 2025, CapCut had over 1 billion downloads on the Google Play Store.

On February 1, 2021, CapCut Pro for Windows was launched. On November 27, the Pro version for Mac was launched. In July 2025, CapCut Pro for HarmonyOS was available on HarmonyOS NEXT tablets.

In July 2024, CapCut was reported by the South China Morning Post to be a generative AI application that led global AI app downloads, with approximately 38.42 million downloads and 323 million monthly active users.

== Features ==
CapCut supports basic video editing functions, including editing, trimming, and adding or splitting clips. Editing projects is limited to single-layer editing, but the app supports overlay options that enable additional effects, including multi-layer editing.

The app includes a library of pre-made templates and a tool that generates editable video captions.

CapCut templates provide a predefined arrangement of effects, transitions, audio timing and media placeholders, allowing users to apply the existing edit to their own photographs or video clips.

It also provides photo editing tools, including retouch and product photo features integrated within the editing interface. CapCut's video editor includes AI-based features such as video and script generation.

Users can export or save completed projects directly to different social media platforms. CapCut includes a free version and a paid Pro version with cloud storage and advanced features.

== Controversies ==
=== Illegal data collection ===
In July 2023, many users of CapCut accused it of illegally profiting off their personal data. A class-action lawsuit filed in the U.S. District Court for the Northern District of Illinois on July 28, 2023, alleged that CapCut illegally harvests and profits from user data including biometric information and geolocation without consent. In September 2025, a federal court excluded most of the lawsuit, which alleged that TikTok's parent company improperly scraped private data from CapCut's video editing software, as lacking grounds, with some of the class action continuing to move forward.

== Bans and restrictions ==
=== Ban in India ===
As a response to border clashes with China in May 2020, the Indian government banned around 56 Chinese applications including CapCut and TikTok, which is owned by CapCut's parent company ByteDance. Indian users were unable to use and download the application. As of February 2022, around 273 Chinese applications have been banned by the Indian government under the concern of national security and Indian user privacy.

=== Ban in the United States ===
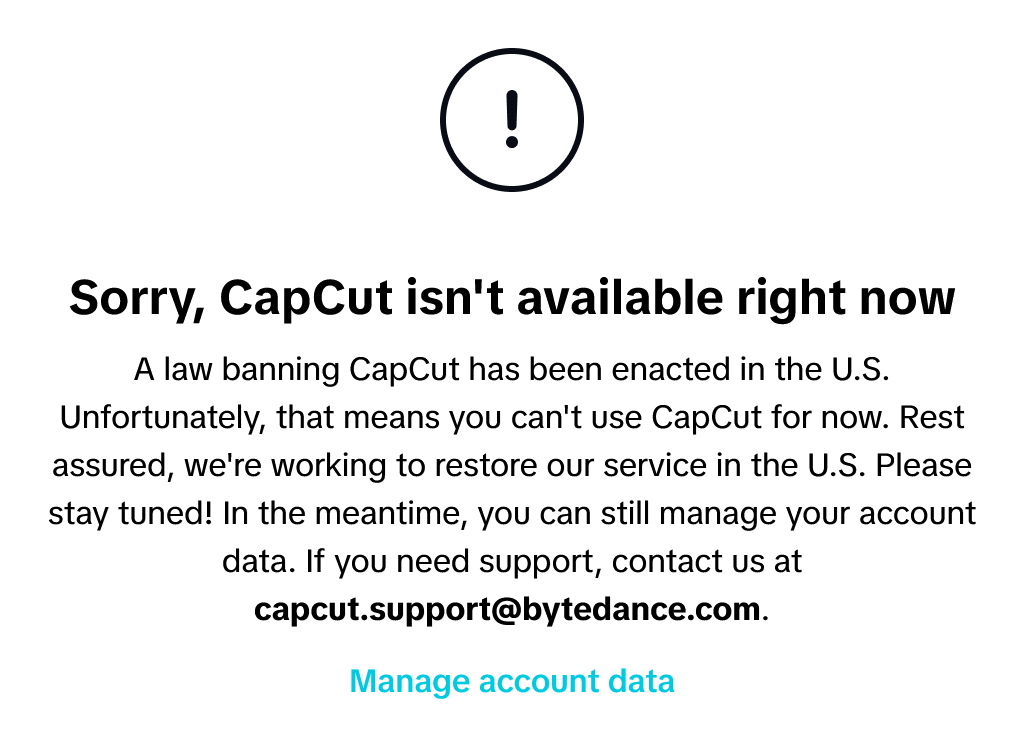
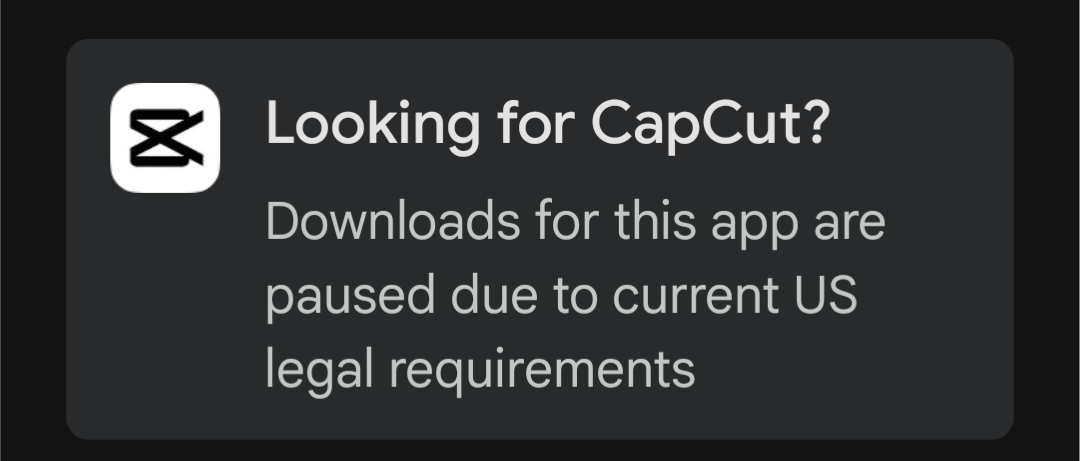
Messages displayed to US users who attempted to access CapCut through its website (top) and Google Play Store (bottom)

On January 18, 2025, at 10 PM EST, CapCut was banned in the United States along with TikTok and all other ByteDance apps due to the implementation of the Protecting Americans from Foreign Adversary Controlled Applications Act.

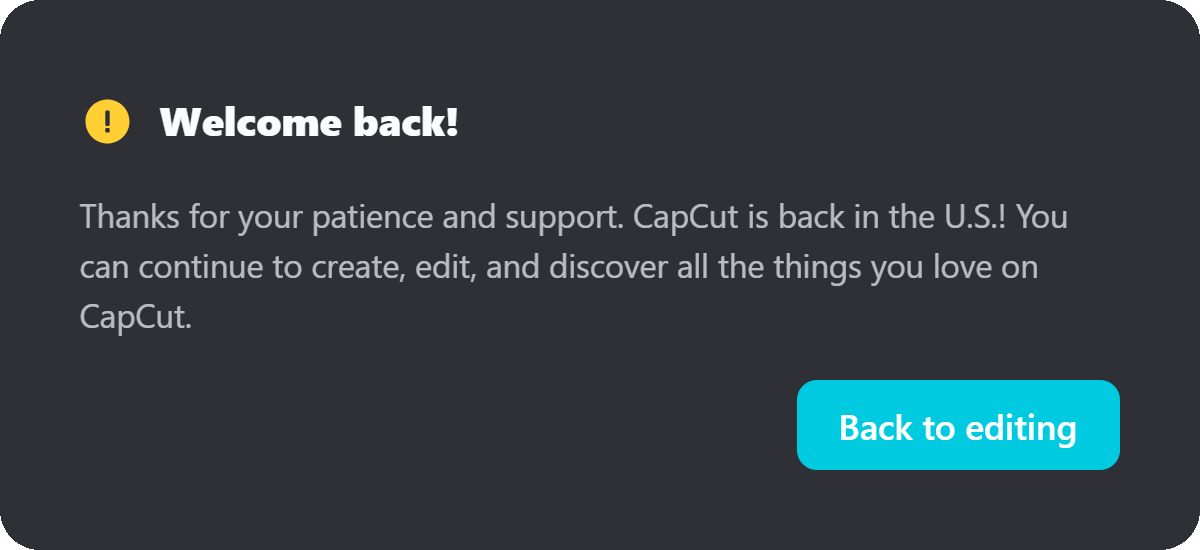
Message displayed to US users on the CapCut website after services resumed on January 20, 2025

Hours after the suspension of services took effect, President Donald Trump indicated on Truth Social that he would issue an executive order on the day of his inauguration "to extend the period of time before the law's prohibitions take effect". On January 21, CapCut began restoring service. On February 13, Google and Apple restored CapCut on the App Store and Google Play Store.

== See also ==
- Comparison of video editing software
- List of video editing software
- Kuaishou
- Bilibili
- Adobe Photoshop
- TikTok
