= Toutiao =

Chinese news and information content platform

- Website logo 2023
- Native name: 今日头条
- Founded: August 2012
- Owner: ByteDance
- Founder: Zhang Yiming
- Services: Information recommendation engine
- Subsidiaries: Dcar (previously)
- Website: www.toutiao.com

Jinri Toutiao
- "Jinri Toutiao" in Simplified (top) and Traditional (bottom) Chinese characters.
- Simplified Chinese: 今日头条
- Traditional Chinese: 今日頭條
- Literal meaning: Today's Headlines
Transcriptions
Standard Mandarin
- Hanyu Pinyin: Jīnrì Tóutiáo
- Bopomofo: ㄐㄧㄣ ㄖˋ ㄊㄡˊ ㄊㄧㄠˊ
- Gwoyeu Romatzyh: Jinryh Tourtyau
- Wade–Giles: Chin^{1}-jih^{4} T'ou^{2}-t'iao^{2}
- IPA: [tɕinɻî] [tʰǒʊtʰjǎʊ]
other Mandarin
- Xiao'erjing: دٍ ژِ ﺗِﻮْ ﺗِﯿَﻮْ
Hakka
- Romanization: Kîm-ngit Thèuthiàu
Yue: Cantonese
- Jyutping: Gāmyaht Tàuhtìuh
Southern Min
- Hokkien POJ: Kin-á-ji̍t Thâutiâu

Toutiao
- Simplified Chinese: 头条
- Traditional Chinese: 頭條
- Literal meaning: Headlines
Transcriptions
Standard Mandarin
- Hanyu Pinyin: Tóutiáo
- Bopomofo: ㄊㄡˊ ㄊㄧㄠˊ
- Gwoyeu Romatzyh: Tourtyau
- Wade–Giles: T'ou^{2}-t'iao^{2}
- IPA: [tʰǒʊtʰjǎʊ]
other Mandarin
- Xiao'erjing: ﺗِﻮْ ﺗِﯿَﻮْ
Hakka
- Romanization: Thèuthiàu
Yue: Cantonese
- Jyutping: Tàuhtìuh
Southern Min
- Hokkien POJ: Thâutiâu

Toutiao (头条, "headlines") or Jinri Toutiao (今日头条, "Today's Headlines") is a Chinese news and information content platform, a core product of the China-based company ByteDance. By analyzing the features of content, users and users' interaction with content, the company's algorithm models generate a tailored feed list of content for each user.

Toutiao is one of China's largest mobile platforms of content creation, aggregation and distribution underpinned by machine learning techniques, with 120 million daily active users as of September 2017. It is also one of China's largest demand-side platforms.

== History ==
In August 2012, Beijing ByteDance Technology Co., Ltd. launched the first version of its main product Toutiao.

The content on Toutiao comes from different sources. At first, a large portion of content was created from the Internet. Now, Toutiao currently has partnerships with over 20,000 traditional media outlets, which make up 10% of its feed, and 800,000 new media content creators.

In 2012 and 2013, Toutiao had two earlier rounds of funding by Susquehanna International Group (SIG) Asia Investment and Yuri Milner.

In 2014, Sequoia Capital led its Series C funding of US$100 million at a valuation of US$500 million, followed by Sina Weibo.

In 2016, Toutiao's number of daily active users reached 78 million.

As of September 2017, Toutiao had 120 million daily active users, and was reported to be valued at US$20 billion. In 2019, publishers were reporting 20%+ of their traffic from Toutiao "Facebook traffic flood receded". 19 December 2019.

In 2018 the State Administration of Press, Publication, Radio, Film, and Television (SAPPRFT) asked Toutiao to increase its moderation and demanded that a particular account that SAPPRFT described as "vulgar" be removed from the service.

In 2021, Toutiao had 150 million daily active users, with an average of 87 minutes per user per day.

== Features ==
=== Algorithm ===
Toutiao uses algorithms to select different content for individual users. It uses machine learning systems for personalized recommendation that surfaces content which users have not necessarily signaled preference for yet.

Using natural language processing and computer vision, Toutiao extracts entities and keywords as features from each piece of content. When a user first opens the app, Toutiao makes a preliminary recommendation. Toutiao then fine-tunes its models with users' interactions with the app.

=== Video ===
Toutiao launched its video channel in May 2015. Creators can upload their short videos, and the algorithm of Toutiao will recommend videos to users.

In 2016, videos on Toutiao are played 1 billion times per day, making Toutiao China's largest short video platform at the time.

=== Q&A ===
In July 2016, Toutiao launched a new channel called Q&A, an open discussion community. Registered users can share their experiences and opinions in specific fields under questions and interact with other users. Toutiao then recommends answers to users in its news feed and Q&A channel.

Toutiao Q&A matches questions with interested users using natural language processing and user profiling, and automatically invites them to answer certain questions.

=== Fake news moderation ===
Toutiao identifies fake news by using a combination of human reviewers along with automated analysis of posts and comments.

== User characteristics and behavior ==
90% of Toutiao users are under 30 years old. The average user spends 76 minutes on the site every day, resulting in 1.3 billion articles read every day.

== Creator community ==
In 2013, Toutiao provided a self-publishing platform to media organizations. The platform later evolved into Toutiaohao Account.

As of 2016, more than 350,000 individuals and organizations have started their Toutiaohao Accounts, including administration departments, media organizations, companies and individual writers. They publish 150,000 articles and videos on Toutiao every day.

== Social good ==
=== Toutiao Alert for Missing Persons ===
Using location-based notification-pushing techniques, Toutiao initiated a corporate social responsibility project called "Toutiao Alert for Missing Persons". People can send detailed information of the missing person, including their last known location and time. After a verification process, Toutiao will push notification messages of missing persons to its users within the possible range of their whereabouts.

As of 2016, 700 missing persons have been recovered as a result of Toutiao's users offering clues and notifying authority.

As of February 2017, over 1000 missing individuals have been found using this feature.

== Research ==
Toutiao's research arm, Toutiao AI Lab, was founded in March 2016 and is headed by Ma Wei-Ying. Its main research areas include Natural Language Processing, Machine Learning, Computer Vision and Human-Computer Interaction.

Xiaomingbot, an AI-powered robot writer co-developed by Toutiao Lab and Peking University, creates articles automatically. It published 450 articles over the course of the 2016 Summer Olympics.

== Investment and globalization ==
In its domestic market, Toutiao has made an investment to Imaginechina.

Toutiao has entered Japan, the US, Brazil and the Southeast Asian region.

In October 2016, Toutiao gave India's local-language app Dailyhunt 25 million dollars in its series D funding round.

Toutiao obtained a controlling stake of the Indonesian local-language news app Babe in 2016.

Toutiao's parent company, Bytedance owns TopBuzz in the US and Brazil.

In January 2017, Toutiao acquired the video creation app Flipagram for an undisclosed amount.

After Toutiao's series D financing round at the end of 2016, with investments worth US$1 billion by Sequoia Capital, CCB International and other institutions, Toutiao is reported to be valued at more than 11 billion US dollars.

== Controversies ==
=== Legality of contents ===
On June 5, 2014, Guangzhou Daily sued Toutiao for violating its copyright. The case was settled 13 days later.

On September 16, 2014, the National Copyright Administration affirmed that Toutiao had violated the copyright of traditional media outlets by crawling and serving contents from its own servers; however, the administration also noted that Toutiao has already deleted the relevant contents and started negotiating for a formal license.

On December 29, 2017, the Cyberspace Administration of China accused Toutiao and Phoenix News of "disseminating pornographic and vulgar information, had serious issues of misguiding people, and had an evil influence on the ecosystem of online public discourse", listing "reposting news in violation of regulation, clickbait, and seriously disrupting the order of information flow on the network" as its main offense. In response, Toutiao halted its content update for six of its channels for 24 hours, shut down its "Society" channel, banned thousands of accounts, and started recruiting 2000 more censors.

=== Privacy ===
Toutiao has a feature called "people you might know". In December 2017, users noticed that the feature consistently showed them their contacts, despite not giving permission to either Toutiao or WeChat to read them. When questioned, Toutiao states that it "does not possess, collect or process users' private data", and "reading users' contacts with their consent is a common practice in mobile Internet business". On January 11, 2018, the Ministry of Industry and Information Technology asked Toutiao to "abide by the laws and regulations, and only collect necessary personal information legally in a justified manner".

=== Fraudulent advertisements ===
On March 29, 2018, CCTV-2 reported that Toutiao showed advertisements violating the Advertising Law for dubious or counterfeit products, targeting cities where regulations aren't as tight. One company, Tong Ren Tang was forced to delist its genuine products by the CFDA on December 29, 2017, due to the complaints filed by those who bought the advertised counterfeits. Tong Ren Tang stated that they have never advertised on Toutiao, and have filed complaints against such illegal advertisements with Toutiao before, however in some cases Toutiao rejected their complaints, instead responding "Why don't you advertise? If you advertise your genuine products, there won't be any counterfeits," and when requested for the identities of the advertisers, Toutiao responded "you as a company have no rights to know that".

During an interview, employees of Toutiao says that as long as one's willing to pay more advertising fee, they don't care if the product is good or not, and if the product is not certified, they'll fake one, and they'll help set up a landing page with legal content which will guide the visitor to the illegal advertisement, and find a proxy company so that when the regulators find out, they can blame the proxy.

Toutiao responded on March 30 saying that the relevant advertisers and proxies have been banned from Toutiao indefinitely, and the employees have been fired. Toutiao says it will soon implement a warning when users are navigating away from contents controlled by Toutiao.

== See also ==
- Xigua Video (formerly Toutiao Video), Toutiao's online video platform
- Artificial intelligence
- Recommender system
- Machine learning
- Algorithm
