= RESTRICT Act =

Proposed US legislation

- Other short titles: Restricting the Emergence of Security Threats that Risk Information and Communications Technology Act of 2023
- Long title: To authorize the Secretary of Commerce to review and prohibit certain transactions between persons in the United States and foreign adversaries, and for other purposes.
- Announced in: the 118th United States Congress
- Sponsored by: Mark Warner (D–VA)
- Number of co-sponsors: 25

Codification
- Agencies affected: United States Department of Commerce

Legislative history
- Introduced in the Senate as S. 686 by Mark Warner (D–VA) on March 7, 2023

The RESTRICT Act (S. 686) was a proposed law that was first introduced in the United States Senate on March 7, 2023. Introduced by Senator Mark Warner, the Act proposed that the Secretary of Commerce be given the power to review business transactions involving certain information and communications technologies products or services when they are connected to a "foreign adversary" of the United States, and pose an "undue and unacceptable risk" to the national security of the United States or its citizens.

The RESTRICT Act was one of multiple proposed bills that would restrict or prohibit the Chinese-owned video sharing service TikTok from conducting business in the United States. In March 2024, the House passed a similar bill called the Protecting Americans from Foreign Adversary Controlled Applications Act (PAFACA), which was signed into law in April 2024.

The RESTRICT Act was broader in scope than PAFACA, and did not receive as much support.

== Overview ==
The RESTRICT Act is described as "a systematic framework for addressing technology-based threats to the security and safety of Americans." It grants the Secretary of Commerce the authority to review transactions by certain foreign entities who offer "information and communications technologies products or services" (ICTS), in order to identify, investigate, and mitigate "undue and unacceptable" risks to the national security of the United States or its citizens. This includes but is not limited to:

- Impact to the country's critical infrastructure and digital economy,
- "Sabotage or subversion" of ICTS in the United States
- Interference and manipulation of federal elections
- Undermining the democratic process to "steer policy and regulatory decisions in favor of the strategic objectives of a foreign adversary to the detriment of the national security of the United States".

The Act applies to ICTS entities that are held in whole or in part by, or otherwise fall under the jurisdiction of a country or government that is designated under the Act as a "foreign adversary" of the United States, and has more than one million active users or units sold in the United States. The initial text of the Act classifies China (including Hong Kong and Macau), Cuba, Iran, North Korea, Russia, and the Nicolás Maduro regime of Venezuela as foreign adversaries.

It would be unlawful for any person to violate any order or mitigation measure issued under the RESTRICT Act, with civil penalties of up to $250,000 or twice the value of the transaction that served as the basis of the order, whichever is greater, and criminal penalties of up to $1 million and up to 20 years imprisonment.

== Reception ==
While the service was not mentioned by name by the bill or its sponsors, the RESTRICT Act was characterized as a means to potentially restrict or prohibit the Chinese-owned video sharing service TikTok from conducting business in the United States.

The bill has faced bipartisan criticism for having a lack of judicial oversight and transparency in its enforcement mechanisms, and for containing wording broad and vague enough to potentially cover end-users (such as, for example, potentially criminalizing use of a VPN service or sideloading to access services blocked from doing business in the United States under the Act, due to the text stating that no person may "cause or aid, abet, counsel, command, induce, procure, permit, or approve the doing of any act" that violates orders issued under the Act). Many individuals have compared the bill to the Patriot Act.

The American Civil Liberties Union (ACLU) expressed their opposition, arguing that the blocking of entire services violates the First Amendment rights of citizens. In regards to its implied target, Congressman Jamaal Bowman and the Electronic Frontier Foundation (EFF) believed that the federal government should prioritize internet privacy legislation that also applies to U.S.-based companies.

Republican U.S. Senators JD Vance, Josh Hawley, and Rand Paul have all expressed their opposition, with Paul considering it contradictory for Republicans to advocate "censor[ing] social media apps that they worry are influenced by the Chinese" while at the same time being opposed to censorship. Vance and Hawley both noted that while they support a ban on TikTok, they felt the RESTRICT Act possessed too many negative implications. Several Democratic officeholders, including Representative Alexandria Ocasio-Cortez, also criticized the legislation, with Ocasio-Cortez believing that it was being rushed, and citing that Congress had never received any classified national security briefings related to TikTok. Libertarian groups including the Mises Caucus and Reason Foundation condemned the bill, with the former arguing that it "gives the government authority over all forms of communication domestic or abroad."

Warner's office stated that the bill was intended to target corporate entities "engaged in 'sabotage or subversion' of communications technology in the U.S." (such as causing harm to "critical infrastructure" or tampering with federal elections), and not target end-users necessarily, despite such wording not having been used in the bill itself, and has not commented on complaints about possible uses beyond the bill's stated intent.

In July 2023, it was reported that TikTok parent company ByteDance had spent $100 million on lobbying against the proposed bill, with Warner stating that lawmakers were preparing amendments to clarify the scope of the bill.

In March 2024, the House passed the Protecting Americans from Foreign Adversary Controlled Applications Act. It accomplishes similar goals to the RESTRICT Act by allowing the government to order the divestment of social media applications owned by or under the jurisdiction of foreign adversaries, or else it would become unlawful for the app to be distributed or maintained in the United States. The bill explicitly names ByteDance Ltd. and its subsidiaries, including TikTok. To expedite its passage in the Senate, a modified version of the bill was incorporated into a foreign aid package. This package was passed by the House and Senate in April 2024.

== See also ==
- Donald Trump–TikTok controversy
- Restrictions on TikTok in the United States
- TikTok v. Trump
