= Censorship of TikTok =

TikTok available on all devices; TikTok banned on national governmental devices; TikTok previously banned for all users; TikTok discontinued for download; TikTok banned for all users de jure, but not enforced; TikTok banned for all users de facto; TikTok banned for all users on all devices both government and civilian; TikTok banned; Douyin used instead; Not shown: Banned on EU and NATO devices

While TikTok remains accessible to civilians in most countries and regions, a minority — including mainland China, Hong Kong, India, Iran, North Korea, and Afghanistan — have imposed nationwide bans. In the United States, legislation providing for a full ban was enacted but not implemented because of a restructure of U.S. operations. Many countries restrict TikTok on government-issued devices due to national security concerns over potential access to data by the Chinese government through TikTok's parent company, ByteDance. Reasoning for full bans have cited children's well-being and offensive content such as pornography.

== Asia ==
=== China ===
Despite being a Chinese-made app, TikTok blocks users in mainland China and Hong Kong via Internet geolocation and country codes of SIM cards. Instead, the domestic version Douyin is available, presumably to shield Chinese users from politically sensitive content posted by foreign users. The international version can sometimes be accessed by removing mainland China and Hong Kong SIM cards and using a VPN service or data roaming with an overseas SIM card. In 2026, police in Hubei Province, China have announced that a man was warned and fined for “unauthorized use” of a Honor phone at home to connect to a VPN, browsing the foreign TikTok app.

==== Hong Kong ====
ByteDance halted TikTok's operations in Hong Kong a week after the 2020 Hong Kong national security law took effect. ByteDance China CEO Kelly Zhang announced that Douyin, the mainland China version of TikTok, will continue to serve users in Hong Kong. Since 2021, Douyin became available on Hong Kong Apple App Store.

=== Taiwan ===
TikTok is available in Taiwan. Taiwan, which is facing off with China over the Strait of Taiwan, banned TikTok from government devices in December 2022, and is considering extending it to the private sector over concerns of usage by the Chinese government to conduct "cognitive warfare" against Taiwan.

=== Afghanistan ===
In April 2022, a spokesman for the Taliban government stated that the app will be banned for 'misleading the younger generation' and that TikTok's content was 'not consistent with Islamic laws'.

=== Armenia ===
In October 2020, TikTok users in Armenia reported a loss of app functionality, although it has not been confirmed whether this was the result of any intervention by the Armenian government in response to the use of the app by Azerbaijani sources to spread misinformation during the Second Nagorno-Karabakh War.

=== Azerbaijan ===
On 27 September 2020, citizens of Azerbaijan noticed social media restrictions across an array of platforms, including TikTok, Facebook, Twitter, LinkedIn, YouTube, and others. NetBlocks confirmed the restrictions on social media and communication platforms through Twitter. According to Azerbaijan's Ministry of Transport, Communications and Technology, these restrictions were issued in an attempt to "prevent large-scale provocations from Armenia," during the longstanding Nagorno-Karabakh conflict.

On 19 September 2023, Azerbaijan temporarily restricted access to TikTok again for six weeks, due to the 2023 Nagorno-Karabakh clashes.

Azerbaijan blocked TikTok again along with Instagram and X on 13 October 2026 over growing protests over hijab rules. This was confirmed by NetBlocks and Surfshark.

=== Bangladesh ===
In November 2018, the Bangladeshi government blocked the TikTok app's Internet access as part of Bangladesh's crackdown on pornography and gambling sites. "I want to create a safe and secure internet for all Bangladeshis, including children. And this is my war against pornography. And this will be a continuous war," said Mustafa Jabbar, Posts and Communications Officer of Bangladesh.

In August 2020, the government of Bangladesh requested that TikTok remove 10 videos from the platform that were uploaded from the country. "The TikTok authorities have told the government they will take down 'offensive' videos uploaded from Bangladesh," said the Minister of Post and Telecommunication of Bangladesh. As a result, the Bangladeshi government cleared the TikTok ban.

In June 2021, Law and Life Foundation, a human rights organization, issued a legal notice to the Bangladeshi government that sought the prohibition of "dangerous and harmful" applications such as TikTok, PUBG, and Free Fire, but failed to obtain a response. Soon thereafter, Law and Life Foundation's lawyers filed a petition with the High Court, sharing the organization's concerns. In August 2020, the High Court encouraged the Bangladeshi government to prohibit "dangerous and harmful" applications such as TikTok, PUBG, and Free Fire to "save children and adolescents from moral and social degradation."

On 2 August 2024, TikTok, along with WhatsApp, Instagram and YouTube was blocked in Bangladesh due to quota reform protests.

=== India ===
==== 2019 ban ====
On April 3, 2019, the Madras High Court, while hearing a PIL, asked the government of India to ban the app, citing that it "encourages pornography" and shows "inappropriate content". The court also noted that minors using the app were at risk of being targeted by sexual predators. The court further asked broadcast media not to telecast any of those videos from the app. The spokesperson for TikTok stated that they were abiding by local laws and were awaiting a copy of the court order before they take action. On 17 April, both Google and Apple blocked TikTok from Google Play and the App Store for users in India. As the court refused to reconsider the ban, the company stated that they had removed over 6 million videos that violated their content policy and guidelines.

On 25 April 2019, the ban was lifted after the Madras High Court reversed its order, following a plea from TikTok developer ByteDance Technology. "We are committed to continuously enhancing our safety features as a testament to our ongoing commitment to our users in India," said TikTok in an official media statement. India's TikTok ban might have cost the app 15 million new users.

==== 2020 ban ====
TikTok, along with 58 other Chinese-created apps, was banned completely in India by the Ministry of Electronics and Information Technology on 29 June 2020, with a statement saying they were "prejudicial to the sovereignty and integrity of India, defence of India, security of the state, and public order". The ban was in response to the Galwan Valley military clash between Indian and Chinese troops in disputed territory along their shared border between Ladakh and Western China. After an earlier skirmish in 2017 between the militaries of the two most populous countries in the world, the Indian military demanded that its troops delete dozens of Chinese applications from their devices over national security concerns. Applications like Weibo, UC Browser, and SHAREit are among the apps that were removed at that time and have now been completely banned.

The Indian government said the decision to ban the apps was "to protect the data and privacy of its 1.3 billion citizens" and to put a stop to technology that was "stealing and surreptitiously transmitting users' data in an unauthorised manner and to unknown servers outside India".

Apar Gupta, executive director of the Internet Freedom Foundation, said the censorship was absent from well-defined national security criteria and has "impacted more Indians than any before". A venture capital investor said it was a populist "feel-good" step, referring to the ban, and that the world has the right to do what China has long done in its own country.

=== Indonesia ===
On 3 July 2018, TikTok was temporarily banned in Indonesia after the government accused it of promulgating "pornography, inappropriate content, and blasphemy." Rudiantara, Indonesia's Minister of Communications and Information said, "The app has a lot of negative and harmful content, especially for children," and added that, "once TikTok can give us guarantees they can maintain clean content, it can re-open." TikTok quickly responded by promising to enlist 20 staff to censor TikTok content in Indonesia, and the ban was lifted eight days later.

=== Iran ===
Iranians cannot access TikTok because of Iranian censorship.

=== Jordan ===
On 17 December 2022, Jordan announced a temporary ban against TikTok, following the death of a police officer during clashes with protesters. On 23 December, local media outlets in Jordan reported that the platform was back to normal, following its six-day suspension. In May 2023, it was reported that the app was still banned, with anonymous government sources saying the company had still not complied with all of its requirements.

=== Kyrgyzstan ===
Authorities banned the use of TikTok in August 2023, citing concerns about children's development. It was unbanned a few days later.

=== Nepal ===
On 13 November 2023, the government of Nepal said that it was banning TikTok. The main reason for the ban in was reported to be social harmony being disturbed by "misuse" of the video app and that there was rising demand to control it. The ban was lifted in August 2024 following an agreement between TikTok and the Government of Nepal to help identify criminal misuse of the app.

=== North Korea ===
TikTok is blocked in North Korea and cannot be accessed there because of the country's censorship.

=== Pakistan ===
Over the 15 months up to November 2021, the Pakistan Telecommunication Authority (PTA) imposed and lifted four bans on TikTok.

In October 2020, Pakistan ordered a ban of TikTok over "immoral, obscene, and vulgar" content. The ban was reversed ten days later, after ByteDance stated that they would remove objectionable TikTok content and block users who upload "pornography and paedo content".

In March 2021, a provincial court, the Peshawar High Court Order responded to a petition made by a resident of Punjab. The petition stated that TikTok's platform was being used to promote crime and glorified the use of drugs and weapons in its short videos and called on the PTA to ban the app once again. According to Sara Ali Khan, legal representative of the Punjab resident, the PTA announced that TikTok had not adequately proven their ability to moderate "immoral" and "indecent" content. Even with the removal of over 6 million videos between January 2021 and March 2021, the PTA remained unsatisfied and banned the app outright. The PTA lifted the ban in April 2021 after TikTok assured them it would "filter and moderate content".

On 28 June 2021, the Sindh High Court Order urged the PTA to restore the ban on TikTok for the alleged "spreading of immorality and obscenity". On 30 June 2021, the PTA announced that it had once more blocked citizen's access to the video-sharing application. Three days later, the court withdrew its decision.

On 20 July 2021, the PTA instituted a ban on TikTok by reason of the "continuous presence of inappropriate content on the platform and its failure to take such content down." According to a statement by the PTA, "As a result of continuous engagement, senior management of the platform assured (the) PTA of its commitment to take necessary measure to control unlawful content in accordance with local laws and societal norms." Consequently, on 19 November 2021, the PTA agreed to act promptly and once again backtracked and eliminated Pakistan's fourth ban on TikTok. The PTA said in a tweet that they "will continue to monitor the platform in order to ensure that unlawful content contrary to Pakistan's law and societal values is not disseminated."

=== Philippines ===
A bill banning TikTok has been filed in the House of Representatives of the Philippines. In May 2024, Manila 6th District Rep. Bienvenido Abante filed House Bill 10489 proposing the ban of TikTok and other "foreign adversary-controlled" social platforms. The Department of Information and Communications Technology however has preferred regulation and monitoring over outright ban of TikTok and other similar apps.

The Armed Forces of the Philippines has also ordered its personnel to avoid using TikTok in both personal and government-issued devices over concerns of espionage by China. The order was publicized in February 2024 but has been in effect "for a long time" already.

=== Vietnam ===
In Vietnam, the censorship of TikTok has become a complex and controversial issue. The Vietnamese government has imposed numerous regulations and restrictions on content allowed on the platform, particularly content related to politics and issues that could affect national security. Some users have reported that videos related to protests or sensitive issues have been removed or restricted. This has led to backlash from the online community, with many arguing that this censorship violates freedom of speech and user rights.

=== Uzbekistan ===
On 2 July 2021, TikTok was included by Uzkomnazorat in the register of violators of the law on personal data and access to it from Uzbek IP addresses became impossible.

== Africa ==
=== Gabon ===
In February 2026, TikTok, along with other social media apps were banned throughout the country of Gabon.

=== Kenya ===
In April 2024, an individual filed a petition to ban TikTok in Kenya. However, the petition is about unregulated content on the platform, not the government's indirect suppression of online criticism.

=== Senegal ===
In August 2023, Senegal blocked TikTok following the arrest of opposition leader Ousmane Sonko. In October, the country said it wants to sign a comprehensive regulatory agreement with the platform before lifting its ban.

=== Somalia ===
On 21 August 2023, Somalia's communications ministry announced a ban on TikTok (along with Telegram and 1xBet) citing the spread of propaganda and indecent content, but the call has not been enforced.

== Europe ==
In February 2023, the European Commission and the European Council banned TikTok from official devices. French President Emmanuel Macron has called the app "deceptively innocent" and reportedly spoke of his desire to regulate the app, when visiting the United States in November 2022.

On 31 March 2023, the North Atlantic Treaty Organization announced the ban of TikTok on all NATO-issued devices citing security concerns.

=== Albania ===
On 21 December 2024, Albanian Prime Minister Edi Rama announced that TikTok would be banned in Albania for at least one year, starting from the beginning of 2025. Rama cited the death of a teenager in a brawl linked to a conflict on TikTok and concerns over social media promoting youth violence. Alongside this ban, the Albanian government plans to initiate educational programs for students and parents.

On 13 March 2025, the Electronic and Postal Communications Authority (AKEP) and the National Cybersecurity Authority (AKSK), per the decisions released by the Albanian government, instructed all internet service providers in Albania to block TikTok's IPs, DNS resolution, and Server Name Indications, as well as ByteDance's IP addresses.

In June 2025, the ban is no longer enforced after many users reportedly use TikTok without restrictions or VPN, but the official ban is still in force.

=== Austria ===
In May 2023, following advice from Austria's intelligence services and several ministry experts, the Austrian federal government decided to ban the private use and installation of TikTok on work devices of federal employees.

=== Belgium ===
In March 2023, Belgium banned TikTok from all federal government work devices over cybersecurity, privacy, and misinformation concerns.

=== Czech Republic ===
In March 2023, the Czech National Cyber and Information Security Agency (NÚKIB) issued a warning against TikTok, citing cybersecurity, privacy, and potential influence risks as threats to critical infrastructure and public institutions.

=== Denmark ===
In March 2023, Denmark's Ministry of Defence banned TikTok on work devices.

=== Estonia ===
On 29 March 2023, the Minister of Entrepreneurship and Information Technology Kristjan Järvan has announced that the use and installation of the TikTok app will be banned on smartphones issued by the state to officials. In an interview with the daily Eesti Päevaleht, Järvan stated that the app will be removed from centrally managed smartphones and its installation will be prohibited from this month onwards.

=== France ===
In 2022, French President Emmanuel Macron accused TikTok of censoring content and promoting online addiction among young people.

In March 2023, France banned all "recreational applications", including TikTok and other apps such as Twitter, Instagram, and Netflix, or games such as Candy Crush on government employees' phones due to concerns relating to insufficient data security measures. Derogations for communications purpose can be authorised.

During the 2024 New Caledonia unrest, the government issued a ban on TikTok.

=== Ireland ===
On 21 April 2023, the National Cyber Security Centre issued an updated advice that TikTok should not be installed or used on official public sector devices.

=== Latvia ===
In March 2023, the Latvian Ministry of Foreign Affairs banned TikTok on work devices, citing security reasons.

=== Malta ===
The Malta Information Technology Agency (MITA) blocked the TikTok app on all government devices unless users have a ‘Standards Plus’ internet package.

=== Netherlands ===
In November 2022, the Dutch Ministry of General Affairs advised government personnel to "suspend the use of TikTok for the government until TikTok has adjusted its data protection policy." In March 2023, the government ordered officials to delete the app from their work phones.

=== Norway ===
In March 2023, following advice from the National Security Authority, Prime Minister Jonas Gahr Støre banned TikTok from the work phones and tablets used by ministers, state secretaries, and political advisors.

=== Poland ===
In March 2023, the Polish Council of Digital Affairs issued a recommendation to ban TikTok from government-issued devices. The recommendation has not been enacted into the politicians' work devices usage policy, citing "insufficient evidence" over collecting excess personal data by TikTok as a reason.

=== Romania ===
In November 2024, Romania's telecommunications regulator called for TikTok to be suspended amid allegations of interference in the 2024 Romanian presidential election.

=== Russia ===
In March 2022, Russia criminalized spreading "misinformation" against its invasion of Ukraine. TikTok then banned any new uploads and only allowed old videos that were uploaded within Russia.

TikTok has weathered Russia intelligence crackdown by controlling and cutting off Russian users from the outside world, while also allowing national propaganda.

=== United Kingdom ===
In March 2023, the UK government announced that TikTok would be banned on electronic devices used by ministers and other employees, amid security concerns relating to the app's handling of user data. The same month, the BBC told all employees to delete TikTok from their devices unless the app was being used for work purposes.

On 4 March 2025, the Information Commissioner's Office began an investigation into TikTok, Reddit, and Imgur for using different algorithms that engage users with content potentially diverting children's attention. The ICO is concerned about these platforms promoting inappropriate or harmful content to children. The Online Safety Act 2023 mandated that online platforms such as TikTok prevent children from accessing harmful or age-inappropriate content through age-checking measures and content restrictions.

== North America ==
=== Canada ===
In February 2023, following a review of TikTok from the Chief Information Officer of Canada, the Canadian government banned the app on all government-issued devices. In September 2023, the Canadian federal government commenced a national security review of TikTok under the Investment Canada Act.

Shortly thereafter, all the provincial and territorial governments of Canada banned the app on government-issued devices, including Alberta, British Columbia, Manitoba, New Brunswick, Newfoundland and Labrador, Northwest Territories, Nova Scotia, Nunavut, Ontario, Prince Edward Island, Quebec, Saskatchewan, and Yukon.

In November 2024, following a national security review, the Canadian government ordered TikTok to dissolve its operations in Canada. TikTok stated that it would challenge the government's decision in court.

=== United States ===
U.S. Supreme Court ruling on TikTok v. Garland

==== Ban from government devices ====
TikTok has been banned on devices owned by the federal government. It has also been banned in all 50 states on devices issued by state governments. Some universities have banned TikTok on campus Wi-Fi and university-owned computers. New York City has banned the app on city-owned devices.

==== Ban from personal devices ====
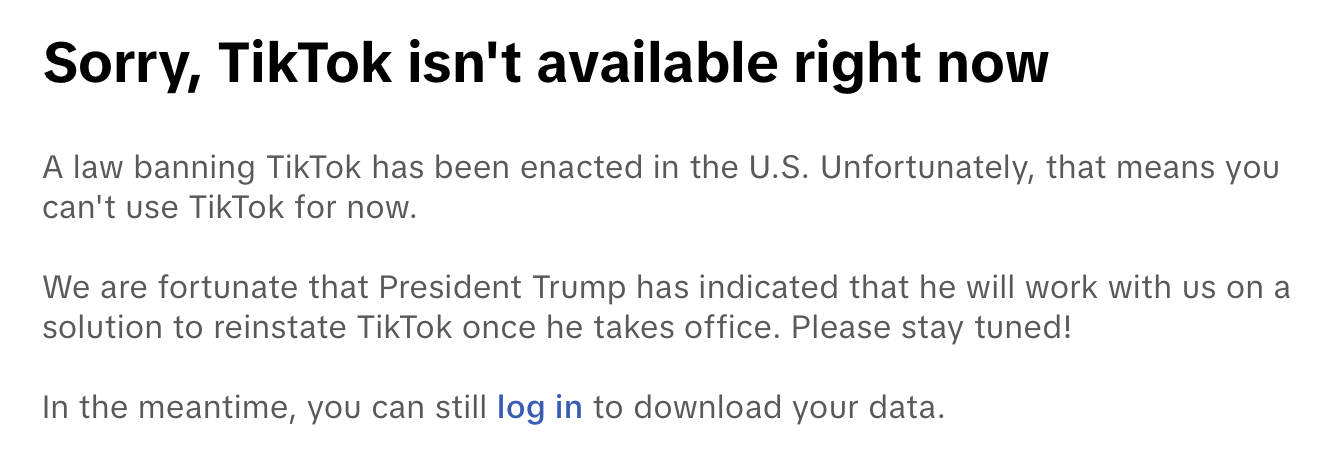
Message displayed to US users via the TikTok website (left) and mobile app (right)

In May 2023, Montana became the first U.S. state to pass a ban that included personal devices, making it illegal for app stores to allow TikTok to be downloaded within Montana starting on 1 January 2024. However, a federal judge blocked the state ban from taking effect in November 2023.

In March 2024, the United States House of Representatives passed the Protecting Americans from Foreign Adversary Controlled Applications Act (PAFACA), which would effectively ban TikTok unless it is divested from ByteDance within 180 days of the bill becoming a law, with U.S. president Joe Biden agreeing to sign it if the bill passed the U.S. Senate. In April, the House of Representatives passed H.R. 8038 (later known as Public Law 118-50), a collection of other bills which packaged together the Protecting Americans from Foreign Adversary Controlled Applications Act with other bills that touched on supporting Ukraine in its war against Russia, fentanyl, and support for Israel and Taiwan. The divestiture period was increased to 270 days with the option to extend it a further 90 days. This bill was then passed by the United States Senate the following week and signed into law by President Joe Biden on 24 April 2024.

ByteDance challenged the federal law, and a legal battle was fought between TikTok users and the US government which the Supreme Court of the United States agreed to hear as TikTok v. Garland on an accelerated timetable, with oral arguments held on 10 January 2025, nine days before the ban. On 17 January 2025, the Supreme Court upheld the constitutionality of PAFACA in a per curiam decision, and on 18 January 2025, TikTok was blocked on all devices in the United States due to the law. This ban has also affected some Canadian users of the app. 12 hours later, TikTok restored services, despite the ban remaining nominally in effect, due to President-elect Donald Trump granting ByteDance 75 more days to divest from TikTok under an executive order, with different millionaires expressing their interest in buying TikTok.

==== Criticism ====
Bans and attempted bans in the United States have drawn objections citing hypocrisy, protectionism, and not addressing user data privacy in general. Critics have labeled a potential ban on the app an assault on freedom of speech. Technology Attorney Star Kashman also critiques the effectiveness of a potential ban, noting that merely "Banning TikTok does not [adequately] address the root issues of national security or data privacy".

== Oceania ==
=== Australia ===
On 7 March 2023, The Canberra Times reported that 68 Australian federal agencies had banned TikTok on work-related mobile devices. Liberal Party Senator James Paterson called for a federal ban on all government-related devices.

Some state governments have considered banning the app on official government devices. On 14 March 2023, New South Wales was the first state to consider a ban on the app, followed by both Western Australia and the Australian Capital Territory three days later. Victoria has also considered a ban on the app on the phones of government workers.

On 21 March 2023, the federal government began a review of the app. The review is expected to ban TikTok on all official government devices. It has been reported that some politicians are using burner phones due to the ban.

On 4 April 2023, TikTok was banned on all government devices, including the mobile phones of politicians.

=== New Caledonia ===
On 16 May 2024, France issued a temporary ban on TikTok in New Caledonia in the wake of protests against changes to the election law. This marks the first time ever that a social network was banned for civilian use on French territory.

=== New Zealand ===
On 17 March 2023, the New Zealand Parliamentary Service banned TikTok on devices connected to Parliament, citing cybersecurity concerns and advice from the Government Communications Security Bureau (GCSB), the country's signals intelligence agency. The GCSB's Minister, Andrew Little, had initially ruled out a ban on TikTok.

== See also ==
- Censorship of social media
- Internet censorship in China
- Censorship in North Korea
