= TikTok v. Trump =

Lawsuit between TikTok and Donald Trump

- Court: United States District Court for the District of Columbia
- Full case name: TikTok, et al. v. Donald J. Trump, et al.

Case history
- Related action: U.S. WeChat Users Alliance v. Trump

Laws applied
- Superseded by
- TikTok v. Garland (2025)
- Abrogated by
- Protecting Americans from Foreign Adversary Controlled Applications Act

TikTok v. Trump was a lawsuit before the United States District Court for the District of Columbia filed in September 2020 by TikTok as a challenge to President Donald Trump's executive order of August 6, 2020. The order prohibited the usage of TikTok in five stages, the first being the prohibition of downloading the application. On September 27, 2020, a preliminary injunction was issued by Judge Carl J. Nichols blocking enforcement of that executive order. The lawsuit, by then captioned TikTok v. Biden, was dismissed in July 2021, following the Biden Administration's rescission of the executive order.

== Background ==
TikTok, a social media networking platform owned by ByteDance and based in Beijing, China, received criticism by the Trump administration about the data it collects and the security threat it allegedly poses. In June 2020, TikTok was criticized for accessing the clipboard content on their users' iOS devices, a feature the company said it had plans to cease. TikTok argued this feature was set up as an "anti-spam" measure but removed the feature regardless. The Trump Administration restricted the use of TikTok within the United States government and military, instructing officials to delete the application from devices owned by the government.

On July 7, 2020, United States Secretary of State Mike Pompeo announced that he was considering a ban on TikTok in the United States. On July 31, Donald Trump told reporters that he would be banning TikTok's operations in the United States, rejecting a potential deal where ByteDance would sell a majority stake in TikTok to an American tech company such as Microsoft. Trump reversed this position a few days later, announcing on August 3 that TikTok had until September 15 to sell a majority of its holdings to a company based in the United States. He stipulated, however, that the United States Department of the Treasury would have to receive a "substantial amount of money" from the deal, attributing TikTok's success to operations in the United States and arguing that TikTok owed the United States government for this success.

On August 6, 2020, Donald Trump issued Executive Order 13942, directing the Secretary of Commerce to prohibit any and all transactions with ByteDance under the International Emergency Economic Powers Act. To invoke the act, Trump also declared a national emergency based on the information TikTok collects. The order gave ByteDance until November 12, 45 days after the issuing of the order, to sell a majority portion of the company to an American company. On November 13, Trump extended the deadline to November 27, and then to December 4.

Back on August 24, 2020, TikTok announced that it was filing suit against Trump and alleged that the ban violated the First Amendment of the United States Constitution. On September 13, TikTok announced that it would attempt to make a deal to sell the company to American tech company Oracle, removing speculation that the company could be bought by Microsoft. The Department of Commerce banned new downloads of TikTok on September 18, removing it from application stores a few days after.

== Proceedings ==
TikTok filed their initial complaint on September 18, 2020, in the District of Columbia district court. On September 23, TikTok also filed a motion for a preliminary injunction against Trump's order, which was granted in part and denied in part by Judge Carl J. Nichols on September 27. In his memorandum opinion, Judge Nichols concluded that TikTok was likely to succeed on the merits, because "informational materials" are transferred on the application. Irreparable harm was also shown due to the potential competitive losses suffered by TikTok if the ban were to be enacted. Judge Nichols also found that the government's interest was insufficient to warrant a full ban of TikTok.

On December 7, 2020, three days after the deadline to sell the company had passed, Nichols fully blocked Trump's request to ban TikTok in the United States. The judge argued that Trump's emergency economic powers did not suffice to operate an arbitrary ban on a mobile app. On July 21, 2021, following new President Joe Biden's decision to rescind President Trump's executive order, the lawsuit (then captioned TikTok v. Biden) was dismissed by joint stipulation of the parties.
