= No TikTok on Government Devices Act =

United States federal law

- Long title: An Act to prohibit certain individuals from downloading or using TikTok on any device issued by the United States or a government corporation.
- Enacted by: the 117th United States Congress
- Effective: December 29, 2022

Citations
- Public law: Pub. L. 117–328 (text) (PDF), Division R
- Statutes at Large: 136 Stat. 5258

Codification
- U.S.C. sections amended: 44 U.S.C. § 3553

Legislative history
- Introduced in the Senate as S. 1143 by Josh Hawley (R-MO) on April 15, 2021; Committee consideration by United States Senate Committee on Homeland Security and Governmental Affairs; Passed the Senate on December 14, 2022 (With unanimous consent); Passed the Senate on December 22, 2022 (68–29 as Division R of the Consolidated Appropriations Act, 2023 H.R. 2617); Agreed to by the House on December 23, 2022 (225–201–1 as the Consolidated Appropriations Act, 2023 H.R. 2617); Signed into law by President Joe Biden on December 29, 2022

The No TikTok on Government Devices Act is a United States federal law that prohibits the use of TikTok on all federal government devices. Originally introduced as a stand-alone bill in 2020, it was signed into law as part of the Consolidated Appropriations Act, 2023 on December 29, 2022, by President Joe Biden.

== Legislative history ==
The No TikTok on Government Devices Act (S. 3455) was originally introduced in 2020 by Senator Josh Hawley (R-MO) and passed the United States Senate by unanimous consent on August 6, 2020. The bill (S. 1143) was reintroduced on April 15, 2021, by Senator Hawley and it passed the Senate by unanimous consent again on December 14, 2022.

The bill was later included in the year-end omnibus spending bill as Division R of the Consolidated Appropriations Act, 2023, which then passed the Senate 68–29 on December 22, 2022, and the United States House of Representatives 225–201–1 on December 23, 2022, before being signed into law on December 29, 2022, by President Joe Biden.

== Provisions ==
The law prohibits the download or use of TikTok on, and requires the removal of TikTok from all federal government and government corporation devices. The law is effected by the Director of the Office of Management and Budget together with the Administrator of General Services, the Director of the Cybersecurity and Infrastructure Security Agency, the Director of National Intelligence and the Secretary of Defense. Exceptions may only be made for law enforcement, national security or security research purposes if it is authorized or allowed.

== See also ==
- Censorship of TikTok
- Efforts to ban TikTok in the United States
