= U.S. WeChat Users Alliance v. Trump =

Lawsuit between U.S. WeChat Users Alliance and President Donald J. Trump

- Court: United States District Court for the Northern District of California
- Full case name: U.S. WeChat Users Alliance, et al. v. Donald J. Trump, et al.

U.S. WeChat Users Alliance (USWUA) v. Trump was a court case pending before the United States District Court for the Northern District of California. The plaintiff won a preliminary injunction on September 20, 2020, blocking the Trump administration's ban order against WeChat based on concerns raised about harm to First Amendment rights and the hardships imposed on a minority community using the app as a primary means of communication. The lawsuit was dismissed in July 2021, following the Biden Administration's rescission of the executive order.

== Background ==
WeChat is a highly popular social media app in China. Many American families depend on WeChat as a means of communicating with family and friends in China.

On August 6, 2020, U.S. President Donald Trump signed an executive order, invoking the International Emergency Economic Powers Act, seeking to ban WeChat in the U.S. in 45 days, due to its connections with the Chinese-owned Tencent. This was signed alongside a similar executive order targeting TikTok (TikTok v. Trump) and its Chinese-owned ByteDance. Following the EO, the Department of Commerce issued orders on September 18, 2020, to enact the ban on WeChat and TikTok by the end of September 20, 2020, citing national security and data privacy concerns.

== Plaintiff ==
The plaintiff is the U.S. WeChat Users Alliance, including individuals Jinneng Bao, Chihuo Inc., Brent Coulter, Fangyi Duan, Elaine Peng, and Xiao Zhang. The alliance's trustees are described by the New York Times as including "several prominent Chinese-American lawyers". The group says it is not connected to Tencent.

== Proceedings ==
Magistrate Judge Laurel Beeler of the United States District Court for the Northern District of California issued a preliminary injunction blocking the Department of Commerce order on WeChat on September 20, 2020, citing the merits of the plaintiffs' First Amendment claims. The U.S. Justice Department appealed this injunction on October 2, 2020, calling Judge Beeler's decision an "error". On October 23, Judge Beeler said the new evidence presented by the U.S. Justice Department in early October did not change her mind regarding her injunction of the White House order. On December 23, the Trump administration asked the court to drop the U.S. WeChat Users Alliance v. Trump case to follow through on its ban of WeChat.

On December 31, 2020, the NYSE announced it would apply a White House order banning three Chinese telecom companies from US trading floors, including Alipay and WeChat Pay. Then, in early January 2021, Donald Trump issued an order to ban a total of 8 mobile apps on US soils, WeChat included, but the order would become effective under the Biden administration.

In 2021, the Biden administration dropped the ban on TikTok and WeChat with a new executive order that mandates accountability measures. The plaintiffs then moved to dismiss the case, which was granted.

== See also ==
- TikTok v. Trump
