= Efforts to ban TikTok in the United States =

Federal-government-imposed ban

The short-form video-hosting service TikTok was under a de jure nationwide ban in the United States from January 19, 2025, until January 22, 2026, due to the U.S. government's concerns over potential user data collection and influence operations by the government of the People's Republic of China. However, the ban was not enforced. The ban took effect after ByteDance, the China-based parent company of TikTok, refused to sell the service before the deadline of the Protecting Americans from Foreign Adversary Controlled Applications Act (PAFACA). Prior to the ban, individual states, cities, universities, and government-affiliated devices had restricted TikTok.

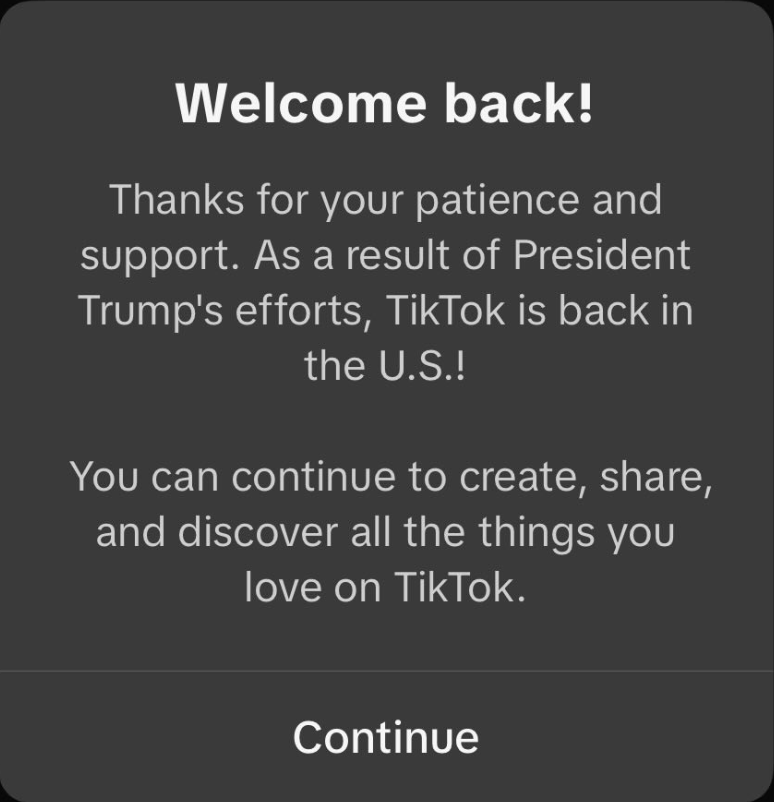
Message displayed to U.S. users on the TikTok app after the resumption of services on January 19, 2025

In 2020, President Donald Trump proposed a ban of TikTok, describing it as a potential national security risk. In August, he signed an executive order instructing ByteDance to divest from the app, but a court blocked the order with an injunction in September. The Biden administration later reversed the order in 2021. In 2024, as lawmakers and federal agencies voiced renewed security concerns, PAFACA was introduced in Congress. The bill was passed by Congress and signed into law by President Joe Biden. It set a deadline for the app to be banned unless a qualifying divestment were to be made before then. After TikTok filed a legal challenge, the Supreme Court upheld the law.

On January 18, 2025, the day before the deadline of the law, TikTok voluntarily suspended its services in the United States, even though Biden had declined to enforce the ban on his last day in office. The following day, after President-elect Trump signaled that he would grant an extension to TikTok upon being inaugurated, services were restored. On January 20, the first day of his term, Trump signed an executive order that halted enforcement of the ban for a 75-day period while his administration pursues a potential sale of TikTok to American owners. This brought the deadline to April 5. On April 4, Trump signed an executive order to delay the ban's enforcement for another 75 days, to June 19. Then, on June 19, Trump signed yet another executive order, extending the deadline to September 17, With each delay, the Trump administration sent letters to TikTok's service providers, claiming a sweeping power to effectively set aside laws.

On September 16, Trump signed a fourth executive order, titled "Further Extending the TikTok Enforcement Delay" (EO 14350). This order extended non-enforcement until December 16, 2025. On September 25, Trump signed a fifth executive order, "Saving TikTok While Protecting National Security", extending non-enforcement for a further 120 days (until January 22, 2026), in order to allow a divestiture of TikTok's U.S. operations to be completed. The deal closed on January 22, 2026, with TikTok's U.S. activities divested into the newly incorporated TikTok USDS, ending the period of the de jure ban.

== Background ==
In January 2019, an investigation by the American think tank Peterson Institute for International Economics described TikTok as a "Huawei-sized problem" that posed a national security threat to the West because of the app's popularity with Western users. They included risks to armed forces personnel due to the app's alleged ability to convey location, image, and biometric data to its Chinese parent company, which is legally unable to refuse to share data with the Chinese government under the China Internet Security Law. ByteDance's founder and CEO Zhang Yiming issued a letter in 2018 stating that his company would "further deepen cooperation" with the ruling Chinese Communist Party to promote its policies. ByteDance contends that TikTok is not available in China and its data is stored outside of China, but its privacy policy has reserved the right to share any information with Chinese authorities. In response to national security, censorship, and anti-boycott compliance concerns, in October 2019, Senator Marco Rubio asked the Committee on Foreign Investment in the United States (CFIUS) to open an investigation into TikTok and ByteDance. The same month, Senators Tom Cotton and Chuck Schumer sent a joint letter to the Director of National Intelligence requesting a security review of TikTok and ByteDance. In July 2020, the United States Department of the Treasury announced that TikTok was under CFIUS review.

In November 2019, the CFIUS opened an investigation into ByteDance's acquisition of Musical.ly. The same month, following a request by Senator Schumer, U.S. Army Secretary Ryan McCarthy agreed to assess the risks of using TikTok as a recruitment tool. Senator Josh Hawley introduced the National Security and Personal Data Protection Act to prohibit TikTok's parent company and others from transferring the personal data of Americans to China. Senator Hawley also introduced a bill to ban downloading and using TikTok on government devices because of national security concerns. In December 2019, the United States Navy as well as the U.S. Army banned TikTok from all government-issued devices. The Transportation Security Administration also prohibited its personnel from posting on the platform for outreach purposes. Following its prohibition by the U.S. military, the Australian Defence Force also banned TikTok on its devices. Legislation was subsequently introduced in the U.S. Senate that would prohibit all federal employees from using or downloading TikTok.

The Democratic National Committee issued a warning to the Democratic campaigns, state parties, and committees to ensure that additional security measures are implemented while using TikTok, citing concerns regarding the application's spying nature. In July 2020, the Joe Biden 2020 presidential campaign instructed its staff to delete TikTok for security reasons. Experts have been split on the question of whether or not TikTok poses a security risk, with some saying that it does while others have said that it does not.

== Federal restrictions ==
=== First Trump administration (2017–2021) ===
In December 2019, the United States Army and Navy banned TikTok on government devices after the Department of Defense labeled it a security risk. Before the policy change, army recruiters had been using the platform to attract young people. Unofficial promotional videos continue to be posted on TikTok under personal accounts, drawing the ire of government officials, but they have also helped boost the number of enlistees; several accounts have millions of views and followers.

On July 7, 2020, U.S. Secretary of State Mike Pompeo announced that the government was considering banning TikTok. In response, Sarah Cook, Freedom House's research director for China, Hong Kong, and Taiwan, suggested that Trump's proposed TikTok ban may threaten free speech and "set a very problematic precedent" for banning apps in the United States. Patrick Jackson, chief technology officer of privacy company Disconnect, said the app sends an abnormal amount of data—mostly information about the phone—to its server, but there is limited evidence that TikTok shares that data with the Chinese government. He also noted that the amount of collected data was similar to that collected by American-originated social media platforms and was less than that collected by Facebook.

=== Executive orders to ban TikTok ===
On July 31, 2020, President Donald Trump announced a decision ordering China's ByteDance to divest ownership of the application, and threatened to shut down its U.S. operations through executive action as soon as August 1 if the company did not comply. While the President has authority to intervene in transactions involving foreign companies doing business in the United States (including placing companies on an "entity list" that restricts their ability to conduct business with American companies), this sanctioning authority in relation to imported communications or information materials protected by the First Amendment is restricted under the International Emergency Economic Powers Act and the Trading with the Enemy Act of 1917. Trump did not specify how he would enforce a ban.

Microsoft was reported to be in talks of acquiring TikTok. Later that day, President Trump announced plans to ban TikTok in the United States. Trump's ban threat was condemned by TikTok users, many of whom argued that national security concerns were being used as a cover by the administration to justify a ban as retaliation for pranks aimed at Trump by TikTok users (particularly, a ticket-purchasing effort to inflate projected and depress actual attendance of his June 20 campaign rally in Tulsa, Oklahoma) and other content satirizing Trump or critical of him and his actions, especially in relation to his response to the George Floyd protests. Some have speculated that a ban or the threat thereof would result in political backlash, pushing many users (particularly within the app's core user base of adults aged 18–34, including those eligible to vote for the first time, which make up roughly 50% of the app's U.S. users) to vote against Trump, likely in favor of Democratic nominee Joe Biden, in the 2020 presidential election.

After Trump proposed to ban TikTok in the U.S. on July 31, 2020, security researchers expressed their concerns about the ensuing limitations on free speech. In one article, PCMag quoted Jennifer Granick of the American Civil Liberties Union who said that "banning an app that millions of Americans use to communicate with each other is a danger to free expression and is technologically impractical."

On August 1, ByteDance—which initially sought to maintain a minority interest in a sale to a U.S. buyer—agreed to divest TikTok outright to prevent a ban in the United States and in other countries (including Japan, Pakistan, and Australia) where restrictions are also being considered because of privacy concerns primarily related to its ownership by a China-based firm. A preliminary deal to sell the platform to Microsoft was submitted to President Trump for review, in which Microsoft would also assume data management responsibilities; preliminary terms allowed American investors in the platform to eventually acquire minority stakes in TikTok post-sale. Senator Lindsey Graham later expressed support for the Microsoft proposal.

In a video statement posted on TikTok that morning, Manager of U.S. Operations Vanessa Pappas stated that the company is "not planning on going anywhere" and is "building the safest app because we know it's the right thing to do." On August 2, it was reported by The Wall Street Journal that Microsoft had paused talks with ByteDance. Later that day, Microsoft confirmed that talks would continue following a conversation between CEO Satya Nadella and President Trump. Reportedly, after White House advisers persuaded him to hold off on banning TikTok outright because of the possible legal and political repercussions, Trump subsequently agreed to put a 45-day hold on any action against TikTok to allow ByteDance to divest the platform to Microsoft or, should a deal with the tech company not materialize, another American corporation.

On August 6, Trump signed Executive Order 13942, directing the Secretary of Commerce to prohibit all transactions between anyone under the jurisdiction of the United States and Bytedance if it did not sell TikTok to an American corporation; Trump also signed a similar order against the WeChat application owned by the Chinese multinational company Tencent. On August 14, Trump issued a new executive order giving ByteDance 90 days to sell or spin off its U.S. TikTok business. In the order, Trump said that there is "credible evidence" that ByteDance "might take action that threatens to impair the national security of the United States." On August 17, Oracle entered the race to buy TikTok's operations in the United States, Canada, Australia, and New Zealand, working with U.S. investors—including General Atlantic and Sequoia Capital, who own stakes in TikTok—to secure a bid.

=== Legal cases in response to attempted ban ===
On August 21, 2020, TikTok announced plans to file legal action challenging the order's to-be-outlined transactional prohibitions with U.S. companies. The lawsuit against the Trump administration's order—formally filed in the U.S. District Court for the Central District of California on August 24—contended that the administration's order was motivated by Trump's efforts to boost re-election support through protectionist trade policies aimed at China; that TikTok and ByteDance were deprived of due process rights under the Fifth Amendment that apply to foreign and domestic businesses; that the Presidential order failed to provide evidence that TikTok was a bona fide security threat or provide "justification for its punitive actions"; that the order had relied on a May 2019 national emergency declaration with respect to "Securing the Information and Communications Technology and Services Supply Chain", rather than invoking a new emergency declaration; and that the purported national security threat identified by the CFIUS was based on "outdated news articles" and did not address demonstrative data security documentation provided by TikTok. The company iterated that many of its top personnel—including then-CEO Kevin Mayer—were based within the United States and were not subject to Chinese law, and that content moderation was led by an independent, U.S.-based technical staff. The lawsuit also contended that the order's application of the IEEPA violated a 1994 Congressional amendment expanding that act's list of First Amendment-protected materials to encompass any media, including software technologies, regardless of "format or medium of transmission."

A separate suit filed in the U.S. District Court for the Northern District of California the same day by TikTok's U.S. technical program manager Patrick Ryan against Trump and Secretary of Commerce Wilbur Ross sought a temporary restraining order. to prevent its enforcement by the Department of Commerce in order to ensure that TikTok employees could continue to be paid their salaries. Ryan argued that the executive order's restrictions on financial transactions with banks, credit firms, and payroll providers unlawfully jeopardized TikTok's U.S. employees' ability to receive salary payments, and that the ambiguity on prohibited transactions with ByteDance violated Ryan's due process rights as well as being an "unconstitutional taking" of Ryan's property under the Fifth Amendment. In addition to claims that it was motivated by anti-China bias, the lawsuit also said Trump's action was likely also a retaliatory action over the aforementioned prank targeting the June 20 campaign rally.

The Department of Justice contended in a September 10 response to Ryan's lawsuit that his claims of irreparable financial harm by the order was speculative until Secretary Ross issued further guidance and alone did not justify a TRO, and that neither Ryan nor the court had the right to determine whether the order was issued in response to a bona fide national emergency. This was because the order involved a "nonjusticiable political question" and Congress has not created a right of action for citizens to challenge use of the IEEPA and the National Emergencies Act.

On August 28, the Chinese government's Commerce and Science and Technology Ministries updated their export control rules, restricting the export of "technology based on data analysis for personalized information recommendation services." The restrictions—which had not been updated since 2008 and, although government officials asserted that it was not aimed at any particular company, was seen as an effort to delay or prohibit a full sale of TikTok—effectively required ByteDance to undergo a government-reviewed licensing procedure if parts of TikTok were sold to a company based outside China.

=== Proposed sale to Oracle ===
On September 13, ByteDance informed Microsoft that it would not sell TikTok's U.S. operations to the Seattle-based tech company; at issue was Microsoft's proposal to acquire TikTok's algorithm and other artificial intelligence technology, which ByteDance executives believed would likely be opposed by the Chinese government. The Chinese government had recently criticized the Trump Administration's order as a "smash and grab" forced sale, while ByteDance suggested that it would prefer the shuttering of U.S. operations over such a sale. On September 13, it was reported that TikTok had chosen Oracle to act as the former's "trusted tech partner." The partnership—intended to address the Trump administration's concerns over data security, and avoid an outright sale of its business and technological assets that the Chinese government would likely oppose—would involve ByteDance to transfer management of the app's U.S. user data to Oracle's cloud services, and possibly offer it and other investors expanded minority stakes in the U.S. operations whilst allowing ByteDance to keep control of TikTok's business assets and intellectual property. Observers stated that political considerations also played a factor in the deal, citing Oracle Chairman Larry Ellison's support of Trump—he was one of the few U.S. tech executives to support Trump's presidency—and his role as one of Trump's major campaign donors as well as Co-CEO Safra Catz's former role on Trump's transition team following his 2016 election.

On September 15, the Financial Times reported that the Oracle deal would be structured as a spin-off of TikTok as an independent company with minority stakes held by Oracle—which would then be responsible for ensuring that user data is processed under U.S. jurisdiction. The Associated Press reported on September 18 that the U.S. would proceed with its ban on TikTok downloads on September 20, followed by a complete ban of using the app on November 12.

On September 19, TikTok and ByteDance filed a complaint in Washington, challenging the Trump Administration's recent moves to prevent the app from operating in the U.S., citing that the administration did so for political reasons rather than to stop an "unusual and extraordinary threat". The Trump Administration postponed the planned ban by one week.

=== Preliminary injunction ===
On September 23, 2020, TikTok filed a request for a preliminary injunction to prevent the app from being banned by the Trump Administration. This request was filed with the District Court for the District of Columbia. Just a week prior, a different preliminary injunction from WeChat users filed with the United States District Court for the Northern District of California was approved by Magistrate Judge Laurel Beeler. The preliminary injunction was approved by Judge Carl J. Nichols on September 27.

=== Biden administration (2021–2025) ===
Executive Order 14034 ("EO 14034"), "Protecting Americans' Sensitive Data from Foreign Adversaries"

On June 9, 2021, the Biden administration issued Executive Order 14034, "Protecting Americans' Sensitive Data from Foreign Adversaries" ("EO 14034"), overturning three executive orders signed by Donald Trump: Executive Order 13942, Executive Order 13943, and Executive Order 13971. Despite revoking these Executive Orders, the Biden Administration's EO 14034 has called upon other federal agencies to continue a broad review of foreign-owned applications set to continuously inform the President of the risk that the applications pose to personal data and national security. The White House said that, "The Biden Administration is committed to promoting an open, interoperable, reliable, and secure Internet; protecting human rights online and offline; and supporting a vibrant, global digital economy."

In October 2021, following the Facebook Files and controversies about social media ethics, a bipartisan group of lawmakers pressed TikTok, YouTube, and Snapchat on questions of data privacy and moderation for age-appropriate content. Lawmakers questioned Michael Beckerman, head of U.S. policy at TikTok, on whether the company's Chinese ownership could expose consumer data to Beijing, and stating concerns that the company could be required by the Chinese government to turn Americans' data over to the government. TikTok told U.S. lawmakers that it does not give information to China's government, and that data on American users is stored in the U.S. with backups in Singapore. According to the company's representative, TikTok had 'no affiliation' with the subsidiary Beijing ByteDance Technology, in which the Chinese government has a minority stake and board seat.

In June 2022 reports emerged that ByteDance employees in China could access U.S. data and repeatedly accessed the private information of TikTok users, TikTok employees were cited saying that "everything is seen in China," while one director claimed a Beijing-based engineer referred to as a "Master Admin" has "access to everything." Following the reports, TikTok announced that 100% of its U.S. user traffic is now being routed to Oracle Cloud, along with their intention to delete all U.S. user data from their own datacenters. This arrangement stemmed from the talks with Oracle instigated in September 2020 in the midst of Trump's threat to ban the app, though Oracle did not ultimately acquire any part of TikTok.

On June 24 and June 28, FCC Commissioner Brendan Carr called for Google and Apple to remove TikTok from their app stores, citing national security concerns, saying TikTok "harvests swaths of sensitive data that new reports show are being accessed in Beijing." In November, Senators Mark Warner and Tom Cotton called for greater action against TikTok, while Senator Marco Rubio and Representative Mike Gallagher announced their intentions to introduce legislation to ban the platform.

By late 2022, many Republican and Democratic officials who previously opposed the attempted ban began to change their perspectives, with many coming to the conclusion that Trump's actions were justified. Democratic Senator Mark Warner stated "As painful as it is for me to say, if Donald Trump was right and we could've taken action then, that'd have been a heck of a lot easier than trying to take action in November of 2022. The sooner we bite the bullet, the better." In March 2023, Trump posted to his social media platform that both Democrats and Republicans had come to "realize that I was right" that a ban on TikTok was needed for reasons of "China Influence and National Security".

On December 2, FBI director Chris Wray warned about the security threats posed by TikTok. In response, South Dakota and several other states, many of which were controlled by the Republican Party, banned the use of TikTok on government computers and smartphones. Later that month, Congress passed a bill to do the same on federal devices as part of the spending bill for fiscal year 2023.

In December 2022, Senator Marco Rubio and representatives Mike Gallagher and Raja Krishnamoorthi introduced the Averting the National Threat of Internet Surveillance, Oppressive Censorship and Influence, and Algorithmic Learning by the Chinese Communist Party Act (ANTI-SOCIAL CCP Act), which would prohibit Chinese- and Russian-owned social networks from doing business in the United States.

On December 30, 2022, President Joe Biden signed the No TikTok on Government Devices Act, prohibiting the use of the app on devices owned by the federal government, with some exceptions. Days after the Biden administration called on ByteDance, which owns TikTok, to sell the platform or face a ban, law enforcement officials disclosed that an investigation into TikTok was taking place. On March 17, 2023, the United States Department of Justice (DOJ) and the Federal Bureau of Investigation (FBI) officially launched an investigation of TikTok, including allegations that the company spied on American journalists.

On January 25, 2023, Missouri Senator Josh Hawley introduced a bill to ban the platform nationwide. After Shou Zi Chew, the CEO of TikTok, testified before the U.S. House of Representatives, Hawley's attempt to force a vote on this bill in the Senate was blocked on March 29, 2023, when Kentucky Senator Rand Paul objected.

In February and March 2023, the DATA Act and the RESTRICT Act were both introduced in the House of Representatives and Senate, respectively. The DATA Act, introduced on February 24 by Michael McCaul, aimed to ban selling non-public personal data to third-party buyers. On March 7, Senator Mark Warner introduced the RESTRICT Act: if passed, it would give the Secretary of Commerce authority to review business transactions made by IT service and product vendors tied to designated "foreign adversaries" if they present an undue threat to national security, and have more than one million active users in the United States. The legislation would allow for the enforcement of orders and other mitigation measures, which could include mandatory divestment, or being prohibited from doing business in the United States.

Several officials subsequently cited alleged pro-Palestinian bias on the app. While advocating for a ban, Representative Mike Gallagher alleged "rampant pro-Hamas propaganda on the app". Senators Mitt Romney, Josh Hawley, Representative Mike Lawler, and other Republicans have also alleged that TikTok had a pro-Palestine bias, with Lawler even alleging that TikTok was being manipulated during pro-Palestinian protests at colleges. In a filing to the Supreme Court, TikTok's attorneys said, "Allegations that TikTok has amplified support for either side of the Israeli- Palestinian conflict are unfounded."

On March 13, 2024, the United States House of Representatives passed the Protecting Americans from Foreign Adversary Controlled Applications Act (PAFACA) with largely bipartisan support from Democratic and Republican representatives. It would ban operations related to the app completely within the country unless ByteDance makes a qualified divestiture as determined by the U.S. president. After modifications, the act passed the House again and the United States Senate before it was signed into law by Joe Biden on April 24, 2024. The ban went into effect on January 19, 2025. An additional 90 days could be issued on the deadline.

==== Legal challenge ====
U.S. Supreme Court ruling on TikTok v. Garland

TikTok v. Garland oral arguments on January 10, 2025

TikTok, Inc. v. Garland, 604 U.S. 56 (2025), was a United States Supreme Court case brought by ByteDance Ltd. and TikTok challenging the constitutionality of the Protecting Americans from Foreign Adversary Controlled Applications Act (PAFACA) based on the Freedom of Speech Clause of the First Amendment, the Bill of Attainder Clause of Article One, Section Nine. The case was consolidated with Firebaugh v. Garland, a lawsuit TikTok content creators filed which also challenged the law.

=== National security and civil liberties concerns ===
Debate surrounding a potential United States ban on TikTok has centered on tensions between national security interests and civil liberties. According to an analysis published by the Jackson School of International Studies at the University of Washington, U.S. officials have raised concerns that TikTok's ownership by the Chinese company ByteDance could allow the Chinese government access to sensitive user data or enable influence operations through content moderation and recommendation algorithms.

The article notes that critics of a ban argue such actions could set a precedent for government overreach, raise First Amendment concerns, and disproportionately affect younger users who rely on the platform for communication, activism, and economic opportunities. Legal scholars and policy analysts cited in the report emphasize the need to balance data security and foreign influence risks with protections for free expression, due process, and equal treatment under the law.

=== 2025 shutdown ===
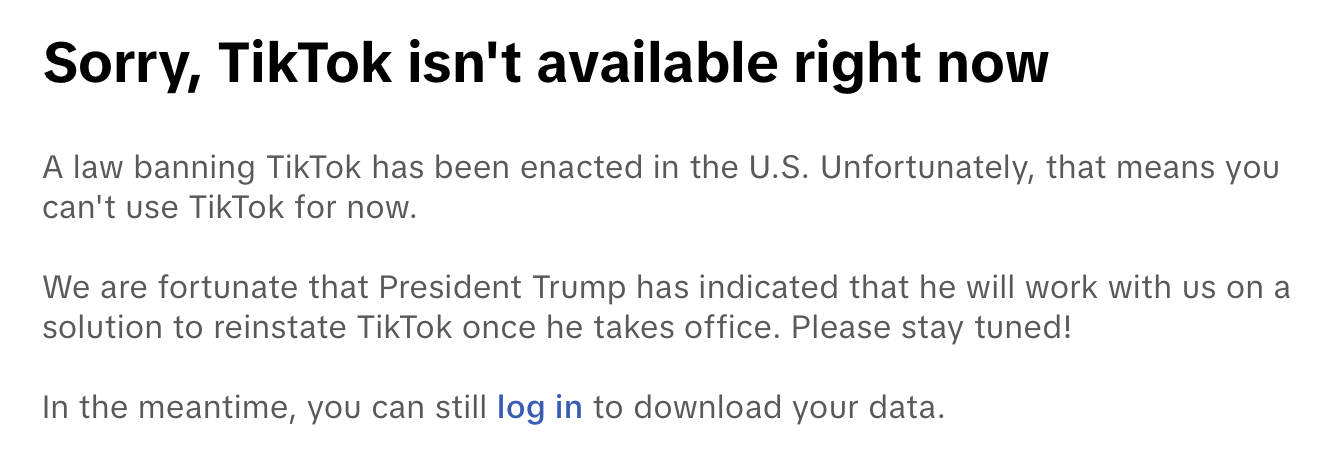
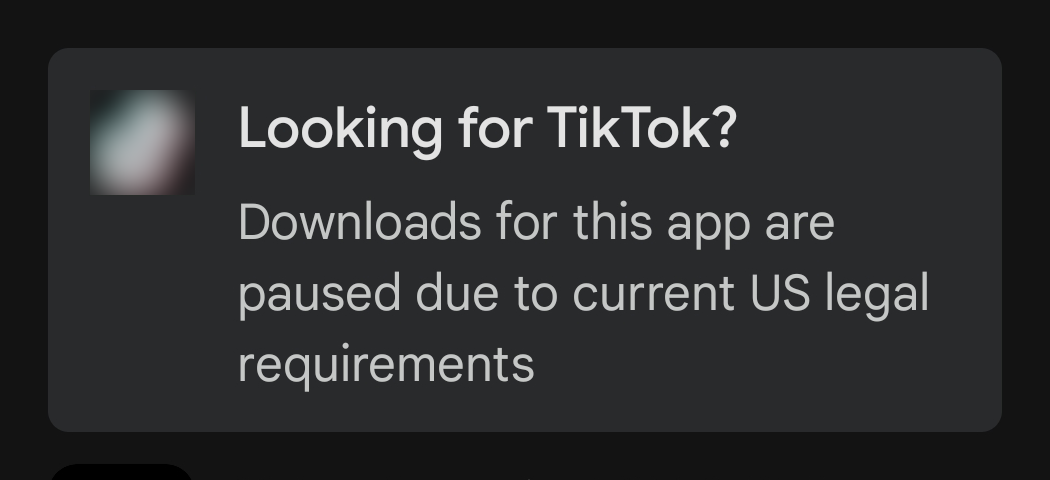
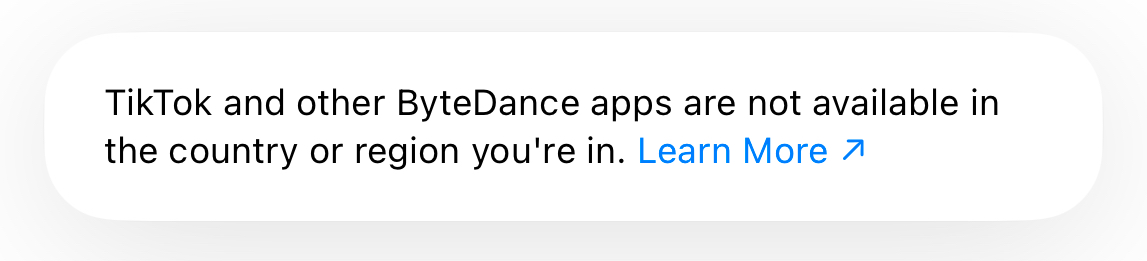
Messages displayed to US users who searched for TikTok on the TikTok website (top), Google Play Store (middle), and Apple App Store (bottom) while the ban was in effect

In January 2025, TikTok users began exploring options for a "mass migration" to other apps in the event that TikTok were to be banned. On January 13, many U.S. TikTok users began downloading and switching to the Chinese app Xiaohongshu (or RedNote), which is similar to Instagram and TikTok, in protest of the ban. The hashtag "#tiktokrefugee" and the term TikTok refugee went viral on RedNote, being used by both American and Chinese users. The app became the most-downloaded free app on the Apple App Store, and gained millions of U.S. users by January 16. RedNote moderators worked overtime to translate content into English and accommodate the influx of new users.

On January 16, a Biden administration official stated that it would forego any decision on whether to enforce the ruling to the incoming Trump administration. On January 18, at approximately 10:30 p.m. EST, TikTok made their services temporarily unavailable in the United States after ByteDance refused to divest before the deadline of PAFACA. The app was removed from the Apple App Store and Google Play Store for users in the United States, effectively blocking them from downloading the application onto most mobile devices. Users with the application still installed received an error message informing them that the service was to become temporarily inaccessible in the U.S., and users visiting the website were shown a similar error message. Users were able to download their TikTok account data and sign in via the website, although all social functions, such as uploading, watching, commenting, or viewing profiles, were disabled. Similar shutdowns of apps with connections to ByteDance followed, including Marvel Snap, Mobile Legends: Bang Bang, CapCut, Lemon8, and Tokopedia.

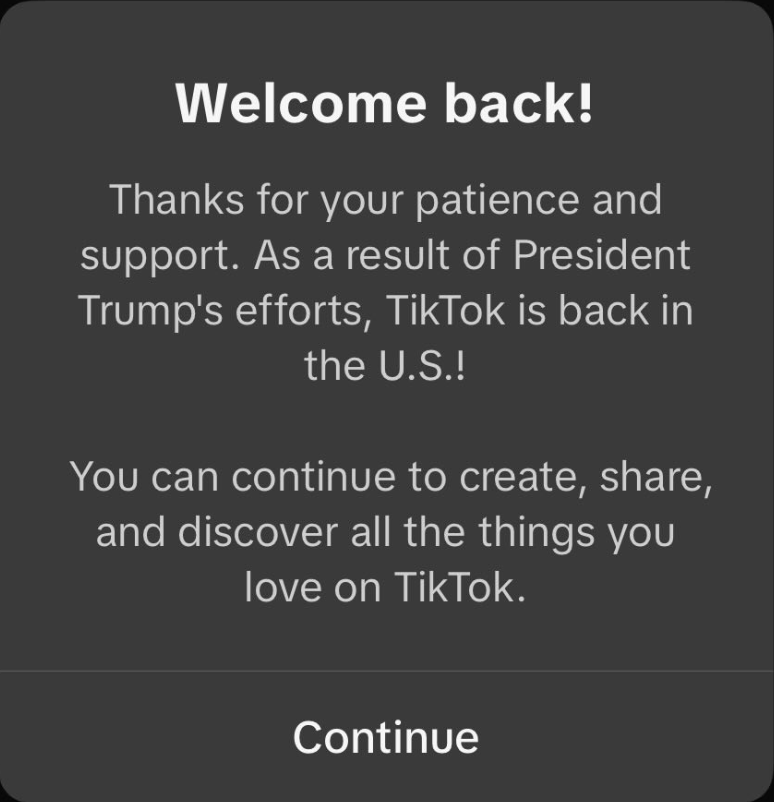
Message displayed to U.S. users on the TikTok app after the resumption of services on January 19, 2025

Hours after the suspension of services took effect, President-elect Donald Trump indicated on Truth Social that he would issue an executive order on the day of his inauguration "to extend the period of time before the law's prohibitions take effect". At 12:00 p.m. EST on January 19, TikTok began restoring service. In a post on X, they stated that Trump provided "assurance to our service providers that they will face no penalties". Later on January 19, Speaker of the House Mike Johnson said, "I think we will enforce the law" and that his expectation is that TikTok would again be available on app stores only after Trump forces "a true divestiture, changing of hands, the ownership" of TikTok from ByteDance to a U.S. company. Apple and Google have blocked efforts from TikTok to restore the app to their app stores. Senator Tom Cotton praised this, warning that companies that help maintain or distribute TikTok "could face hundreds of billions of dollars of ruinous liability under the law".

=== Second Trump administration (2025–present) ===
Donald Trump campaigned on promises of not banning TikTok, despite his original opposition. Trump's cabinet picks for the Federal Communications Commission (FCC), as well as most Republicans, remained in favor of banning the app. Trump mentioned that after taking office, he would pursue a 'political resolution' regarding the issue.

On January 20, the first day of his second presidency, Trump signed an executive order that instituted a 75-day period of non-enforcement of PAFACA. The order also suggested that a liability shield would be provided to companies that provided services to TikTok during that time. Trump stated that his administration would work toward a deal for "the United States to have a 50% ownership position in a joint venture". Based on this executive order, Acting Attorney General James McHenry sent letters to companies that provide services to TikTok, including Apple, Google, and Oracle.

Letters from Attorney General Pam Bondi telling 10 companies that they can continue providing services to TikTok despite federal law banning it

On social media, Trump stated that his administration would work toward a deal for "the United States to have a 50% ownership position in a joint venture". Trump later ordered the creation of a sovereign wealth fund, which he suggested could buy TikTok. On January 25, negotiations were reported as being underway for a deal that would entail a takeover of TikTok's U.S. operations by Oracle and American investors, addressing national security concerns, with a decision expected within 30 days. ByteDance would retain a stake while Oracle would manage data and software updates.

Near the start of February, U.S. vice president JD Vance and National Security Advisor Michael Waltz were announced as being in charge of negotiating a potential TikTok sale. U.S. attorney general Pam Bondi sent letters to tech companies promising they would not face fines for hosting TikTok and other ByteDance apps during that time, prompting Apple and Google to restore these apps to their app stores on February 13.

On April 4, one day before the period of non-enforcement was set to expire, President Trump signed an executive order again delaying the enforcement of the TikTok ban by 75 days. He had nearly secured a deal that included ByteDance maintaining a minority position in a new company based in the U.S. and owned by American investors, but China withdrew its support for the deal due to Trump imposing reciprocal tariffs against it.

On June 19, Trump signed a third executive order to delay the ban 90 days, instead of the usual 75.

On July 3, Attorney General Pam Bondi's letters to 10 tech companies became public due to two lawsuits under the Freedom of Information Act. According to Bondi, because Trump had decided that an "abrupt shutdown" of TikTok would interfere with his "constitutional duties," the law banning TikTok must give way to the President's "core presidential national security and foreign affairs powers." Additionally, the letters to Apple Inc., Google, and Microsoft claim that "the Department of Justice is also irrevocably relinquishing any claims the United States might have had against" the companies for violating the TikTok ban.

Legal experts noted that presidents "don't have the power to change the law itself" and described the administration's "radical theory of presidential power" as an "astonishing" claim that "could set a very corrosive precedent." According to Jack Goldsmith, a Harvard Law School professor who previously led DOJ's Office of Legal Counsel, "the president and the attorney general have asserted a power to wipe out the effects of any law related to national security or foreign affairs on the president's say so," an assertion that is "maybe the broadest I have ever seen any president or Justice Department make, ever, in any context."

On 14 September 2025, The Wall Street Journal reported the U.S. and China reached the "framework of a deal" for the U.S. operations of TikTok to be sold to a consortium of investors in the U.S. The deal was expected to be announced by President Donald Trump and General Secretary Xi Jinping as part of broader tariff discussions.

=== Fourth executive order (September 16, 2025) ===
Following the deal framework, on September 16, 2025, one day before the September 17 deadline, Trump signed Executive Order 14350 titled "Further Extending the TikTok Enforcement Delay," extending non-enforcement of PAFACA until December 16, 2025. It was the fourth time Trump had bypassed the statutory deadline.

=== Fifth executive order and divestiture (September 25, 2025 – January 22, 2026) ===
On September 25, 2025, Trump signed a fifth executive order, "Saving TikTok While Protecting National Security", extending non-enforcement of PAFACA for a further 120 days (until January 22, 2026) in order to allow a divestiture of TikTok's U.S. operations to be finalized. The order outlined that ByteDance and its affiliates would retain less than 20% of the new entity, with 80% held by American investors. On December 18, 2025, TikTok signed a memorandum to sell its U.S. operations to a consortium of investors including Oracle, Silver Lake, and MGX, who would each hold a 15% share, while 30.1% would be held by existing ByteDance investors and 19.9% retained by ByteDance.

The deal closed on January 22, 2026, and saw the divestment of TikTok's U.S. activities into the newly incorporated company TikTok USDS, ending the period of the de jure ban.

== Other restrictions ==
Map as of March 2024. As of April 2024, more than 30 states have banned the use of TikTok on government devices, including some university computer Wifi networks, though students can still use their own devices and data plans. Ban enacted No ban

On April 14, 2023, Montana became the first state to pass legislation banning TikTok on all personal devices operating within state lines, and barring app stores from offering TikTok for download. Governor Greg Gianforte signed the bill, Senate Bill (SB) 419, into law on May 17. The ban was blocked by U.S. District Judge Donald W. Molloy on December 1, 2023, as he stated the ban "infringes on the Constitutional right of users and businesses". Due to the block, the ban did not come into effect as planned.

As of April 2023, at least 34 out of 50 states have announced or enacted bans on state government agencies, employees, and contractors using TikTok on government-issued devices. State bans only affect government employees and do not prohibit civilians from having or using the app on their personal devices.

State	Date	Ref.
Alabama	December 13, 2022	
Alaska	January 6, 2023	
Arizona	April 5, 2023	
Arkansas	January 10, 2023	
Delaware	January 19, 2023	
Florida	August 11, 2020	
Georgia	December 15, 2022	
Idaho	December 14, 2022	
Indiana	December 7, 2022	
Iowa	December 13, 2022	
Kansas	December 28, 2022	
Kentucky	January 12, 2023	
Louisiana	December 19, 2022	
Maine	January 19, 2023	
Maryland	December 6, 2022	
Michigan	March 1, 2023	
Mississippi	January 11, 2023	
Montana	December 16, 2022	
Nebraska	August 12, 2020	
Nevada	March 28, 2023	
New Hampshire	December 15, 2022	
New Jersey	January 9, 2023	
North Carolina	January 12, 2023	
North Dakota	December 13, 2022	
Ohio	January 8, 2023	
Oklahoma	December 8, 2022	
Oregon	July 24, 2023	
South Carolina	December 5, 2022	
South Dakota	November 29, 2022	
Tennessee	December 10, 2022	
Texas	December 7, 2022	
Utah	December 12, 2022	
Vermont	February 20, 2023	
Virginia	December 16, 2022	
Wisconsin	January 12, 2023	
Wyoming	December 15, 2022	

In August 2023, New York City banned TikTok on government-owned devices for security reasons.

Some public universities have also banned TikTok on campus Wi-Fi and university-owned computers. These include, but are not limited to:

- Arizona State University
- Arkansas State University
- Arkansas Tech University
- Auburn University
- Black Hills State University
- Boise State University
- Clemson University
- Dakota State University
- Idaho State University
- Iowa State University
- Lamar University
- Langston University
- McLennan Community College
- Montana University System
- Morgan State University
- Northeastern State University
- Northern State University
- Northwestern Oklahoma State University
- Oklahoma State University
- Purdue University
- South Dakota School of Mines and Technology
- South Dakota State University
- Texas A&M University System
- Texas State Technical College
- Texas State University
- Texas Tech University System
- University of Arizona
- University of Arkansas System
- University of Central Oklahoma
- University of Florida
- University of Houston System
- University of Idaho
- University of Iowa
- University of Northern Iowa
- University of Oklahoma
- University of South Dakota
- University of Texas at Arlington
- University of Texas at Austin
- University of Texas at Dallas
- University of Texas at San Antonio
- University of Texas Rio Grande Valley
- University of Wisconsin System
- University System of Georgia
- West Texas A&M University

== Reactions ==
TikTok said the company takes regular action against covert influence networks and has "more than 150 elections globally" behind it. ByteDance is incorporated in the Cayman Islands, while TikTok Inc. is incorporated in California and Delaware and says 60% of ByteDance is owned by global institutional investors.

TikTok began working on Project Texas after 2020 to address data concerns from the U.S. government. From 2019 to 2024, TikTok and ByteDance combined spent $27 million on lobbying in the United States, including their hire of SKDK, a public affairs firm, in 2023 according to Politico. Reuters reported that according to its sources, if all legal methods to block the April 2024 ban are exhausted, ByteDance would prefer to shut down TikTok than sell it with its core algorithm, which is also subject to China's export control. On May 7, 2024, ByteDance and TikTok filed a lawsuit in the United States District Court for the District of Columbia to overturn PAFACA.

In March 2024, a spokesperson for Ministry of Foreign Affairs of the People's Republic of China said PAFACA was putting the U.S. on "the opposite side of the principle of fair competition and international economic and trade rules." Representatives from the Embassy of China in Washington, D.C. met with U.S. congressional staffers to lobby against the bill. The Central Propaganda Department of the Chinese Communist Party also instructed the country's state media outlets to increase positive coverage of ByteDance. Overall, Beijing's response seems to be muted so far.

Content creators described concerns about how they would make their living should a ban take effect. Following the passing of PAFACA, eight TikTok content creators sued the United States government on May 14, 2024, in United States Court of Appeals for the District of Columbia Circuit in an effort to overturn the act; the choice of venue was due to a provision in the act making it the "exclusive jurisdiction" for legal challenges of the act.

=== Criticism ===
Bans and attempted bans in the United States have drawn objections citing hypocrisy, protectionism, and not addressing user data privacy in general. Lawmakers making allegations against TikTok fail to mention that the United States itself surveils non-U.S. nationals under Section 702 of FISA. The types of data collected by TikTok are also collected by other social media platforms and sold through brokers to private buyers and reportedly government agencies as well, without oversight. Some researchers from the Citizen Lab and the Center for Strategic and International Studies stated that user information in general should be protected, not just focusing on one platform. Critics, including Republican congressmen Rand Paul and Thomas Massie, have also labeled a potential ban on the app an assault on freedom of speech.

Observers have argued that the national security concerns raised are largely hypothetical. There is insufficient public evidence to show that American user data has been accessed by or shared with the PRC government, with some claims reportedly exaggerated. Biden himself was on TikTok as the president, while Trump has reversed his previous position. Lawmakers against the bill said the process was quickly rushed. Computer security specialist Bruce Schneier has argued that which company owns TikTok may be irrelevant since, for example, Russia interfered in the 2016 U.S. elections via Facebook despite not owning it.

Congressional advocates for a ban have stated that the platform supports an anti-Israel bias, arguing that manipulation justifies a nationwide ban. Analysis from Vox countered this argument, stating that support for the Palestinian cause has been growing among younger generations, who make up the majority of TikTok's users, even before the October 7 attacks. Analysts argued that popular videos on the app in support of Palestinians or criticizing Israel were "likely an accurate reflection of the beliefs shared by the majority of users using the platform".

== See also ==
- Censorship of TikTok
- Rednote
- China–United States trade war

== Sources ==
- Benson, Peter J.; Brannon, Valerie C.; Lampe, Joanna R. (May 9, 2024). Regulation of TikTok Under the Protecting Americans from Foreign Adversary Controlled Applications Act: Analysis of Selected Legal Issues (Report). Congressional Research Service.
- Sutherland, Michael D.; Benson, Peter J.; Cho, Clare Y. (May 14, 2024). TikTok: Frequently Asked Questions and Issues for Congress (Report). Congressional Research Service.
- Benson, Peter J.; Brannon, Valerie C.; Lampe, Joanna R. (December 19, 2024). TikTok v. Garland: Constitutional Challenges to the Protecting Americans from Foreign Adversary Controlled Applications Act (Report). Congressional Research Service.
