= TikTok, Inc. v. Garland =

2025 U.S. Supreme Court decision

- Supreme Court of the United States

Argued January 10, 2025 Decided January 17, 2025
- Full case name: TikTok, Inc. et al., Petitioners v. Merrick B. Garland, Attorney General; Brian Firebaugh, et al., Petitioners v. Merrick B. Garland, Attorney General
- Docket nos.: 24-656; 24-657
- Citations: 604 U.S. 56 (more)
- Argument: Oral argument
- Decision: Opinion

Case history
- Prior: Petition for review denied. TikTok Inc. and ByteDance Ltd. v. Garland, 122 F. 4th 930 (D.C. Cir 2024).

Questions presented
- Whether the Protecting Americans from Foreign Adversary Controlled Applications Act, as applied to petitioners, violates the First Amendment.

Holding
- The provisions of the Act do not violate petitioners’ First Amendment rights.

Court membership
- Chief Justice John Roberts Associate Justices Clarence Thomas · Samuel Alito; Sonia Sotomayor · Elena Kagan; Neil Gorsuch · Brett Kavanaugh; Amy Coney Barrett · Ketanji Brown Jackson

Case opinions
- Per curiam
- Concurrence: Sotomayor
- Concurrence: Gorsuch (in judgement)

Laws applied
- U.S. Const. amend I; Protecting Americans from Foreign Adversary Controlled Applications Act

TikTok, Inc. v. Garland, 604 U.S. 56 (2025), was a United States Supreme Court case brought by ByteDance Ltd. and TikTok challenging the constitutionality of the Protecting Americans from Foreign Adversary Controlled Applications Act (PAFACA) based on the Freedom of Speech Clause of the First Amendment, the Bill of Attainder Clause of Article One, Section Nine. The case was consolidated with Firebaugh v. Garland, a lawsuit TikTok content creators filed which also challenged the law.

Citing national security concerns, the U.S. Congress in April 2024 passed PAFACA which prohibits the hosting and distribution of apps determined by the President to present a significant national security threat if they are made by social media companies owned by foreign nationals or parent companies from countries designated as U.S. foreign adversaries, unless such companies are divested from the foreign entities. The law specifically named Chinese company ByteDance Ltd. and TikTok as "foreign adversary controlled". The deadline for their divestment was January 19, 2025.

ByteDance sued the federal government following passage of PAFACA, asserting the law violated the First and Fifth Amendments. A panel of judges from the U.S. District of Columbia Circuit Court of Appeals unanimously rejected the company's claims about the constitutionality of the law in December 2024 and declined to grant a temporary injunction. ByteDance then sought review by the Supreme Court.

The Supreme Court granted certiorari for TikTok's appeal on an expedited schedule, and heard oral arguments on January 10, 2025, nine days before the law's divestment deadline. In a per curiam decision released on January 17, 2025, the Court ruled that the law was constitutional, as Congress had shown the law satisfies intermediate scrutiny review based on their concerns related to national security.

== Background ==
Prior to introducing legislation, bipartisan members of Congress had expressed concern on privacy and national security issues relates to foreign-controlled services like TikTok. The Protecting Americans from Foreign Adversary Controlled Applications Act was introduced by Representative Mike Gallagher on December 7, 2023. The bill prohibiting the distribution, maintenance, and hosting of applications controlled by foreign adversaries as deemed by Congress and the President, giving them 180 days to divest the service from foreign control or cease its operation, or otherwise face penalties. It would also require app stores to block distribution of the service. The bill explicitly targeted ByteDance Ltd. The bill was later incorporated into H.R. 815, a broader spending bill, where Division H retained PAFACA provisions, requiring ByteDance to divest TikTok's U.S. operations within 270 days of the bill's passage to avoid a ban. President Joe Biden signed PAFACA into law on April 24, 2024.

== Lower court history ==
On May 7, 2024, TikTok and ByteDance filed a lawsuit against U.S. Attorney General Merrick Garland in the Court of Appeals for the District of Columbia Circuit, challenging the legislation primarily on First Amendment grounds, alleging that the forced divestiture or ban of the platform would violate the free speech rights of the company and its users. The company accused the U.S. government of operating on "hypothetical" national security concerns, contending that it has not outlined any credible security threat posed by the platform in an adequate manner, and has not explained why TikTok "should be excluded from evaluation under the standards Congress concurrently imposed on every other platform." The lawsuit also alleged that the Chinese government would not permit ByteDance to include the algorithm that has been the "key to the success of TikTok in the United States".

In the lawsuit, TikTok requested a declaratory judgment to prevent the PAFACA from being enforced. The Court of Appeals expedited the case, setting oral arguments for September 2024, and a decision by December 2024. In June 2024, TikTok presented briefs to the court that laid out why the company believes the ban to be unconstitutional under the First Amendment. TikTok argued any divestiture or separation would take years and the law runs afoul of Americans' free speech rights. The brief included a 90-page proposal about plans by TikTok to address American national security concerns. The U.S. Department of Justice (DOJ) responded the following month, in which it asked the court to reject TikTok's legal challenge. The DoJ argued the law is aimed at addressing national security concerns, not speech, and is aimed at China's ability to exploit TikTok to access Americans' sensitive personal information. The DOJ alleged that ByteDance employees in China obtained sensitive information on U.S. users, such as views on abortion, religion, and gun control, from overseas TikTok employees through Lark. In August and September 2024, DOJ filed classified documents with the court to outline additional security concerns regarding ByteDance's ownership of TikTok.

Oral arguments were held on September 16, 2024. On December 6, 2024, the Court of Appeals rejected TikTok's constitutional arguments and found that the law does not "contravene the First Amendment to the Constitution of the United States", nor does it "violate the Fifth Amendment guarantee of equal protection of the laws". Judge Douglas H. Ginsburg wrote in the court's majority opinion: "The First Amendment exists to protect free speech in the United States. Here the Government acted solely to protect that freedom from a foreign adversary nation and to limit that adversary's ability to gather data on people in the United States." While the majority opinion concluded that the law triggered heightened scrutiny, it did not decide whether strict scrutiny or intermediate scrutiny should apply but concluded that the law satisfied the strict scrutiny standard, while the concurring opinion in the case filed by Chief Judge Sri Srinivasan also concluded that the law did not violate the First Amendment but only needed to satisfy intermediate scrutiny.

However, because the government referenced content on TikTok in its justification for the law, the majority opinion concluded that the law could still trigger strict scrutiny. The government cited two national security concerns as justifications for the law: "(1) to counter the PRC's efforts to collect great quantities of data about tens of millions of Americans; and (2) to limit the PRC's ability to manipulate content covertly on the TikTok platform". The majority opinion concluded that these justifications were compelling government interests, and deferred to the government's evaluations of factual circumstances and predictions that TikTok would likely comply with PRC requests to manipulate content on the platform. After concluding that the law was facially content-neutral, the majority opinion concluded that any new owner of TikTok "could circulate the same mix of content as before without running afoul of the [PAFACA]", and that the government's concern was about "covert content manipulation" due to its control by a foreign adversary country rather than "content suppression"—which was how the company had characterized the government's position.

The majority opinion concluded that the TikTok-specific provisions of the law were narrowly tailored to achieving the government's national security concerns, and that it would be inappropriate for the court to "reject the Government's risk assessment and override its ultimate judgment" that a national security agreement that the company proposed to the government was less effective than the law's ban-or-divestment requirement. The concurring opinion also concluded that the law is content-neutral, but when considered along with the history of restrictions on foreign control of broadcast media in the United States, the concurring opinion concluded that the law only needed to satisfy intermediate scrutiny. With respect to TikTok's equal protection claims under the Due Process Clause, the DC Circuit concluded that the company's claims "boil[ed] down to pointing out that TikTok alone is singled out by name in the [PAFACA]" but that the differential treatment was justified by the "TikTok-specific national security harms identified and substantiated by the Government".

Following the Supreme Court's ruling in Lingle v. Chevron U.S.A. Inc. (2005), the DC Circuit rejected TikTok's assertion that the PAFACA constituted a per se regulatory taking under the Takings Clause because TikTok can pursue a qualified divestment under the law and thus would not be deprived of all economic use of TikTok, while the DC Circuit also concluded that the difficulties related to a divestment asserted by the company are instead caused by PRC export regulations rather than the PAFACA. Following the framework established in Nixon v. General Services Administration (1977), the DC Circuit also concluded that the PAFACA did not qualify as a bill of attainder because while the court concluded that the law applies with specificity, the court also concluded that it does not constitute a legislative punishment because the law's divestment requirement is "a sale, not a confiscation", is more analogous to a line of business restriction rather than an employment ban, serves a non-punitive and preventive national security purpose, and that "TikTok [did] not come close to satisfying [the] requirement" of demonstrating that the legislative record shows a congressional intent to punish by passing the law.

On December 9, TikTok and ByteDance filed a motion for an injunction in the case to allow the app to continue operating until the U.S. Supreme Court decides whether to hear an appeal of the DC Circuit Court of Appeals panel ruling. The appellate court rejected the motion on December 13. On the same day, the United States House Select Committee on Strategic Competition between the United States and the Chinese Communist Party sent letters in reference to the December 6 ruling to the chief executive officers of Apple Inc. and Alphabet Inc. to instruct the companies to be prepared to comply with the law by the January 19 deadline.

== Supreme Court ==
U.S. Supreme Court ruling on TikTok v. Garland

On December 16, TikTok appealed the injunction decision to the Supreme Court. On December 18, the Supreme Court issued a writ of certiorari to hear the case and scheduled oral arguments for January 10, 2025. The court limited the scope of its review to the legal issue of PAFACA's constitutionality under the Freedom of Speech Clause of the First Amendment. One "sign of the significance of the issue" was that the court moved with "extraordinary speed". The court took only two days to respond to TikTok's application, did not follow its customary practice of waiting for the government to respond, and immediately set oral argument for a special hearing (normally, oral argument is set only after the parties have filed their briefing on the merits of an appeal). On December 27, President-elect Donald Trump filed an amicus brief that urged the Court to issue a stay of the law's divestiture deadline without assuming a position on the merits of either party's position.

Oral arguments were held as scheduled on January 10. Noel Francisco, a former Solicitor General of the United States, represented TikTok, Jeffrey L. Fisher represented the creators in the consolidated case Firebaugh v. Garland, and Solicitor General Elizabeth Prelogar represented the government. Observers said the Court appeared likely to uphold the law, with a majority expressing skepticism at TikTok's arguments.

=== Opinion ===
The Supreme Court issued a per curiam decision on January 17, 2025, holding that even if this regulation of business ownership implicated First Amendment rights by burdening the free speech of TikTok users, it survives review under intermediate scrutiny. Agreeing with the D.C. Circuit, the unsigned opinion considered PAFACA as content-neutral, despite exempting certain types of foreign-owned businesses, because it equally burdened all types of content on TikTok. The ruling stated that "Congress has determined that divestiture is necessary to address its well-supported national security concerns regarding TikTok’s data collection practices and relationship with a foreign adversary" and that the law "does not violate petitioners' First Amendment rights". The ruling further stated that their decision was "narrowly focused" to apply to TikTok only due to the timing of the pending deadline.

Associate Justices Sonia Sotomayor and Neil Gorsuch wrote concurring opinions. Sotomayor believed the Court should have squarely held that PAFACA implicates First Amendment rights, rather than evading that threshold question by merely assuming it does and then upholding the law's constitutionality anyway. Gorsuch opined that the Court should have applied strict scrutiny while agreeing that the government met either burden by pointing to TikTok's "vast troves of personal information about tens of millions of Americans".

== Aftermath ==
TikTok did not actively seek a divestment to comply with PAFACA after its passage. Immediately after the Supreme Court ruling, TikTok stated they will be forced to shut down on January 19 without any commitment from the Biden administration that they would not enforce PAFACA. A spokesperson for Joe Biden stated that because Donald Trump would be inaugurated on January 20, any decisions related to PAFACA enforcement would be left to the incoming administration. TikTok services went down on January 18, 2025, and the app as well as other products made by ByteDance were removed from app stores. A message to users stated that the shutdown was expected to be temporary. With Trump's assurances that he will issue an executive order extending the deadline and not prosecute app store owners, TikTok started restoring its service on January 19, 2025, though neither Apple nor Google restored TikTok and other ByteDance apps in their respective stores initially.

Trump signed the executive order as promised on January 20 following his inauguration, delaying the enforcement of PAFACA for 75 days until April 5, 2025, for his administration to have "an opportunity to determine the appropriate course forward". Trump signed a second executive order on April 4, 2025, further delaying enforcement for another 75 days; this came the same week Trump announced new tariffs on most of the US's trading partners including China, with Trump suggesting he would lower tariffs in exchange for ByteDance's sale of TikTok. Trump issued another executive order in June 2025 to extend the deadline by 90 additional days, stating that he was still working out a deal with China. On the eve of this last extension's deadline, Trump issued yet another order to push the deadline out to December 16, 2025, with The Wall Street Journal reporting that this period would allow ByteDance to negotiate with a consortium of American investors, including Oracle Corporation, Silver Lake, and Andreessen Horowitz, to take 80% ownership of TikTok and operate the service from American servers, with a new app that was in development by ByteDance. Trump signed an executive order approving the sale of TikTok's US operations to the consortium on September 25, 2025. TikTok agreed to the sale of its US operations on December 18, 2025, to the consortium of Oracle, Silver Lake, and MGX, forming a new company called TikTok USDS Joint Venture LLC. The deal closed on January 22, 2026, under which Joint Venture will maintain control of the TikTok app and the content algorithm behind it, and over time customize it to favor topics for American audiences. Each of Oracle, Silver Lake, and MGX took 15% ownership, while ByteDance retained a 19.9% stake.

== See also ==
- Lawsuits involving TikTok
- Freedom of speech in the United States
- United States free speech exceptions
