= Public Law 118-50 =

United States legislation

- Long title: Making emergency supplemental appropriations for the fiscal year ending September 30, 2024, and for other purposes.
- Announced in: the 118th United States Congress

Citations
- Public law: Pub. L. 118–50 (text) (PDF)

Legislative history
- Introduced in the House as H.R. 815 by Cathy McMorris Rodgers (R–WA) on February 2, 2023; Committee consideration by United States House Committee on Veterans' Affairs; Passed the House on March 7, 2023; Passed the Senate on February 13, 2024 with an amendment (70-29); Agreed to by the House on April 20, 2024 (366-58 311-112 385-34 360-58) and by the Senate on April 23, 2024 (79-18); Signed into law by President Joe Biden on April 24, 2024

Public Law 118-50 (referred to as the National Security Act, 2024 in drafts) is an appropriations bill enacted by the 118th Congress and signed into law by president Joe Biden on April 24, 2024. It provides $95.3 billion of foreign aid for Ukraine, Israel, and Taiwan, and includes the 21st Century Peace through Strength Act, which itself includes the Protecting Americans from Foreign Adversary Controlled Applications Act. It also includes the Protecting Americans' Data from Foreign Adversaries Act that bans data broker companies from selling Americans' personal data to U.S. foreign adversaries.

== Legislative history ==
The law passed the House of Representatives on April 20, 2024, as H.R. 8034, H.R. 8035, H.R. 8036, and H.R. 8038. The law passed the Senate on April 23. It was signed on April 24.

== See also ==
- 2024 United States federal budget
- United States support for Israel in the Gaza war
- List of military aid to Ukraine during the Russo-Ukrainian War
