= United States foreign adversaries =

United States legal designation

Foreign adversaries of the United States (U.S.), as defined in 15 CFR 791.2, are "any foreign government or foreign non-government person determined by the United States Secretary of Commerce to have engaged in a long-term pattern or serious instances of conduct significantly adverse to the national security of the United States or security and safety of United States persons". The designation was introduced by U.S. President Donald Trump under Executive Order 13873 which declared a national emergency with respect to the "security, integrity, and reliability of information and communications technology and services provided and used in the United States".

== Background ==
When Executive Order 13873 was signed on May 15, 2019, no specific countries or other targets were named. However, the order was understood at the time to primarily target Chinese firms such as Huawei. On January 19, 2021, the U.S. Department of Commerce issued an interim final rule which designated a number of countries and individuals as foreign adversaries (see below for list) but without categorically prohibiting or requiring a license for any specific activity. Joe Biden as president subsequently signed Executive Order 14034, which revoked Trump's orders 13942, 13943 and 13971 but granted broader powers to the Department of Commerce to restrict foreign technology firms, while establishing criteria.

The Protecting Americans from Foreign Adversary Controlled Applications Act (PAFACA), signed into law by Joe Biden on April 24, 2024, created the designation of "foreign adversary controlled application" (FACA) with TikTok and its parent company ByteDance as explicit targets. Some commentators suggested that the move to ban or force the sale of TikTok as a FACA was driven by U.S. leaders' concern over pro-Palestinian content on the app in the context of the Gaza war and genocide. In January 2025, the U.S. Department of Justice issued regulations which for the first time prohibited U.S. persons from entering into certain transactions which could give "covered persons" (those primarily resident in a "country of concern" including all designated foreign adversary countries, or working for an agency from a country of concern, or designated by the U.S. Attorney General) access to U.S. citizens' personal data, reflecting a fear among law enforcement and national security agencies that existing rules were insufficient to counter an increasing risk of electronic espionage as technology and data analysis developed.

A 2024 report by the U.S. Commission for the National Defense Strategy argued that the U.S. "must be prepared to confront an axis of multiple adversaries."

== List ==
The following are "foreign adversaries" according to 15 CFR 791.4:

- People's Republic of China (China), including
  - Hong Kong Special Administrative Region
  - Macau Special Administrative Region
- Republic of Cuba (Cuba)
- Islamic Republic of Iran (Iran)
- Democratic People's Republic of Korea (North Korea)
- Russian Federation (Russia)
- (Venezuela) Venezuelan politician Nicolás Maduro ("Maduro Regime")

In addition, 10 U.S.C. § 4872(d)(2) "Acquisition of sensitive materials from non-allied foreign nations: prohibition" defines "covered nation" as:

- (North Korea) Democratic People's Republic of Korea
- People's Republic of China
- (Russia) Russian Federation
- Islamic Republic of Iran

This was used to define "foreign adversary country" in PAFACA.

== Reactions ==
Some U.S. state laws prohibit individuals from countries listed among foreign adversaries from buying property assets. For example, Louisiana state law prohibits foreign adversaries listed in 15 CFR 7.4 (now replaced as above) to acquire real property within the state. The state of Virginia prohibits foreign adversaries purchasing agricultural land from Virginia.

Executive Order 13873 was criticized by legal scholar Ari Bental for the ambiguity of many terms used, including the new designation of "foreign adversary", and lack of procedural safeguards against arbitrary use of the designation by Trump or another president. Concern was also expressed that the order could impact U.S. businesses, including possibly voiding insurance coverage by triggering policies' war exclusion.

The Carnegie Endowment for International Peace (CEIP) warned that treating these countries as an "axis" will "more likely than not aggravate the challenges they pose to U.S. interests and possibly create a self-fulfilling prophecy by driving these countries closer together". CEIP stated that designated foreign adversaries each have their own reasons to perceive the U.S. as an "existential threat", but do not have long-term shared interests, and argued that U.S. policy should use "individual strategies tailored to each country’s specific conditions, instead of bringing them all to the same common denominator."

== See also ==
- Foreign policy of the United States
- United States sanctions
- United States Department of State list of Foreign Terrorist Organizations
- Axis of evil
- State Sponsors of Terrorism
- Foreign information manipulation and interference
- Hostile foreign forces
