= List of speakers of the United States House of Representatives =

The speaker of the United States House of Representatives is the presiding officer of the United States House of Representatives. The office was established in 1789 by Article I, Section 2, of the U.S. Constitution. The speaker is the political and parliamentary leader of the House, and is simultaneously the body's presiding officer, the de facto leader of the body's majority party, and the institution's administrative head. Speakers also perform various administrative and procedural functions, all in addition to representing their own congressional district. Given these several roles and responsibilities, the speaker usually does not personally preside over debates. That duty is instead delegated to members of the House from the majority party. Neither does the speaker regularly participate in floor debates. Additionally, the speaker is second in the presidential line of succession, after the vice president and ahead of the president pro tempore of the Senate.

The House elects a new speaker by roll call vote when it first convenes after a general election for its two-year term, or when a speaker dies, resigns or is removed from the position intra-term. A majority of votes cast (as opposed to a majority of the full membership of the House) is necessary to elect a speaker. If no candidate receives a majority vote, then the roll call is repeated until a speaker is elected. The Constitution does not require the speaker to be an incumbent member of the House, although every speaker thus far has been. Altogether, 56 individuals, from 24 states, have served as speaker of the House.

== List of speakers ==
The House has elected a speaker 128 times since 1789: at the start of each of the 118 congresses, plus on 10 occasions when a vacancy arose during a Congress via death, resignation, or motion to vacate. Of the 56 people who have served as speaker of the House over the past 237 years, 32 served multiple terms; seven of them served nonconsecutive terms: Frederick Muhlenberg, Henry Clay, John W. Taylor, Thomas Brackett Reed, Joseph W. Martin Jr., Sam Rayburn, and Nancy Pelosi. Every speaker of the House has been a member of a political party or faction; the number affiliated with each is:

Democratic – 22; (Note: During James K. Polk's tenure as Speaker, the Jacksonian bloc amalgamated into the modern Democratic Party.) Republican – 18; Democratic-Republican – 6; (Note: John Taylor served as speaker twice in the 1820s; initially he was as a member of the Democratic–Republican Party, and later, when the party began to fracture, he sided with its pro–Adams faction.) Jacksonian – 3; Whig – 3; Federalist – 2; Pro-Administration – 2; (Note: Frederick Muhlenberg served as speaker twice in the 1790s, before political factions coalesced into formal parties; initially he identified with the pro–administration faction, but later he aligned himself with the anti–administration faction.) National Republican – 1; American – 1; Anti-Administration – 1.

List of speakers of the United States House of Representatives
Congress	Term	Portrait	Name	Party	District (Note: The district listed is the district the speaker represented at the time they were in office, which may be different in different Congresses due to redistricting.)
1st	April 1, 1789 – March 4, 1791		Frederick Muhlenberg	Pro-Administration	Pennsylvania at-large
2nd	October 24, 1791 – March 4, 1793		Jonathan Trumbull Jr.	Pro-Administration	Connecticut at-large
3rd	December 2, 1793 (Note: Multi-ballot election.) – March 4, 1795		Frederick Muhlenberg	Anti-Administration	Pennsylvania at-large
4th	December 7, 1795 – March 4, 1797		Jonathan Dayton	Federalist	New Jersey at-large
5th	May 15, 1797 – March 4, 1799		Jonathan Dayton	Federalist	New Jersey at-large
6th	December 2, 1799 – March 4, 1801		Theodore Sedgwick	Federalist	Massachusetts 1
7th	December 7, 1801 – March 4, 1803		Nathaniel Macon	Democratic- Republican	North Carolina 5
8th	October 17, 1803 – March 4, 1805		Nathaniel Macon	Democratic- Republican	North Carolina 6
9th	December 2, 1805 – March 4, 1807		Nathaniel Macon	Democratic- Republican	North Carolina 6
10th	October 26, 1807 – March 4, 1809		Joseph Bradley Varnum	Democratic- Republican	Massachusetts 4
11th	May 22, 1809 – March 4, 1811		Joseph Bradley Varnum	Democratic- Republican	Massachusetts 4
12th	November 4, 1811 – March 4, 1813		Henry Clay	Democratic- Republican	Kentucky 5
13th	May 24, 1813 – January 19, 1814 (Note: Resigned from office and from Congress.)		Henry Clay	Democratic- Republican	Kentucky 2
13th	January 19, 1814 (Note: Intra-term special election.) – March 4, 1815		Langdon Cheves	Democratic- Republican	South Carolina 1
14th	December 4, 1815 – March 4, 1817		Henry Clay	Democratic- Republican	Kentucky 2
15th	December 1, 1817 – March 4, 1819		Henry Clay	Democratic- Republican	Kentucky 2
16th	December 6, 1819 – October 28, 1820		Henry Clay	Democratic- Republican	Kentucky 2
16th	November 15, 1820 – March 4, 1821		John W. Taylor	Democratic- Republican	New York 11
17th	December 4, 1821 – March 4, 1823		Philip P. Barbour	Democratic- Republican	Virginia 11
18th	December 1, 1823 – March 6, 1825		Henry Clay	Democratic- Republican	Kentucky 3
19th	December 5, 1825 – March 4, 1827		John W. Taylor	National Republican (Pro-Adams)	New York 17
20th	December 3, 1827 – March 4, 1829		Andrew Stevenson	Jacksonian	Virginia 9
21st	December 7, 1829 – March 4, 1831		Andrew Stevenson	Jacksonian	Virginia 9
22nd	December 5, 1831 – March 4, 1833		Andrew Stevenson	Jacksonian	Virginia 9
23rd	December 2, 1833 – June 2, 1834		Andrew Stevenson	Jacksonian	Virginia 11
23rd	June 2, 1834 – March 4, 1835		John Bell	Jacksonian	Tennessee 7
24th	December 7, 1835 – March 4, 1837		James K. Polk	Jacksonian	Tennessee 9
25th	September 4, 1837 – March 4, 1839		James K. Polk	Democratic	Tennessee 9
26th	December 16, 1839 – March 4, 1841		Robert M. T. Hunter	Whig	Virginia 9
27th	May 31, 1841 – March 4, 1843		John White	Whig	Kentucky 9
28th	December 4, 1843 – March 4, 1845		John Winston Jones	Democratic	Virginia 6
29th	December 1, 1845 – March 4, 1847		John Wesley Davis	Democratic	Indiana 6
30th	December 6, 1847 – March 4, 1849		Robert Charles Winthrop	Whig	Massachusetts 1
31st	December 22, 1849 – March 4, 1851		Howell Cobb	Democratic	Georgia 6
32nd	December 1, 1851 – March 4, 1853		Linn Boyd	Democratic	Kentucky 1
33rd	December 5, 1853 – March 4, 1855		Linn Boyd	Democratic	Kentucky 1
34th	February 2, 1856 – March 4, 1857		Nathaniel P. Banks	American	Massachusetts 7
35th	December 7, 1857 – March 4, 1859		James Lawrence Orr	Democratic	South Carolina 5
36th	February 1, 1860 – March 4, 1861		William Pennington	Republican	New Jersey 5
37th	July 4, 1861 – March 4, 1863		Galusha A. Grow	Republican	Pennsylvania 14
38th	December 7, 1863 – March 4, 1865		Schuyler Colfax	Republican	Indiana 9
39th	December 4, 1865 – March 4, 1867		Schuyler Colfax	Republican	Indiana 9
40th	March 4, 1867 – March 3, 1869		Schuyler Colfax	Republican	Indiana 9
40th	March 3, 1869 – March 4, 1869		Theodore M. Pomeroy	Republican	New York 24
41st	March 4, 1869 – March 4, 1871		James G. Blaine	Republican	Maine 3
42nd	March 4, 1871 – March 4, 1873		James G. Blaine	Republican	Maine 3
43rd	March 4, 1873 – March 4, 1875		James G. Blaine	Republican	Maine 3
44th	December 6, 1875 – August 19, 1876 (Note: Died in office.)		Michael C. Kerr	Democratic	Indiana 3
44th	December 4, 1876 – March 4, 1877		Samuel J. Randall	Democratic	Pennsylvania 3
45th	October 15, 1877 – March 4, 1879		Samuel J. Randall	Democratic	Pennsylvania 3
46th	March 18, 1879 – March 4, 1881		Samuel J. Randall	Democratic	Pennsylvania 3
47th	December 5, 1881 – March 4, 1883		J. Warren Keifer	Republican	Ohio 8
48th	December 3, 1883 – March 4, 1885		John G. Carlisle	Democratic	Kentucky 6
49th	December 7, 1885 – March 4, 1887		John G. Carlisle	Democratic	Kentucky 6
50th	December 5, 1887 – March 4, 1889		John G. Carlisle	Democratic	Kentucky 6
51st	December 2, 1889 – March 4, 1891		Thomas Brackett Reed	Republican	Maine 1
52nd	December 8, 1891 – March 4, 1893		Charles Frederick Crisp	Democratic	Georgia 3
53rd	August 7, 1893 – March 4, 1895		Charles Frederick Crisp	Democratic	Georgia 3
54th	December 2, 1895 – March 4, 1897		Thomas Brackett Reed	Republican	Maine 1
55th	March 15, 1897 – March 4, 1899		Thomas Brackett Reed	Republican	Maine 1
56th	December 4, 1899 – March 4, 1901		David B. Henderson	Republican	Iowa 3
57th	December 2, 1901 – March 4, 1903		David B. Henderson	Republican	Iowa 3
58th	November 9, 1903 – March 4, 1905		Joseph Gurney Cannon	Republican	Illinois 18
59th	December 4, 1905 – March 4, 1907		Joseph Gurney Cannon	Republican	Illinois 18
60th	December 2, 1907 – March 4, 1909		Joseph Gurney Cannon	Republican	Illinois 18
61st	March 15, 1909 – March 4, 1911		Joseph Gurney Cannon	Republican	Illinois 18
62nd	April 4, 1911 – March 4, 1913		Champ Clark	Democratic	Missouri 9
63rd	April 7, 1913 – March 4, 1915		Champ Clark	Democratic	Missouri 9
64th	December 6, 1915 – March 4, 1917		Champ Clark	Democratic	Missouri 9
65th	April 2, 1917 – March 4, 1919		Champ Clark	Democratic	Missouri 9
66th	May 19, 1919 – March 4, 1921		Frederick H. Gillett	Republican	Massachusetts 2
67th	April 11, 1921 – March 4, 1923		Frederick H. Gillett	Republican	Massachusetts 2
68th	December 5, 1923 – March 4, 1925		Frederick H. Gillett	Republican	Massachusetts 2
69th	December 7, 1925 – March 4, 1927		Nicholas Longworth	Republican	Ohio 1
70th	December 5, 1927 – March 4, 1929		Nicholas Longworth	Republican	Ohio 1
71st	April 15, 1929 – March 4, 1931		Nicholas Longworth	Republican	Ohio 1
72nd	December 7, 1931 – March 4, 1933		John Nance Garner	Democratic	Texas 15
73rd	March 9, 1933 – August 19, 1934		Henry Thomas Rainey	Democratic	Illinois 20
74th	January 3, 1935 – June 4, 1936		Jo Byrns	Democratic	Tennessee 5
74th	June 4, 1936 – January 3, 1937		William B. Bankhead	Democratic	Alabama 7
75th	January 5, 1937 – January 3, 1939		William B. Bankhead	Democratic	Alabama 7
76th	January 3, 1939 – September 15, 1940		William B. Bankhead	Democratic	Alabama 7
76th	September 16, 1940 – January 3, 1941		Sam Rayburn	Democratic	Texas 4
77th	January 3, 1941 – January 3, 1943		Sam Rayburn	Democratic	Texas 4
78th	January 6, 1943 – January 3, 1945		Sam Rayburn	Democratic	Texas 4
79th	January 3, 1945 – January 3, 1947		Sam Rayburn	Democratic	Texas 4
80th	January 3, 1947 – January 3, 1949		Joseph W. Martin Jr.	Republican	Massachusetts 14
81st	January 3, 1949 – January 3, 1951		Sam Rayburn	Democratic	Texas 4
82nd	January 3, 1951 – January 3, 1953		Sam Rayburn	Democratic	Texas 4
83rd	January 3, 1953 – January 3, 1955		Joseph W. Martin Jr.	Republican	Massachusetts 14
84th	January 3, 1955 – January 3, 1957		Sam Rayburn	Democratic	Texas 4
85th	January 3, 1957 – January 3, 1959		Sam Rayburn	Democratic	Texas 4
86th	January 7, 1959 – January 3, 1961		Sam Rayburn	Democratic	Texas 4
87th	January 3, 1961 – November 16, 1961		Sam Rayburn	Democratic	Texas 4
87th	January 10, 1962 – January 3, 1963		John W. McCormack	Democratic	Massachusetts 12
88th	January 9, 1963 – January 3, 1965		John W. McCormack	Democratic	Massachusetts 9
89th	January 4, 1965 – January 3, 1967		John W. McCormack	Democratic	Massachusetts 9
90th	January 10, 1967 – January 3, 1969		John W. McCormack	Democratic	Massachusetts 9
91st	January 3, 1969 – January 3, 1971		John W. McCormack	Democratic	Massachusetts 9
92nd	January 21, 1971 – January 3, 1973		Carl Albert	Democratic	Oklahoma 3
93rd	January 3, 1973 – January 3, 1975		Carl Albert	Democratic	Oklahoma 3
94th	January 14, 1975 – January 3, 1977		Carl Albert	Democratic	Oklahoma 3
95th	January 4, 1977 – January 3, 1979		Tip O'Neill	Democratic	Massachusetts 8
96th	January 15, 1979 – January 3, 1981		Tip O'Neill	Democratic	Massachusetts 8
97th	January 5, 1981 – January 3, 1983		Tip O'Neill	Democratic	Massachusetts 8
98th	January 3, 1983 – January 3, 1985		Tip O'Neill	Democratic	Massachusetts 8
99th	January 3, 1985 – January 3, 1987		Tip O'Neill	Democratic	Massachusetts 8
100th	January 6, 1987 – January 3, 1989		Jim Wright	Democratic	Texas 12
101st	January 3, 1989 – June 6, 1989		Jim Wright	Democratic	Texas 12
101st	June 6, 1989 – January 3, 1991		Tom Foley	Democratic	Washington 5
102nd	January 3, 1991 – January 3, 1993		Tom Foley	Democratic	Washington 5
103rd	January 5, 1993 – January 3, 1995		Tom Foley	Democratic	Washington 5
104th	January 4, 1995 – January 3, 1997		Newt Gingrich	Republican	Georgia 6
105th	January 7, 1997 – January 3, 1999 (Note: Resigned from Congress and declined re-election for speaker.)		Newt Gingrich	Republican	Georgia 6
106th	January 6, 1999 – January 3, 2001		Dennis Hastert	Republican	Illinois 14
107th	January 3, 2001 – January 3, 2003		Dennis Hastert	Republican	Illinois 14
108th	January 7, 2003 – January 3, 2005		Dennis Hastert	Republican	Illinois 14
109th	January 3, 2005 – January 3, 2007		Dennis Hastert	Republican	Illinois 14
110th	January 4, 2007 – January 3, 2009		Nancy Pelosi	Democratic	California 8
111th	January 6, 2009 – January 3, 2011		Nancy Pelosi	Democratic	California 8
112th	January 5, 2011 – January 3, 2013		John Boehner	Republican	Ohio 8
113th	January 3, 2013 – January 3, 2015		John Boehner	Republican	Ohio 8
114th	January 6, 2015 – October 29, 2015		John Boehner	Republican	Ohio 8
114th	October 29, 2015 – January 3, 2017		Paul Ryan	Republican	Wisconsin 1
115th	January 3, 2017 – January 3, 2019		Paul Ryan	Republican	Wisconsin 1
116th	January 3, 2019 – January 3, 2021		Nancy Pelosi	Democratic	California 12
117th	January 3, 2021 – January 3, 2023		Nancy Pelosi	Democratic	California 12
118th	January 7, 2023 – October 3, 2023 (Note: Vacated by a vote of the House)		Kevin McCarthy	Republican	California 20
118th	October 25, 2023 – January 3, 2025		Mike Johnson	Republican	Louisiana 4
119th	January 3, 2025 – Incumbent		Mike Johnson	Republican	Louisiana 4

== Speakers by time in office ==
The durations mentioned below are calculated based on date differences; if one were to count by the number of calendar days, all the values would be one day longer.

Additionally, since many speakers held office for multiple terms, often with non-consecutive periods, the time listed for each speaker represents the total length of their time as speaker. The period between the adjournment of one Congress and the convening of the next Congress is not included in the calculations. For instance, Nathaniel Macon served as speaker during both the 8th and 9th Congresses, but the eight-month gap between the two Congresses is not included in his service duration. The exact dates of service for each individual speaker is shown in the Term of service column of the above table.

Official seal of the Speaker of the United States House of Representatives

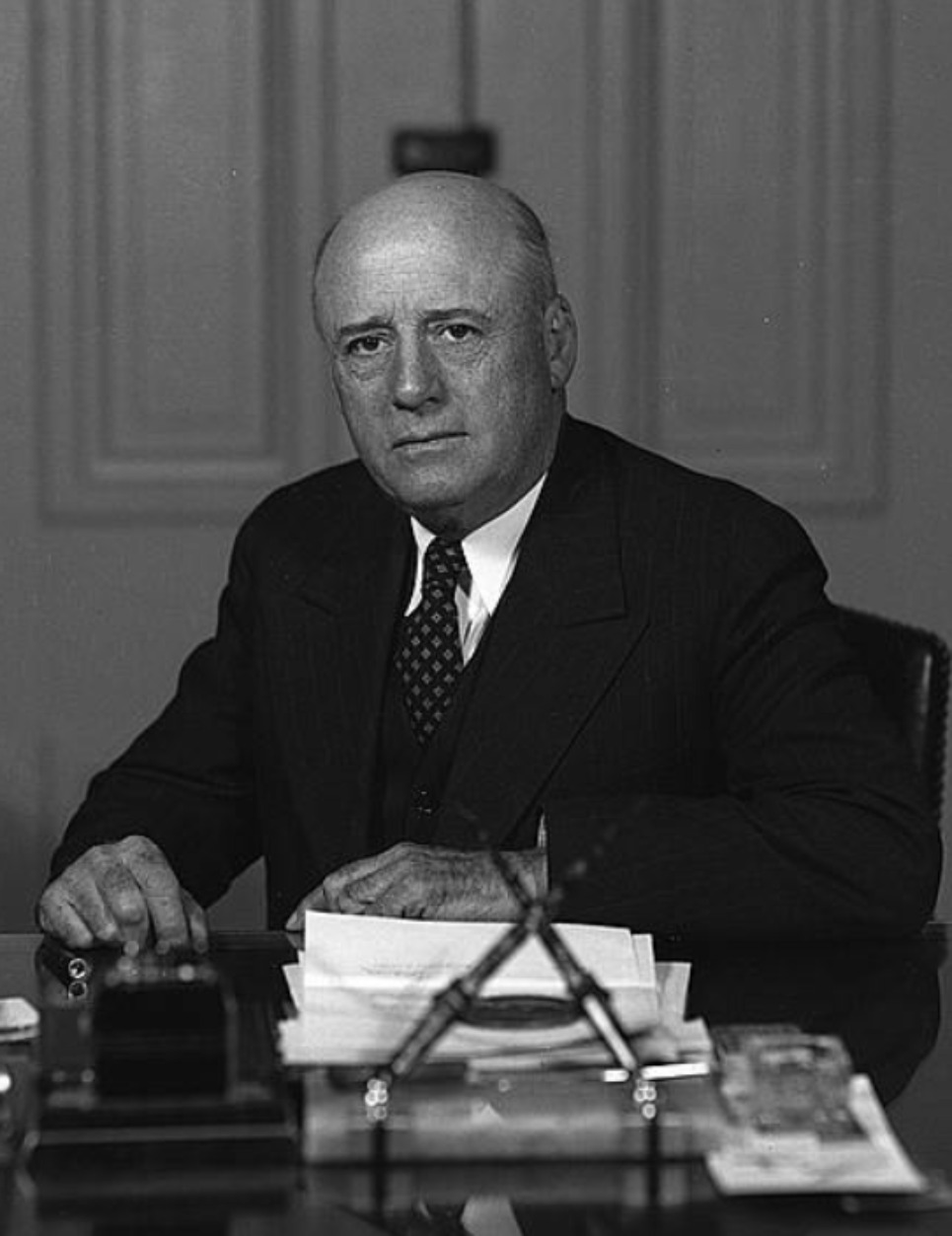
Sam Rayburn, longest serving speaker of the House, 17 years, 53 days (cumulative)

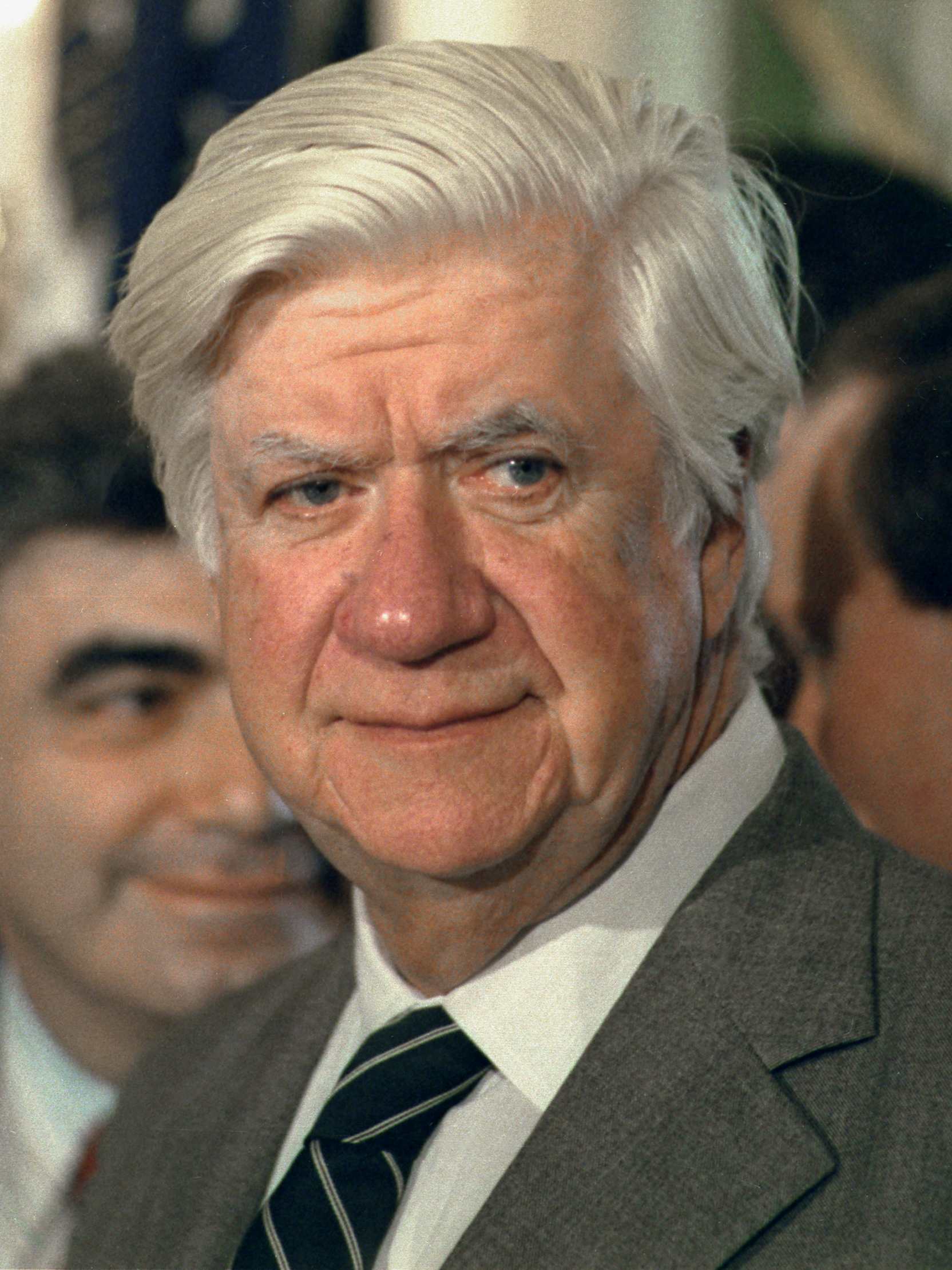
Tip O'Neill, longest uninterrupted tenure of office, 9 years, 350 days

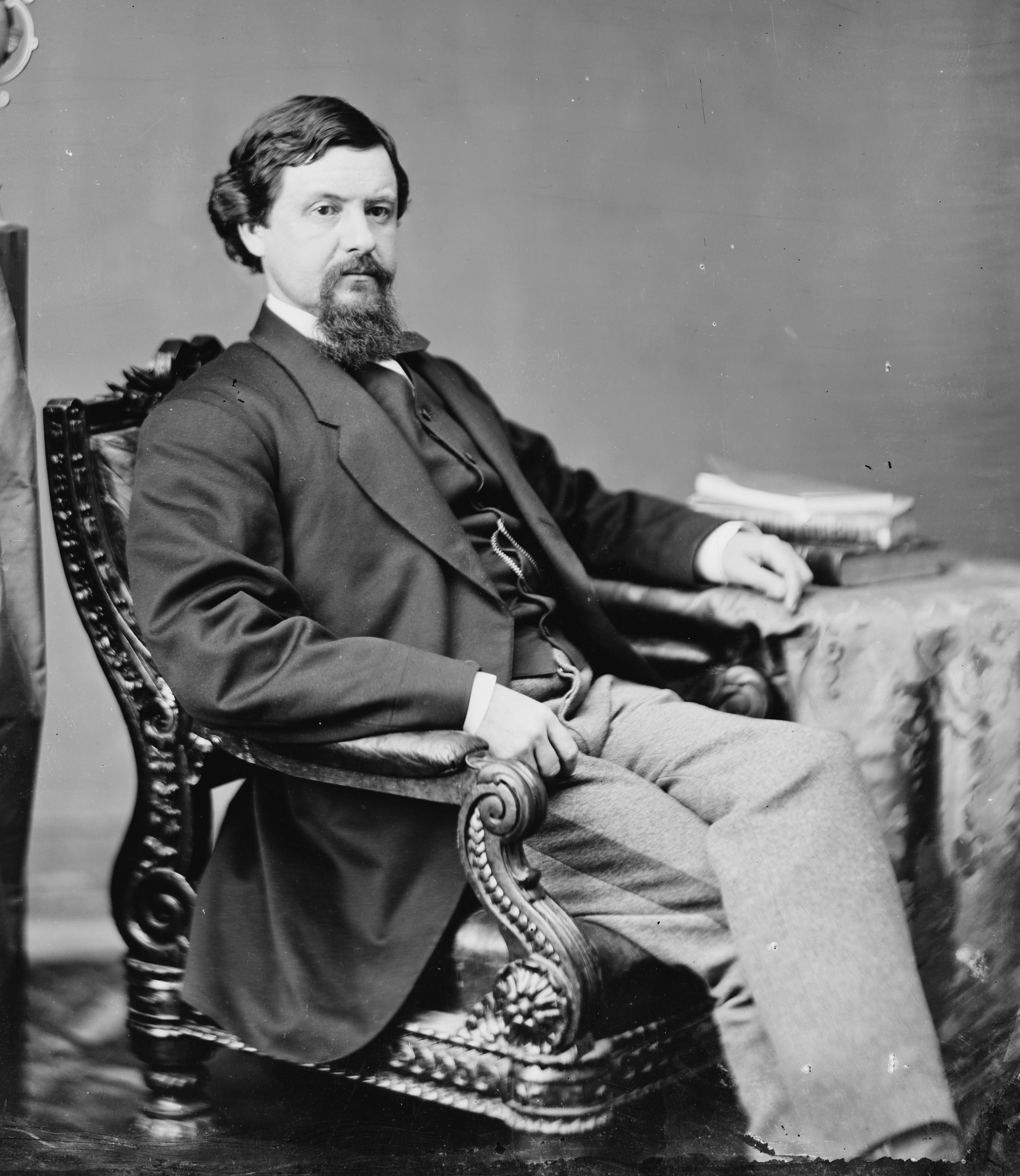
Theodore M. Pomeroy, shortest tenure of office, 1 day

Rank	Name	Time in office	TE	Year(s) in which elected
1	Sam Rayburn	17 years, 53 days	10	1940; 1941; 1943; 1945; 1949; 1951; 1955; 1957; 1959; 1961
2	Henry Clay	10 years, 196 days	6	1811; 1813; 1815; 1817; 1819; 1823
3	Tip O'Neill	9 years, 364 days	5	1977; 1979; 1981; 1983; 1985
4	John W. McCormack	8 years, 344 days	5	1962; 1963; 1965; 1967; 1969
5	Nancy Pelosi	7 years, 364 days	4	2007; 2009; 2019; 2021
6	Dennis Hastert	7 years, 359 days	4	1999; 2001; 2003; 2005
7	Champ Clark	7 years, 357 days	4	1911; 1913; 1915; 1917
8	Joseph Gurney Cannon	7 years, 286 days	4	1903; 1905; 1907; 1909
9	Carl Albert	5 years, 337 days	3	1971; 1973; 1975
10	Tom Foley	5 years, 209 days	3	1989; 1991; 1993
11	James G. Blaine	5 years, 93 days	3	1869; 1871; 1873
12	Frederick H. Gillett	4 years, 341 days	3	1919; 1921; 1923
13	John Boehner	4 years, 297 days	3	2011; 2013; 2015
14	Schuyler Colfax	4 years, 176 days	3	1863; 1865; 1867
15	Thomas Brackett Reed	4 years, 172 days	3	1889; 1895; 1897
16	Nicholas Longworth	4 years, 133 days	3	1925; 1927; 1929
17	William B. Bankhead	4 years, 102 days	3	1936; 1937; 1939
18	Andrew Stevenson	4 years, 83 days	4	1827; 1829; 1831; 1833
19	Joseph W. Martin Jr.	4 years	2	1947; 1953
20	Newt Gingrich	3 years, 361 days	2	1995; 1997
21	Nathaniel Macon	3 years, 317 days	3	1801; 1803; 1805
22	John G. Carlisle	3 years, 267 days	3	1883; 1885; 1887
23	Samuel J. Randall	3 years, 215 days	3	1876; 1877; 1879
24	Paul Ryan	3 years, 66 days	2	2015; 2017
25	Frederick Muhlenberg	3 years, 64 days	2	1789; 1793
26	Joseph Bradley Varnum	3 years, 49 days	2	1807; 1809
27	Mike Johnson	3 years, 21 days	2	2023; 2025
28	Jonathan Dayton	3 years, 14 days	2	1795; 1797
29	Charles Frederick Crisp	2 years, 295 days	2	1891; 1893
30	James K. Polk	2 years, 268 days	2	1835; 1837
31 (tie)	Linn Boyd	2 years, 182 days	2	1851; 1853
31 (tie)	David B. Henderson	2 years, 182 days	2	1899; 1901
33	Jim Wright	2 years, 151 days	2	1987; 1989
34	John White	1 year, 277 days	1	1841
35	Galusha A. Grow	1 year, 243 days	1	1861
36	John W. Taylor	1 year, 198 days	2	1820; 1825
37	Henry Thomas Rainey	1 year, 163 days	1	1933
38	Joseph W. Byrns Sr.	1 year, 153 days	1	1935
39	Jonathan Trumbull Jr.	1 year, 131 days	1	1791
40	John Wesley Davis	1 year, 93 days	1	1845
41	Theodore Sedgwick	1 year, 92 days	1	1799
42 (tie)	Philip P. Barbour	1 year, 90 days	1	1821
42 (tie)	John Winston Jones	1 year, 90 days	1	1843
44	J. Warren Keifer	1 year, 89 days	1	1881
45	Robert Charles Winthrop	1 year, 88 days	1	1847
46 (tie)	James Lawrence Orr	1 year, 87 days	1	1857
46 (tie)	John Nance Garner	1 year, 87 days	1	1931
48	Robert M. T. Hunter	1 year, 78 days	1	1839
49	Howell Cobb	1 year, 72 days	1	1849
50	Langdon Cheves	1 year, 44 days	1	1814
51	William Pennington	1 year, 31 days	1	1860
52	Nathaniel P. Banks	1 year, 30 days	1	1856
53	John Bell	275 days	1	1834
54	Kevin McCarthy	269 days	1	2023
55	Michael C. Kerr	257 days	1	1875
56	Theodore M. Pomeroy	1 day	1	1869

== See also ==
- List of Speaker of the United States House of Representatives elections
- Party leaders in the United States House of Representatives
- History of the United States House of Representatives
- List of current presidents of legislatures, presiding officers of legislative assemblies worldwide
