= 2015 Speaker of the United States House of Representatives election =

2015 Speaker of the United States House of Representatives election may refer to:

- January 2015 Speaker of the United States House of Representatives election
- October 2015 Speaker of the United States House of Representatives election
