= Daniel Webster (Florida politician) =

American politician (born 1949)

Dan Webster
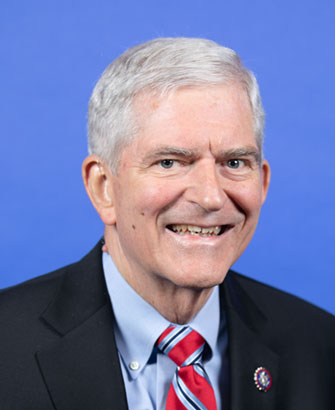
- Official portrait, 2023

Member of the U.S. House of Representatives from Florida
- Incumbent
- Assumed office January 3, 2011
- Preceded by: Alan Grayson
- Constituency: 8th district (2011–2013); 10th district (2013–2017); 11th district (2017–present)

Majority Leader of the Florida Senate
- In office November 2006 – November 4, 2008
- Preceded by: J. Alex Villalobos
- Succeeded by: Alex Díaz de la Portilla

Member of the Florida Senate
- In office November 3, 1998 – November 4, 2008
- Preceded by: John Ostalkiewicz
- Succeeded by: Andy Gardiner
- Constituency: 12th district (1998–2002); 9th district (2002–2008)

89th Speaker of the Florida House of Representatives
- In office November 19, 1996 – November 17, 1998
- Preceded by: Peter Wallace
- Succeeded by: John Thrasher

Member of the Florida House of Representatives
- In office November 4, 1980 – November 3, 1998
- Preceded by: John Mica
- Succeeded by: Randy Johnson
- Constituency: 39th district (1980–1982); 41st district (1982–1998)

Personal details
- Born: Daniel Alan Webster; April 27, 1949 (age 77) Charleston, West Virginia, U.S.
- Party: Republican
- Spouse: Sandra Jordan (m. 1972)
- Children: 6
- Education: Georgia Institute of Technology (BS)
- Website: House website Campaign website

Daniel Alan Webster (born April 27, 1949) is an American politician and businessman serving as the U.S. representative for Florida's 11th congressional district since 2017. A member of the Republican Party, he first entered Congress in 2011. He represented Florida's 10th congressional district from 2011 to 2017 (numbered as the 8th district during his first term). Before his federal congressional career, he served 28 years in the Florida legislature. He was the first Republican Speaker of the Florida House of Representatives since Reconstruction.

After receiving his engineering degree from the Georgia Institute of Technology, Webster worked in the family air conditioning and heating business he now owns and operates. He has been a resident of Florida since the age of seven and resides in Clermont. First elected to the Florida House of Representatives in 1980 and the Florida Senate in 1998, Webster is the longest-serving legislator in Florida history. He became Speaker of the Florida House of Representatives (1996–1998) and Florida Senate majority leader (2006–2008); he left the legislature after reaching the legal term limits. He ran unopposed in all of his elections for the state legislature except for the first three: 1980, 1982, and 1984.

Webster was first elected to the United States House of Representatives in 2010. He has since run three times for Speaker of the House: in January 2015, he received 12 votes; in October 2015, he received nine votes; in 2017, he received one vote. In the 115th United States Congress, Webster sat on the Transportation and Infrastructure Committee, the Natural Resources Committee and the Science, Space and Technology Committee.

== Early life, education, business career, and health ==
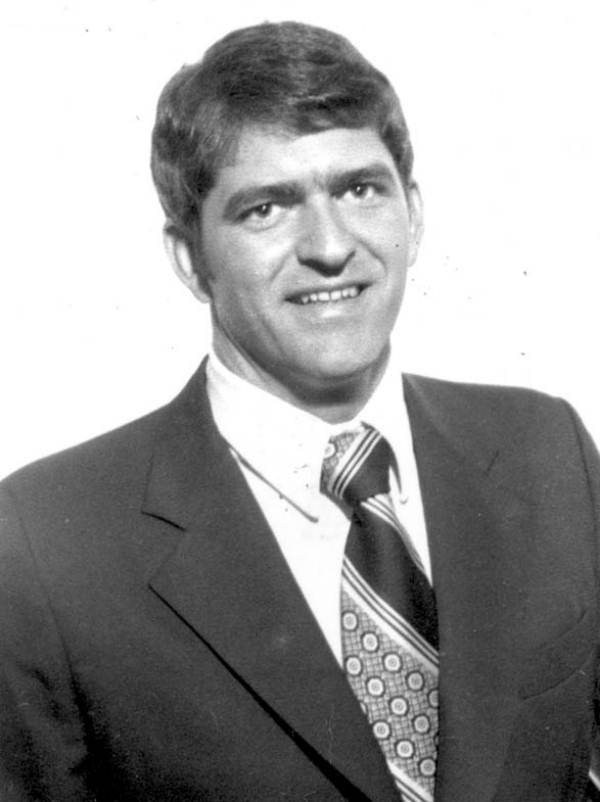
Webster as a member of the Florida State House in 1980

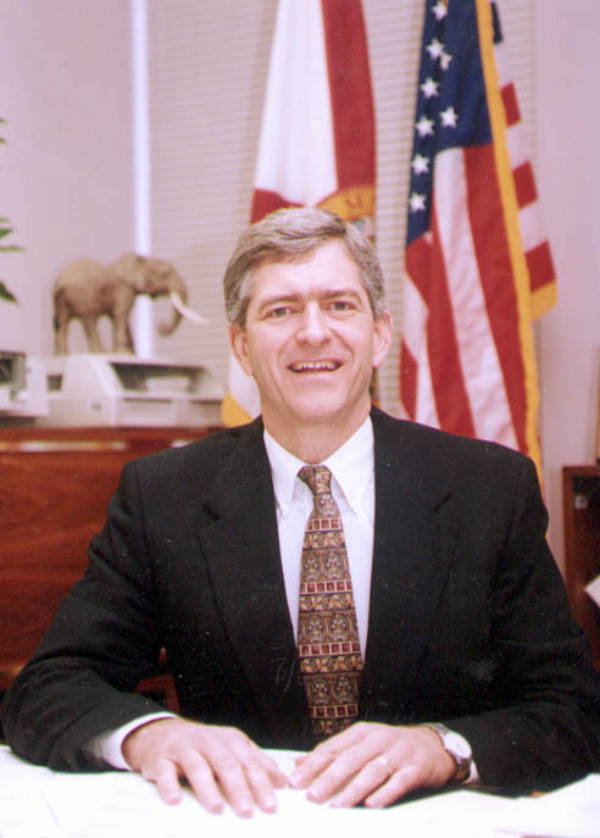
Webster as Speaker of the Florida State House

Webster was born in Charleston, West Virginia, the son of Mildred Rada (Schoolcraft), a nurse, and Dennis Webster. He was raised in Orlando, Florida, where his family moved when Webster was seven, upon a doctor's recommendation that a change of climate might cure Webster's sinus problems. He is reportedly a distant relative of the antebellum politician and orator Daniel Webster.

He attended the Georgia Institute of Technology, where he was student government chaplain from 1970 to 1971 and a member of the Tau Kappa Epsilon fraternity. He graduated in 1971 with a Bachelor of Science degree in electrical engineering. Upon graduation, Webster's Vietnam War student deferment expired, and he became eligible for conscription into the U.S. military, but was not drafted because he failed the physical exam due to lifelong foot problems that prevent him from standing for long periods.

Since college, Webster has worked in the family air conditioning and heating business; he presently owns and operates it. Webster lives in Clermont, Florida.

Webster said he and his wife faced health issues in 2021, which forced him to miss some votes. He said his wife had cancer surgery, and he had a pacemaker installed.

== Florida House of Representatives ==
=== Elections ===
Webster first ran for the Florida House in 1979 at age 30. He had been working on a project with his church to convert a residential house into a place for Sunday school to be conducted. When the Orange County commissioners rejected the church's request for a zoning exception, Webster investigated and found that the county commission had rejected every zoning exemption request brought before them by a church or religious organization. Seeking to rectify what he thought was an injustice, Webster ran for public office after finding no politician who shared his displeasure with local and statewide government.

In the Republican primary, Webster ranked first with 38%, short of the 50% necessary to avoid a runoff election. In the runoff, he defeated Barbara Owens, 54%–46%. In the general election, he defeated Democratic State Representative Henry Swanson 51%–49%, a difference of just 2,070 votes. The race came down to one precinct, Webster's own Pine Hills, which he won.

After redistricting, Webster ran in Florida's newly redrawn 41st House District in 1982. He was reelected, defeating Craig Crawford 58%–42%. In 1984, he was reelected to a third term over fellow State Representative Dick Batchelor, 54%–46%.

After defeating Batchelor in 1984, Webster never had another opponent in the State House of Representatives and was reelected unopposed every two years.

=== Tenure ===
Webster was first elected to the Florida House of Representatives in 1980. There, he served as Minority Floor Leader and then Minority Whip. In 1996, when the Republicans gained a majority in the House, Webster became the first Republican speaker of the Florida House in 122 years. He remained Speaker until 1998 when term limits made him ineligible to run for reelection.

During his tenure as Speaker of the Florida House of Representatives, Webster received recognition and awards from several organizations, including the American Heart Association for support of AHA priority issues (1996), the Board of Regents Legislative Award (1995), the Florida Association of State Troopers Leadership Award for Excellence in Legislative Leadership (1996), the Florida Banking Association Award (1995), the Florida Chamber of Commerce Legislator of the Year (1995), the Florida Farm Bureau Legislative Award (1995), the Florida Hotel and Motel Association Special Recognition Award (1995), the Florida League of Cities Quality Floridian (1995), the Florida Medical Association recognition award (1996), and the Republican Party of Florida Statesman of the Year award (1995).

Education

Webster's first bill to become law was the 1985 Home Education Program Act, which legalized homeschooling in Florida. He considers it his most significant legislation. He homeschooled his six children, remains a homeschooling advocate, and a member of a non-denominational Christian organization that promotes homeschooling, the Institute in Basic Life Principles. While Speaker of the House in 1997, Webster insisted that legislation providing funding to schools must balance the needs of all school districts and not raise any taxes. He agreed to a school construction plan funded by borrowing up to $2.5 billion in bonds. However, he thought the crowding problem was being exaggerated for political purposes. He also sponsored 1998 legislation to improve and streamline pre-kindergarten education and provide training for parents who homeschooled their children.

Marriage

In 1990, Webster sponsored and supported legislation in Florida introducing the policy of covenant marriage. This would make divorce between even two consenting individuals much harder, except in cases of infidelity.

=== Committee assignments ===
- House Transportation Committee (Ranking Member)

== Florida Senate ==
=== Elections ===
Webster ran unopposed for the Florida Senate in Florida's 12th and 9th Senate Districts. He served until reaching the term limit in 2008.

=== Tenure ===
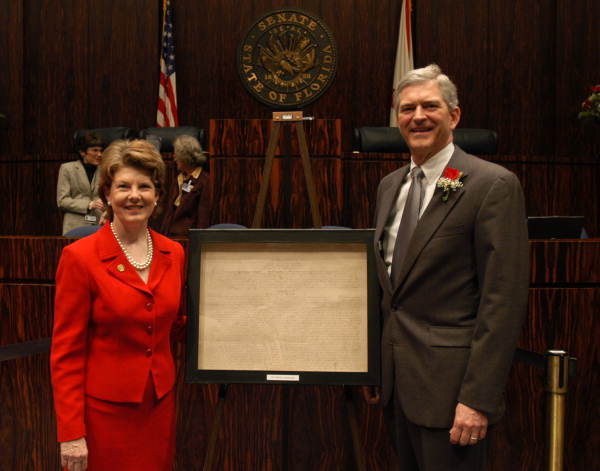
Webster and Glenda Hood with the 1838 Florida Constitution in the Senate chamber, March 2004

In 2002, Webster unsuccessfully tried for the position of Senate president. From 2006 to 2008, he served as Senate Majority Leader. In 2006, while Majority Leader of the Florida Senate, he received the Florida Family Policy Council Award (2006).

The Florida Department of Transportation Turnpike District Headquarters was named the "Senator Daniel Webster Building" in 2008, and in 2005 State Road 429 was designated the "Daniel Webster Western Beltway". In addition, the largest committee room in the Florida House was named "Speaker Daniel Webster Hall" in his honor in 2008.

Drugs

In 2007, Webster attached an amendment to a bill for steroid testing of high school athletes that would have created an oversight body for private school athletes separate from the Florida High School Athletic Association. He said the provision was in response to complaints from private schools that had been allegedly singled out for recruiting violations.

Abortion

In 2008, Webster sponsored SB 2400 in the Florida Senate, requiring that all women planning to undergo an abortion receive an ultrasound, but giving them a choice of whether to see the live images of the fetus. He argued that it would give women more medical information before receiving an abortion, and said if that changed some women's minds, it would make him happy. Opponents said the measure would be an invasion of privacy. The bill did not pass the Senate then, but later became law. He also sponsored a law that would have required minors to notify their legal guardians before receiving an abortion. It has been alleged that Webster does not believe in the right to have an abortion following rape or incest. When questioned by a reporter on the topic, Webster declines to comment. He eventually said that this was an issue being used to distract from the real problem, which was that "Washington is broken."

Schiavo case

Webster was a central figure in the Terri Schiavo case, which involved a dispute between relatives on whether to remove the feeding tube of an unconscious woman who had been in a persistent vegetative state for years. In March 2005, he introduced SB 804, which would have prohibited such patients from being denied food and water if family members disagreed with the patient's wishes and if the patient had not expressed their wishes in writing when competent. The bill failed to pass the Senate by three votes.

=== Committee assignments ===
He also chaired the Senate Judiciary Committee.

== U.S. House of Representatives ==
=== Elections ===
==== 2010 ====
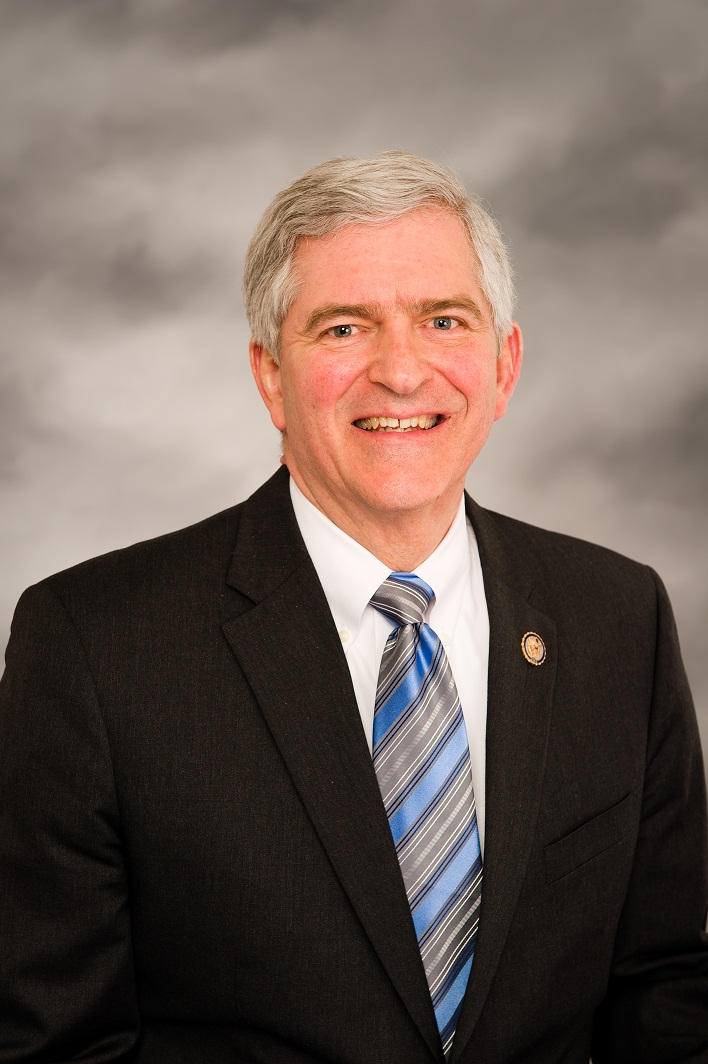
Webster's official House portrait, 2011.

Webster rejected early suggestions by several leaders in the Republican Party of Florida that he run to represent Florida's 8th congressional district in the U.S. House of Representatives. Still, in April 2010, he changed his mind and entered the race. His name recognition and an endorsement from former governor of Florida Jeb Bush quickly made him the front-runner. He was further aided by a late endorsement and campaign rally from former governor of Arkansas Mike Huckabee. On August 24, 2010, Webster defeated six other candidates in the Republican primary, winning nomination with 40% of the vote, to the runner-up's 23%. Webster was named one of 52 "Young Guns" of the National Republican Congressional Committee's Young Guns Program, those the party viewed as serious contenders in their races.

The campaign featured ads by opponent Alan Grayson that criticized Webster's conservative religious views on marriage and abortion as well as attack ads against Grayson financed by Americans for Prosperity and the 60 Plus Association.

In July 2010, Webster signed a pledge sponsored by Americans for Prosperity promising to "oppose legislation relating to climate change that includes a net increase in government revenue."

On November 2, 2010, Webster won the seat, 56% to 38%. Three other candidates were on the ballot: Independent George Metcalfe, Florida Whig Party candidate Steve Gerritzen, and Peg Dunmire of the Florida TEA Party.

==== 2012 ====
Due to redistricting, Webster ran for reelection in the 10th district. Webster defeated Val Demings, the former Chief of Police of the Orlando Police Department, 52% to 48%.

==== 2014 ====
Webster faced former Navy chief petty officer Mike McKenna, a Walt Disney World security officer. McKenna had a minimal budget and ran a door-to-door campaign. Webster was reelected, 62% to 38%.

==== 2016 ====
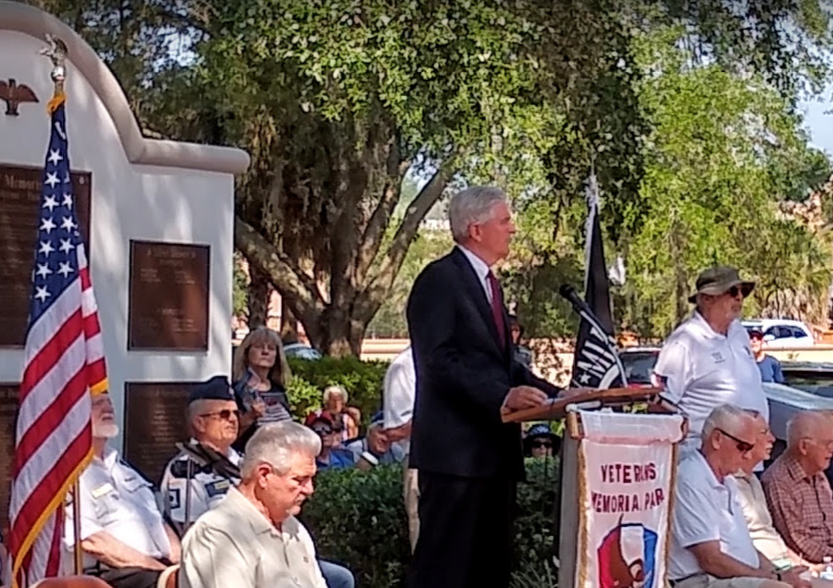
Representative Daniel Webster speaks on Memorial Day at Veterans Memorial Park in The Villages, Florida.

Due to a series of court-ordered re-drawings that made the 10th substantially more Democratic, Webster announced he would run in the 11th district instead. The district's incumbent, fellow Republican Rich Nugent, was retiring. Webster had previously represented much of the redrawn 11th's eastern portion, around Ocala and the Villages. He opted to maintain his residence in Clermont, within the borders of the 10th; members of Congress are required only to live in the state they wish to represent. Webster won the Republican primary 60%–40% over Justin Grabelle. He defeated Democratic nominee Dave Koller, 65%–32%.

==== 2018 ====
Webster ran for reelection in 2018 for the 11th District. No Republican candidates opposed Webster, so he advanced to the general election. Webster defeated Democratic nominee Dana Cottrell, 65%–35%.

==== 2020 ====
Webster ran for reelection in 2020 for the 11th District. No Republican candidates opposed Webster, so he advanced to the general election, again defeating Cottrell by a similar margin (67%–33%).

==== 2022 ====
Webster ran for reelection in 2022 for the 11th District. The boundaries of the district were redrawn by the 2020 redistricting cycle. The 11th was pushed to the east to grab part of Orange County. The reconfigured district included Webster's new home in Winter Garden, and was described as "Safe R" or "Solid R" by numerous outlets. Webster faced a primary challenger in far-right activist Laura Loomer. Webster managed to hold off the challenge and won the nomination by a close margin of 51%–44%. In the general election, Webster easily defeated Democrat Shante Munns by 63%–35%.

=== Missed votes ===
Webster has missed 5.2% of roll-call votes during his tenure in Congress, which is worse than the median of 1.9% for members serving in Congress, according to GovTrack, a nonpartisan government watchdog group.

Webster did not vote on President Donald Trump's second impeachment.

Webster did not vote on H.Res 503, the measure that established the January 6 Select Committee.

=== Tenure ===
Webster's main platform in the 2010 election was a call for smaller, streamlined government, spending cuts, budget roll backs, and tax cuts. He also said he would increase the protection of personal rights and encourage financial responsibility in the federal government. Webster predicted that if Republicans took back Congress, "we would have the opportunity for turning this country around." In the January 2015 vote for Speaker of the House, Webster received the second-most Republican votes.

On September 28, 2015, Webster announced that he was running again for Speaker of the House to replace John Boehner. He received 43 votes in the House GOP Conference. Still, most members of the Freedom Caucus who voted for him in conference honored their pledge to support Ryan on the House floor, and Webster received nine votes in the final tally.

Despite not being a candidate in the 2017 speakership election, Webster received one vote from Thomas Massie of Kentucky.

In April 2026, Webster announced his retirement from Congress following the 2026 United States elections, explaining that "the time has come to pass the torch to the next conservative leader".

=== Committee assignments ===
For the 118th Congress:

- Committee on Natural Resources
  - Subcommittee on Energy and Mineral Resources
  - Subcommittee on Water, Wildlife and Fisheries
- Committee on Science, Space, and Technology
  - Subcommittee on Space and Aeronautics
- Committee on Transportation and Infrastructure
  - Subcommittee on Coast Guard and Maritime Transportation (Chairman)
  - Subcommittee on Highways and Transit
  - Subcommittee on Water Resources and Environment

== 2004 U.S. Senate election ==
Webster briefly ran for the United States Senate in 2004 when he attempted to collect the 93,000 signatures necessary to place his name on the ballot without paying the filing fee. Webster claimed that he sought to be the first Senate candidate to ever qualify by this method as a symbolic gesture and a way to build an early network of voters. He eventually qualified by paying the fee instead and later dropped out of the race.

When Mel Martinez resigned from the United States Senate, it fell upon Governor Charlie Crist to name a replacement to finish out his Senate term. Webster was floated early on as one of seven potential candidates. In the end, George LeMieux was selected for the position.

== Political positions ==
=== Education ===
Webster is an advocate for home schooling.

=== Gun law ===
Webster supports allowing gun owners to carry concealed firearms across state lines where concealed carry is legal. In 2017, he voted for H.J.Res.40, which successfully used the Congressional Review Act to block implementation of an Obama-era amendment to the NICS Improvement Amendments Act of 2007 that was aimed at preventing the mentally impaired from legally purchasing firearms.

In 2015–2016, Webster accepted $1,000 in direct campaign contributions from the NRA Political Victory Fund. From 2004 to 2018, he accepted $37,881 from NRA sources. Webster has an "A" rating from the NRA, generally indicating a voting record that supports gun rights.

=== LGBT rights ===
Webster has a "0" rating from the Human Rights Campaign regarding his voting record on LGBT-related matters. He co-sponsored the First Amendment Defense Act. He does not support same-sex marriage.

=== Social issues ===
==== Abortion ====
Webster opposes abortion under all circumstances.

=== Tax reform ===
Webster voted for the Tax Cuts and Jobs Act of 2017. He believes the current tax code is "punishing taxpayers" and is broken. He says the 2017 act "allows Americans to keep more money in their pockets, ends lobbyist loopholes and special-interest exemptions, and makes everyone play by the same rules." He says "the majority" of his constituents will be "among the biggest winners in the nation" due to the new tax policies.

=== Veterans ===
Webster voted against the Honoring our PACT Act of 2022 which expanded VA benefits to veterans exposed to toxic chemicals during their military service.

=== Donald Trump ===
==== Texas v. Pennsylvania ====
In December 2020, Webster was one of 126 Republican members of the House of Representatives to sign an amicus brief in support of Texas v. Pennsylvania, a lawsuit filed at the United States Supreme Court contesting the results of the 2020 presidential election, in which Joe Biden defeated incumbent Donald Trump. The Supreme Court declined to hear the case on the basis that Texas lacked standing under Article III of the Constitution to challenge the results of an election held by another state.

House Speaker Nancy Pelosi issued a statement that called signing the amicus brief an act of "election subversion." She also reprimanded Webster and the other House members who supported the lawsuit: "The 126 Republican Members that signed onto this lawsuit brought dishonor to the House. Instead of upholding their oath to support and defend the Constitution, they chose to subvert the Constitution and undermine public trust in our sacred democratic institutions." New Jersey Representative Bill Pascrell, citing section three of the 14th Amendment, called for Pelosi to not seat Webster and the other Republicans who signed the brief supporting the suit, arguing that "the text of the 14th Amendment expressly forbids Members of Congress from engaging in rebellion against the United States. Trying to overturn a democratic election and install a dictator seems like a pretty clear example of that."

==== Second impeachment ====
Webster did not cast a vote regarding the second impeachment of Donald Trump on January 13, 2021, due to a "family medical obligation".

== Personal life ==
Webster is a Southern Baptist and attends First Baptist Church of Central Florida. He is on the University of Central Florida board of trustees. He and his wife, Sandra E. "Sandy" (Jordan) Webster, have six children. As of 2026, they have 24 grandchildren.

The Websters home-schooled their children using the curriculum of the Advanced Training Institute, founded by Bill Gothard. In May 2014, their son John married Alyssa Bates, daughter of Gil and Kelly Bates. The Bates family starred in the reality show Bringing Up Bates and were recurring guests on the show 19 Kids and Counting, which depicted the lives of their friends, Jim Bob Duggar and his wife Michelle.

Political offices
| Preceded by Peter Wallace | Speaker of the Florida House of Representatives; 1996–1998 | Succeeded by John Thrasher |
Florida Senate
| Preceded by J. Alex Villalobos | Majority Leader of the Florida Senate; 2006–2008 | Succeeded by Alex Díaz de la Portilla |
U.S. House of Representatives
| Preceded by Alan Grayson | Member of the U.S. House of Representatives from Florida's 8th congressional district 2011–2013 | Succeeded by Bill Posey |
| Preceded by Bill Young | Member of the U.S. House of Representatives from Florida's 10th congressional district 2013–2017 | Succeeded by Val Demings |
| Preceded by Rich Nugent | Member of the U.S. House of Representatives from Florida's 11th congressional district 2017–present | Incumbent |
U.S. order of precedence (ceremonial)
| Preceded by Terri Sewell | United States representatives by seniority 90th | Succeeded by Frederica Wilson |
