= January 2015 Speaker of the United States House of Representatives election =

- January 6, 2015

Needed to win: Majority of the votes cast 408 votes cast, 205 needed for a majority
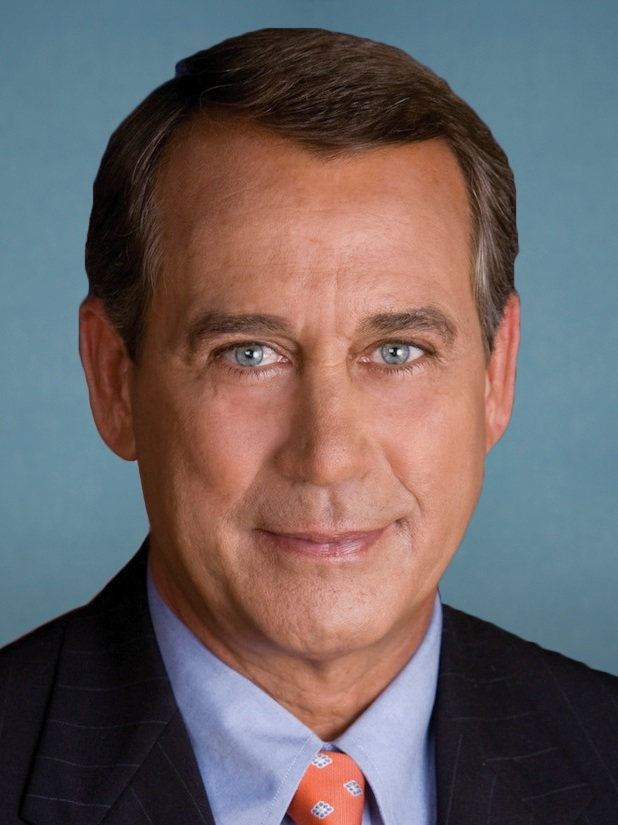

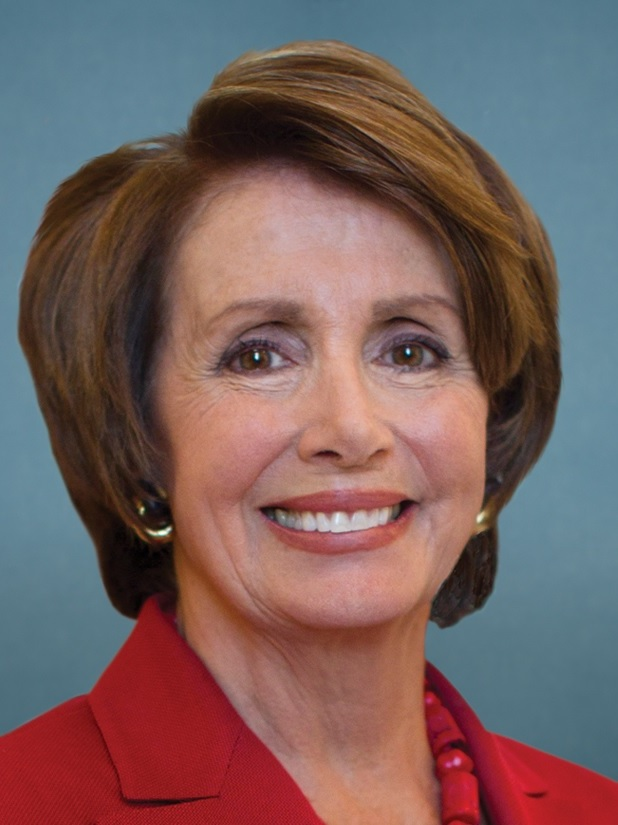

	Majority party	Minority party
Candidate	John Boehner	Nancy Pelosi
Party	Republican	Democratic
Leader's seat	Ohio 8th	California 12th
Members' vote	216	164
Percentage	52.94%	40.20%
Candidate	Others
Members' vote	28
Percentage	6.86%
Speaker before election
John Boehner
Republican
Elected Speaker
John Boehner
Republican

On January 6, 2015, the first day of the 114th United States Congress and two months after the 2014 U.S. House elections, the incoming House members held an election for its speaker. This was the 123rd speaker election since the office was created in 1789. The incumbent, John Boehner, received 216 votes, a majority of the votes cast and was re-elected to office, despite a coordinated effort by Freedom Caucus Republicans to oust him.

Immediately after the election, the dean of the United States House of Representatives, John Conyers, administered the oath of office to the speaker. Boehner in turn administered the oath of office en masse to the rest of the members of the House. He resigned later that same year, triggering a speaker election in October.

== Nominations ==
The House Republicans met on November 13, 2014, and unanimously renominated John Boehner for the speakership of the House of Representatives. Representative Cathy McMorris Rodgers, the Chair of the House Republican Conference, placed Boehner's name in nomination on January 6, 2015.

The House Democrats, who met on November 18, 2014, chose unopposed Nancy Pelosi through a voice vote as the Minority Leader as well as nominee for speaker. Her name was placed in nomination on January 6, 2015, by Xavier Becerra, the Chair of the House Democratic Caucus.

On January 6, 2015, after House Republican Conference Chair Cathy McMorris Rodgers nominated John Boehner and House Democratic Caucus Chair Xavier Becerra nominated Nancy Pelosi for the office of the speaker on behalf of their respective parties, three more names were placed in nominations by some of the Republican representatives. Ted Yoho of Florida was nominated by Thomas Massie of Kentucky, Louie Gohmert of Texas by Jim Bridenstine of Oklahoma, and Dan Webster of Florida by Steve King of Iowa.

== Republican dissent ==
Republican lawmakers took to social media to find support for a new speaker of the House. On January 6, Randy Weber tweeted support for Louis Gohmert in an attempt to take votes from John Boehner. Justin Amash went on Facebook to rally for support for a new candidate. He stated that the Republican Majority in Congress would have more leverage against Barack Obama with a new speaker. Thomas Massie of Kentucky told reporters they wanted to push to vote to a second ballot. A second ballot for the speaker of the House was last needed in 1923, and would not be needed again until 2023.

== Election of the speaker ==
The vote count in the January 6, 2015, speaker of the House election was:

2015 election for speaker (regular) – 114th Congress * denotes incumbent
Party	Candidate	Votes	%
Republican	John Boehner* (OH 8)	216	52.95
Democratic	Nancy Pelosi (CA 12)	164	40.20
Republican	Dan Webster (FL 10)	12	2.95
Republican	Louie Gohmert (TX 1)	3	0.74
Republican	Ted Yoho (FL 3)	2	0.50
Republican	Jim Jordan (OH 4)	2	0.50
Republican	Jeff Duncan (SC 3)	1	0.24
Republican	Rand Paul	1	0.24
Republican	Colin Powell	1	0.24
Republican	Trey Gowdy (SC 4)	1	0.24
Republican	Kevin McCarthy (CA 23)	1	0.24
Democratic	Jim Cooper (TN 5)	1	0.24
Democratic	Peter DeFazio (OR 4)	1	0.24
Republican	Jeff Sessions	1	0.24
Democratic	John Lewis (GA 5)	1	0.24
Total votes		408	100
Votes necessary		205	>50

Boehner did not cast a vote in the election, while Pelosi did.

Representatives voting for someone other than their party's speaker nominee were:
■ Rod Blum of Iowa; Scott Garrett of New Jersey; Paul Gosar of Arizona; Tim Huelskamp of Kansas; Walter Jones of North Carolina; Steve King of Iowa; Mark Meadows of North Carolina; Rich Nugent of Florida; Bill Posey of Florida; Scott Rigell of Virginia; Marlin Stutzman of Indiana; and Daniel Webster of Florida voted for Daniel Webster;
■ Jim Bridenstine of Oklahoma; Louie Gohmert of Texas; and Randy Weber of Texas voted for Louie Gohmert;
■ Thomas Massie of Kentucky and Ted Yoho of Florida voted for Ted Yoho;
■ Justin Amash of Michigan and Scott DesJarlais of Tennessee voted for Jim Jordan;
■ Gwen Graham of Florida voted for Jim Cooper;
■ Dan Lipinski of Illinois voted for Peter DeFazio;
■ Dave Brat of Virginia voted for Jeff Duncan;
■ Jeff Duncan of South Carolina voted for Trey Gowdy;
■ Kyrsten Sinema of Arizona voted for John Lewis;
■ Chris Gibson of New York voted for Kevin McCarthy;
■ Curt Clawson of Florida voted for Rand Paul, who was not a member of the House at the time;
■ Gary Palmer of Alabama voted for Jeff Sessions, who was not a member of the House at the time;
■ Jim Cooper of Tennessee voted for Colin Powell, who was not a member of the House at the time.

On the day of the election, January 6, there were a total of 434 representatives in office, Michael Grimm of New York having resigned from his seat, and Boehner would have needed at least 218 votes to win had all of them voted. However, 26 representatives did not participate in the voting, including 13 New York Democrats who attended the funeral of the late former New York Governor Mario Cuomo that day. Inclement weather also stopped some politicians from traveling for the vote. As a result, the number of votes necessary for a majority was lower, 205 rather than 218.
