= 2017 Speaker of the United States House of Representatives election =

- January 3, 2017

Needed to win: Majority of the votes cast 433 votes cast, 217 needed for a majority
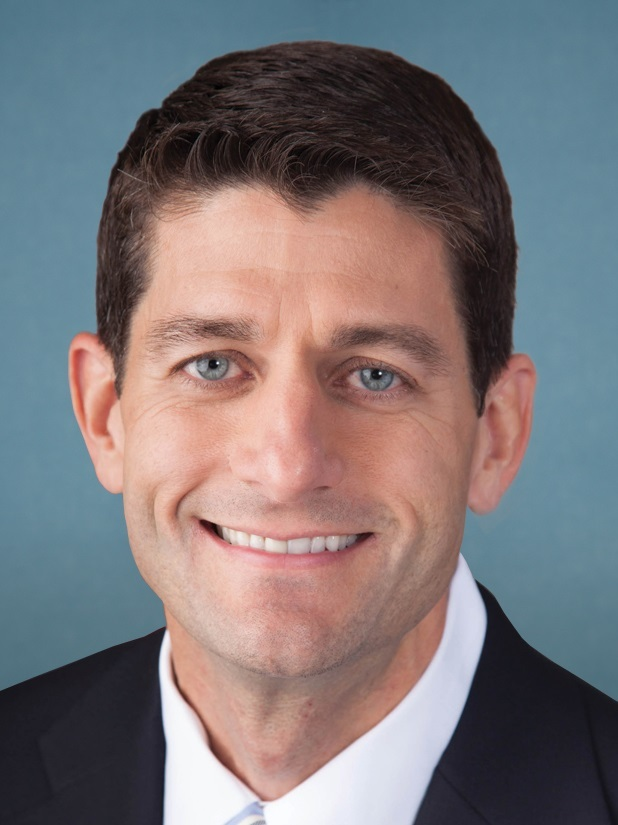

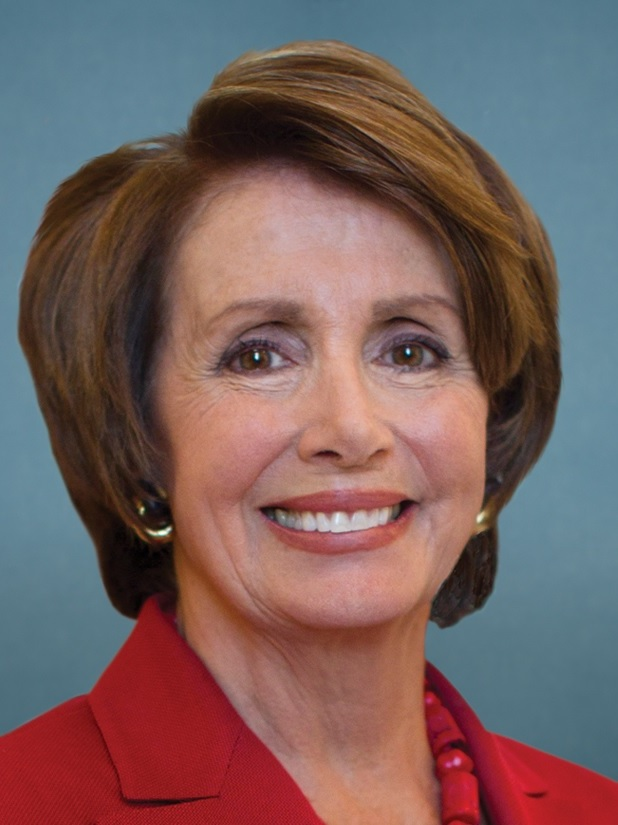

	Majority party	Minority party
Candidate	Paul Ryan	Nancy Pelosi
Party	Republican	Democratic
Leader's seat	Wisconsin 1st	California 23rd
Members' vote	239	189
Percentage	55.19%	43.65%
Candidate	Others
Members' vote	5
Percentage	1.15%
Speaker before election
Paul Ryan
Republican
Elected Speaker
Paul Ryan
Republican

On January 3, 2017, the first day of the 115th United States Congress and two months after the 2016 U.S. House elections, the incoming members of the U.S. House of Representatives held an election for speaker of the U.S. House of Representatives. This was the 125th U.S. speaker election since the office was created in 1789.

The, incumbent speaker House Republican leader Paul Ryan, received 239 votes, a majority of the chamber, and retained the speakership. House Democratic leader Nancy Pelosi garnered 189 votes, with 5 more votes going to a scattering of others. As only 433 representatives in the 435-member House cast a vote (with two members not casting votes), 217 votes were necessary in order to win.

== Process and conventions ==
The speaker of the United States House of Representatives is the presiding officer of the United States House of Representatives. The House elects its speaker at the beginning of a new Congress (i.e. biennially, after a general election) or when a speaker dies, resigns or is removed from the position intra-term. Since 1839, the House has elected speakers by roll call vote. Traditionally, each party's caucus or conference selects a candidate for the speakership from among its senior leaders prior to the roll call. Representatives are not restricted to voting for the candidate nominated by their party, but generally do, as the outcome of the election effectively determines which party has the majority and consequently will organize the House. Representatives that choose to vote for someone other than their party's nominated candidate usually vote for another member within the party or vote "present".

Moreover, as the Constitution does not explicitly state that the speaker must be an incumbent member of the House, it is permissible for representatives to vote for someone who is not a member of the House at the time, and non-members have received a few votes in various speaker elections over the past several years. Nevertheless, every person elected speaker has been a member.

To be elected speaker, a candidate must receive an absolute majority of the votes cast, as opposed to an absolute majority of the full membership of the House – presently 218 votes, in a House of 435. There have only been a few instances during the past century where a person received a majority of the votes cast, and thus won the election, while failing to obtain a majority of the full membership. At the time, it happened most recently in January 2015 (114th Congress), when John Boehner was elected with 216 votes (as opposed to 218). Such a variation in the number of votes necessary to win a given election might arise due to vacancies, absentees, or members being present but not voting. If no candidate wins a majority of the "votes cast for a person by name," then the roll call is repeated until a speaker is elected. Multiple roll calls have previously been needed only once since the American Civil War; they last occurred in 1923 and would not occur again until 2023. Upon winning election the new speaker is immediately sworn in by the Dean of the United States House of Representatives, the chamber's longest-serving member.

== Democratic nomination ==
Nancy Pelosi of California and Tim Ryan of Ohio ran in the House Democratic Caucus's vote to select its leader and nominee for speaker. Pelosi had led the House Democratic Caucus since 2003. There had also been some who had urged Joe Crowley of New York to challenge Pelosi, but he instead opted to run for the position of House Democratic Caucus chairman, which was being vacated by outgoing congressman Xavier Becerra.

The result of the November 30, 2016 vote was:

Candidate	Votes	Percent
Nancy Pelosi	134	68.02%
Tim Ryan	63	31.98%

Ryan's share of the vote was seen as indicating a degree of disapproval within the House Democratic Caucus towards Pelosi's leadership.

== Republican nomination ==
On November 15, 2016, incumbent speaker Paul Ryan was renominated by the House Republican Conference without opposition.

Candidate	Votes	Percent
Paul Ryan	—	100%

== Election of the speaker ==
2017 United States Speaker of the United States House of Representatives election
Party	Candidate	Votes	%
Republican	Paul Ryan (WI 1) (incumbent)	239	55.19
Democratic	Nancy Pelosi (CA 12)	189	43.65
Democratic	Tim Ryan (OH 13)	2	0.47
Democratic	Jim Cooper (TN 5)	1	0.23
Democratic	John Lewis (GA 5)	1	0.23
Republican	Dan Webster (FL 10)	1	0.23
Total votes		433	100
Votes necessary		217	>50

Ryan did not cast a vote in the election, while Pelosi did.

Representatives voting for someone other than their party's speaker nominee were:
■ Thomas Massie of Kentucky, who voted for Webster
■Jim Cooper of Tennessee and Kathleen Rice of New York, who voted for Tim Ryan
■Ron Kind of Wisconsin, who voted for Jim Cooper
■Kyrsten Sinema of Arizona, who voted for Lewis

Representatives that did not cast votes were:
■ Paul Ryan of Wisconsin
■Kurt Schrader of Oregon
