= NICS Improvement Amendments Act of 2007 =

The NICS Improvement Amendments Act (Pub. L. 110–180 (text) (PDF)) was passed in 2007 in the wake of the Virginia Tech shootings in order to address loopholes in the National Instant Criminal Background Check System, commonly known as NICS, which enabled Seung-Hui Cho to buy firearms despite having been ruled a danger to himself by a Virginia court.

Under the Gun Control Act of 1968, it was illegal for Cho to purchase the firearms; however, the Commonwealth of Virginia had not submitted his disqualifying mental health adjudication to NICS, which failed to deny the sale.

== 2017 ==
In February 2017, the Trump administration signed into law a bill that rolled back a regulation implemented by the Obama administration, which would have prohibited approximately 75,000 individuals who were receiving Social Security disability and had representative payees, from owning guns. The initial regulation was strongly opposed by the ACLU, the National Alliance on Mental Illness, the National Association for Mental Health, The American Association of People with Disabilities, and the National Council on Disability, the Consortium for Citizens with Disabilities, as well as other disability rights advocates. The initial regulation was supported by the Brady Campaign to Stop Gun Violence, Moms Demand Action Against Gun Violence, Democratic gun control advocates, and some mental health experts.

== See also ==
- Gun politics in the United States
- Gun Control Act of 1968
- Brady Handgun Violence Prevention Act of 1993
