= October 2015 Speaker of the United States House of Representatives election =

- October 29, 2015

Needed to win: Majority of the votes cast 432 votes cast, 217 needed for a majority
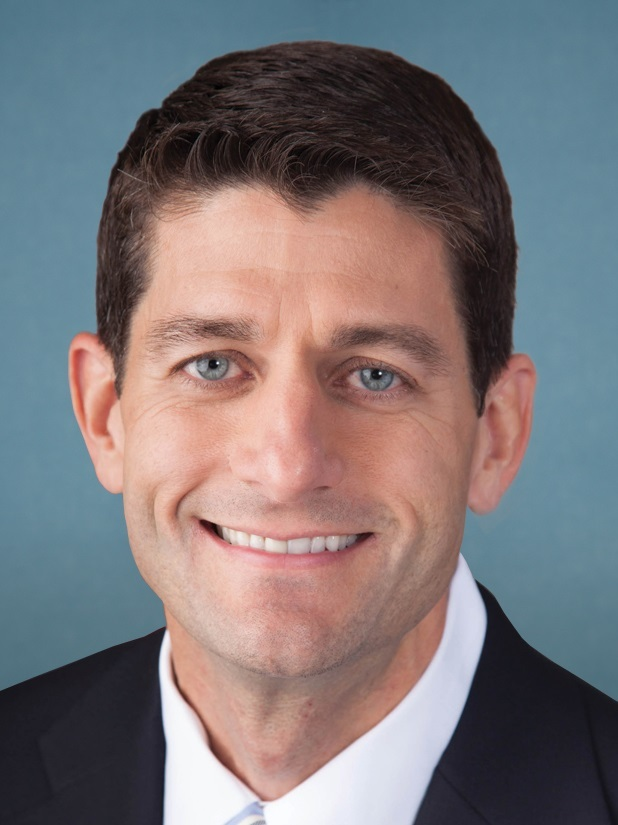

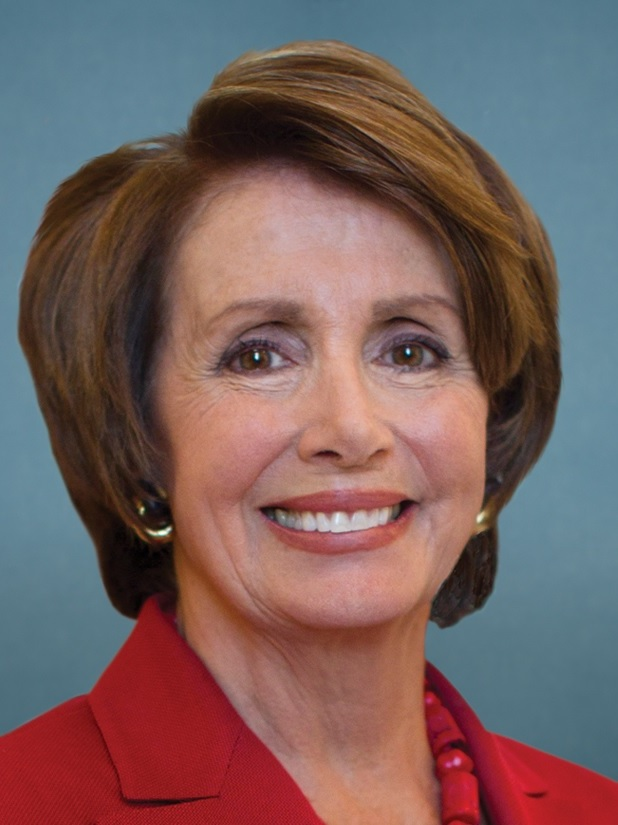

	Majority party	Minority party
Candidate	Paul Ryan	Nancy Pelosi
Party	Republican	Democratic
Leader's seat	Wisconsin 1st	California 12th
Members' vote	236	184
Percentage	54.63%	42.59%
Candidate	Others
Members' vote	12
Percentage	2.78%
Speaker before election
John Boehner
Republican
Elected Speaker
Paul Ryan
Republican

On October 29, 2015, during the 114th United States Congress, an election for speaker of the U.S. House of Representatives was necessitated by the impending resignation of John Boehner, set for October 30. Boehner was the first speaker to resign in the middle of a Congressional term since Jim Wright in 1989.

This was 124th speaker of the House election since the office was created in 1789. Republican representative Paul Ryan, the chairman of the Ways and Means Committee, won the election, receiving 236 votes, an absolute majority of the 435-member chamber. Democrat Nancy Pelosi, the House Minority Leader, garnered 184 votes, with 12 more going to others. As 432 representatives cast a vote, the majority needed to win was 217. Ryan (age 45) was the youngest person elected as speaker since James G. Blaine (age 39) in 1869. After the vote, Ryan delivered his first remarks as speaker-elect and was sworn in by John Conyers, the dean of the House.

Boehner had been speaker since January 5, 2011, and during his tenure had managed substantial friction within the House Republican Conference, most notably several high-profile disputes with the Freedom Caucus. On September 25, 2015, Boehner announced his decision to resign as speaker and from Congress. He scheduled a Republican Conference non-binding vote for speaker on October 8, and a full floor vote on October 29.

Several Republicans expressed interest in becoming speaker. Kevin McCarthy, the House Majority Leader was initially viewed as the favorite, but withdrew his name from consideration on October 8, when the Freedom Caucus refused to support him, and the conference vote was postponed. Immediately afterwards, an effort was made to recruit the widely respected Paul Ryan, who had been the 2012 Republican vice presidential candidate, for the post; but he had repeatedly insisted that he was not interested in the job. However, after receiving pledges of support from each of the various party factions, Ryan declared his candidacy. The several other Republicans interested in running for speaker promptly endorsed Ryan; only Daniel Webster remained in the race. Ryan won the rescheduled conference vote on October 28, and was elected speaker the next day.

== Background ==
=== Process and conventions ===
The speaker of the United States House of Representatives is the presiding officer of the United States House of Representatives. The House elects its speaker at the beginning of a new Congress (i.e. biennially, after a general election) or when a speaker dies, resigns or is removed from the position intra-term. Since 1839, the House has elected speakers by roll call vote. Traditionally, each party's caucus or conference selects a candidate for the speakership from among its senior leaders prior to the roll call. Representatives are not restricted to voting for the candidate nominated by their party, but generally do, as the outcome of the election effectively determines which party has the majority and consequently will organize the House. Representatives that choose to vote for someone other than their party's nominated candidate usually vote for someone else in their party or vote "present".

Moreover, as the Constitution does not explicitly state that the speaker must be an incumbent member of the House, it is permissible for representatives to vote for someone who is not a member of the House at the time, and non-members have received a few votes in various speaker elections over the past several years. Nevertheless, every person elected speaker has been a member.

To be elected speaker a candidate must receive an absolute majority of the votes cast, as opposed to an absolute majority of the full membership of the House – presently 218 votes, in a House of 435. There have only been a few instances during the past century where a person received a majority of the votes cast, and thus won the election, while failing to obtain a majority of the full membership. It happened in the previous election, in January 2015 (114th Congress), when John Boehner was elected with 216 votes (as opposed to 218). Such a variation in the number of votes necessary to win a given election might arise due to vacancies, absentees, or members being present but not voting. If no candidate wins a majority of the "votes cast for a person by name," then the roll call is repeated until a speaker is elected. Multiple roll calls have previously been needed only once since the American Civil War; they last occurred in 1923 and would not occur again until 2023. Upon winning election, the new speaker is immediately sworn in by the Dean of the United States House of Representatives, the chamber's longest-serving member.

=== Speakership and resignation of John Boehner ===
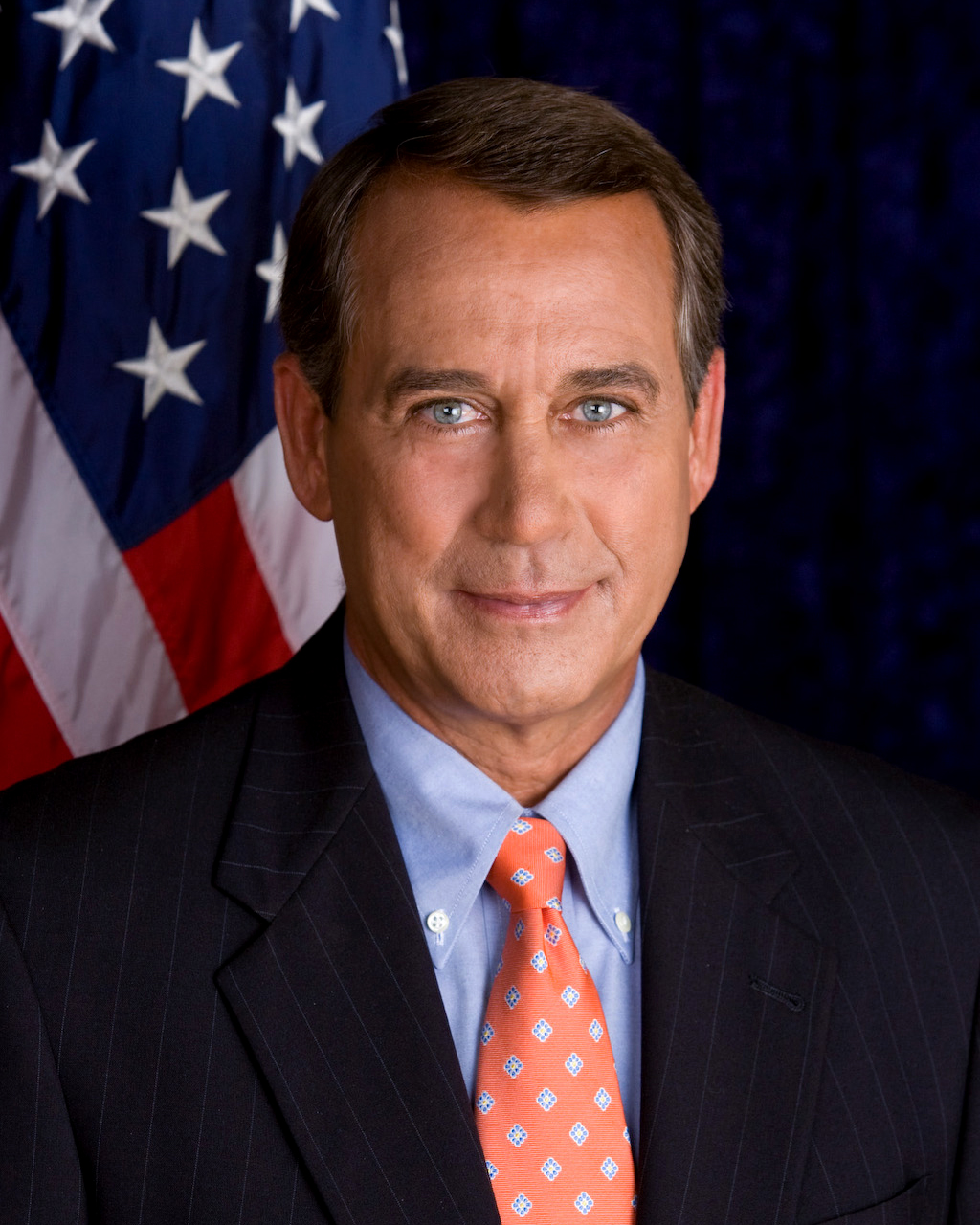
John Boehner

John Boehner, a member of the Republican Party from Ohio, served as the Majority Leader of the United States House of Representatives from February 2006 until January 2007. As the Democratic Party assumed control of the House following the 2006 elections, Boehner served as Minority Leader from January 2007 until January 2011. When Republicans reassumed control of the House of Representatives in January 2011, Boehner was elected as speaker, with the votes of all 241 of his fellow Republicans. In 2014, some House Republicans reached out to Ben Carson about his interest in becoming speaker should they be able to oust Boehner; Carson declined, citing his impending candidacy for president. Boehner's Republican opponents formed a congressional caucus, called the Freedom Caucus, in January 2015 to focus their opposition. Though Boehner was reelected as speaker at the beginning of the 114th United States Congress that month, 25 conservative members of the Republican caucus did not vote for him. Daniel Webster, a Republican from Florida, received 12 votes.

Throughout 2015, Boehner and the Freedom Caucus remained at odds. Boehner stripped his opponents of leadership posts and other perks, while the American Action Network, a group allied with Boehner, aired television ads against Freedom Caucus members in their home districts. Meanwhile, the Freedom Caucus opposed Boehner's plans, forcing him to rely on Democratic votes to pass bills. Needing to pass a federal budget for the 2016 fiscal year beginning October 1, the Freedom Caucus, now consisting of approximately 40 conservative Republicans affiliated with the Tea Party movement, threatened to block a resolution from passing unless it would defund Planned Parenthood and to initiate a vote to vacate the speakership if Boehner did not support their demands. The caucus sought the following promises: (1) the decentralization of the House Steering Committee, so that the Speaker and House Majority Leader are not solely in charge of committee assignments, (2) not supporting an increase in the U.S. debt ceiling without entitlement reform (Social Security reform and Medicare reform), (3) willingness to impeach John Koskinen, the Commissioner of Internal Revenue, and (4) passing spending bills approved by the caucus rather than a continuing resolution favored by Democrats in the United States Senate.

On July 28, 2015, Mark Meadows, a member of the Freedom Caucus from North Carolina, filed a motion to vacate the speakership, only the second time the motion had been filed. The next day, Boehner referred to the motion as "no big deal". However, following continued pressure from the Freedom Caucus, and to avoid the vacation of his speakership, Boehner announced on September 25 that he would resign the speakership and retire from Congress effective October 30. Sources from his office indicated he chose to resign due to the increasing discord within the Republican caucus so that he could manage passage of a continuing resolution to fund the government and avoid a government shutdown.

== Candidates ==
On September 28, Kevin McCarthy of California, the House Majority Leader, and Webster announced that they would run for speaker of the House. McCarthy was considered the presumptive favorite in the race. Jason Chaffetz, a Republican from Utah and the Chairman of the House Oversight and Government Reform Committee, announced his candidacy on October 4, claiming that McCarthy did not have the votes to win the election. Several Republicans urged Paul Ryan of Wisconsin, the running mate of Mitt Romney in the 2012 presidential election, to run for speaker, but he declined, saying he was a "policy guy" with a preference to focus on his role as Chairman of the House Ways and Means Committee.

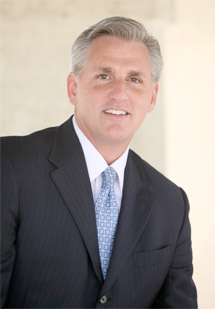
Kevin McCarthy (CA-23)

Democrat Nancy Pelosi, who served as the speaker from January 2007 through January 2011, asked her Democratic colleagues for their vote in the election. Steny Hoyer, the House Minority Whip, said that he expected the "overwhelming majority" of Democrats to vote for Pelosi. He said that if a Republican could not get the votes needed, Democrats could consider their options.

On October 7, the day before the Republican caucus scheduled a non-binding vote for speaker, Ryan and former Vice President Dick Cheney endorsed McCarthy, as did 11 of the 13 House Republicans from Pennsylvania. The Freedom Caucus decided to endorse Webster in the race. Other Republicans said they would vote against McCarthy, including Thomas Massie of Kentucky, who called McCarthy "absolutely not an option" because of his previous role as Boehner's "right-hand man". Also, Walter B. Jones, Jr. of North Carolina sent a letter to the Republican Conference Chairwoman Cathy McMorris Rodgers stating that any candidates for a leadership position with "misdeeds" should withdraw from the race. Jones has stated that his comment did not specifically refer to McCarthy, but it was widely seen as referring to rumors that McCarthy had been committing an extramarital affair with fellow Representative Renee Ellmers, a rumor that both have denied; the basis for such an allegation and interpretation is unclear.

Citing opposition from within the Republican Party, as well as fallout from controversial comments he made about the United States House Select Committee on Benghazi, McCarthy dropped out of the race on October 8. This unexpected move came without warning as House Republicans were preparing to vote on who would be their nominee for speaker, a vote which Boehner subsequently postponed. Thomas Massie and Peter T. King referred to the House as a "banana republic". Massie also criticized Boehner for postponing the election, saying they "called off the election because they didn’t like the result," which was echoed by Tom Rice, Louie Gohmert, and Justin Amash. McMorris Rodgers and Conference Vice Chairwoman Lynn Jenkins defended Boehner, saying the matter was handled properly, as conference rules give him sole discretion. Rich Lowry of National Review asked McCarthy in a phone interview if the House was governable, to which McCarthy replied "I don’t know. Sometimes you have to hit rock bottom." Charlie Dent, a Republican from Pennsylvania who had supported McCarthy, suggested that if Republicans were unable to agree on a candidate, the best option might be for a bipartisan coalition to select a speaker. Kevin McCarthy would remain as the House Majority Leader until 2019, after Republicans lost the majority in the House of Representatives. McCarthy went on to be elected House Minority Leader where he became the leader of the House Republican conference. He was unanimously re-elected Minority Leader in 2021, and led Republicans to victory winning back the House of Representatives in the November 2022 elections, albeit by a narrower margin then originally expected. McCarthy would launch his second bid for House Speaker, which he ultimately won after 15 ballots of voting. He served in the position from January 7, 2023 until October 3, 2023, where he was removed via a Motion to Vacate.

The announcement immediately set off a renewed effort to recruit Ryan as a candidate. Boehner personally called Ryan twice to ask him to run, and Chaffetz said that he would not run against Ryan if he chose to enter the race. Ryan also received calls from Mitt Romney and Trey Gowdy, among others, encouraging him to run for speaker. Additional Ryan endorsements came from Wisconsin Senator Ron Johnson, 2016 Republican presidential frontrunner Donald Trump, and House Majority Whip Steve Scalise from Louisiana. On October 9, close aides of Ryan confirmed that Ryan was reconsidering the possibility of a run.

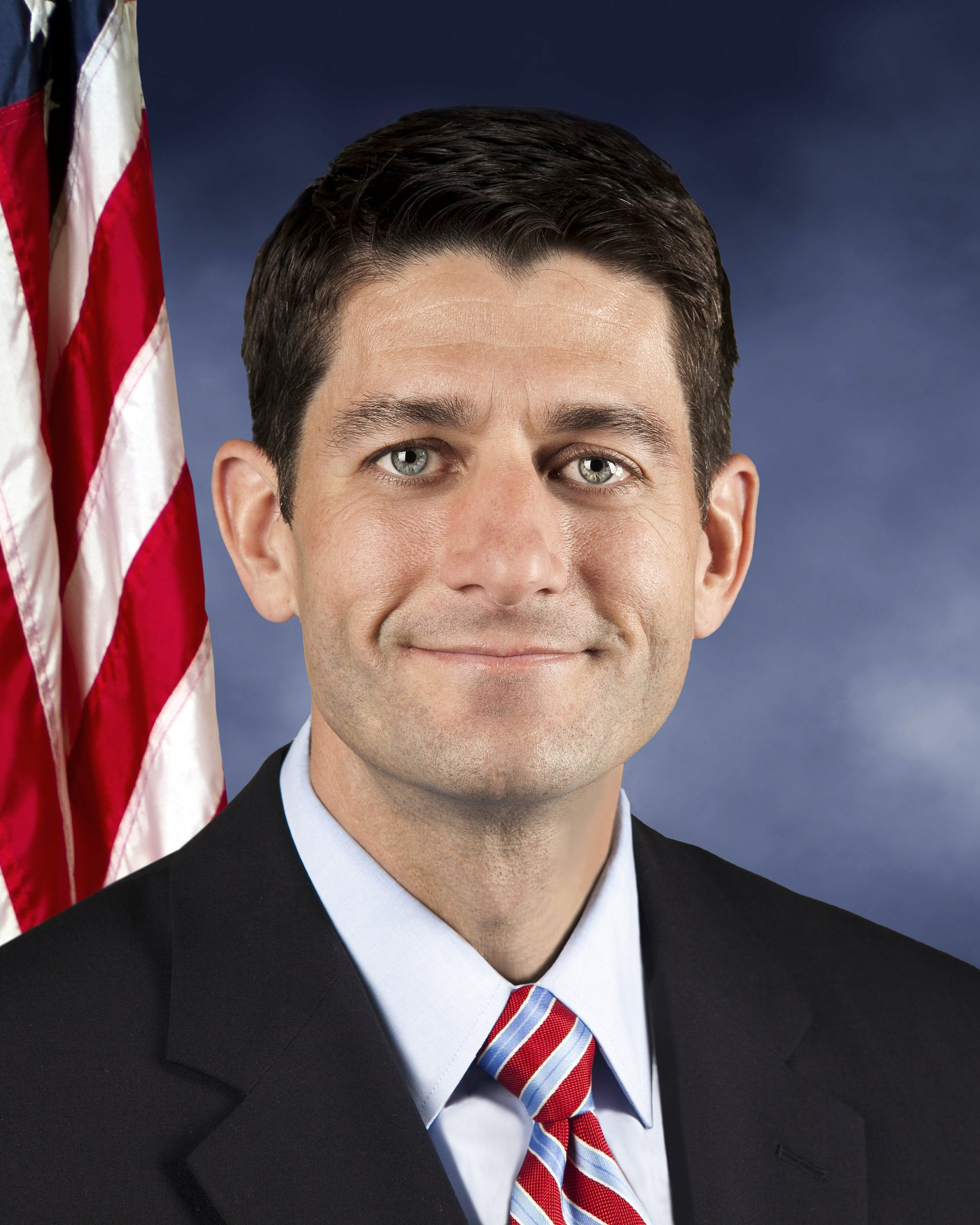
Paul Ryan (WI-01)

A possible Ryan candidacy received support from the same Freedom Caucus that opposed Boehner and McCarthy. Meadows said on October 11 that Ryan running would "definitely change the equation," and Chairman Jim Jordan described Ryan as "a good man," and stated that the Freedom Caucus would view a Ryan run "favorably".

Others who expressed their interest in running included Texas Representatives Bill Flores and Michael McCaul, Georgia Representative Lynn Westmoreland, Montana Representative Ryan Zinke, and California Representative and former Oversight Committee Chairman Darrell Issa. However, several candidates made clear that they would only run if Ryan chose not to, including Issa, McCaul, and Minnesota Representative John Kline. On October 12, Flores confirmed that he would run for speaker, but stated that he would run only if Ryan stayed out of the contest.

Ryan held a closed-door meeting with the Republican Caucus on October 20, where he explained that he would run for speaker if he could be guaranteed an overwhelming majority of the Republican caucus would support him. Specifically, Ryan requested an increased threshold for the political maneuver of vacating the speakership, stated that he would not lessen the amount of time he spends with his family, and requested an official endorsement from the Freedom Caucus, Republican Study Committee, and The Tuesday Group by October 23, before he could make his decision. Immediately after Ryan's announcement, Chaffetz announced that he would be dropping out of the race to support Ryan. The next day, the Freedom Caucus held a vote to determine which of its members would support Ryan; although the exact tally was not revealed, roughly two-thirds of the caucus voted to endorse Ryan. Although this was shy of the 80% vote needed for an official endorsement over Webster, both the caucus leaders and Ryan were satisfied with the result, and Ryan made efforts to move forward with a potential speaker bid.

On October 22, Ryan announced his bid for speaker. Flores, who chairs the Republican Study Committee, dropped out of the race and endorsed Ryan. Mo Brooks of Alabama, a member of the Freedom Caucus, announced on the floor of the House on October 27 that Ryan had agreed not to advance immigration reform legislation while Barack Obama was President of the United States, or unless it met the "Hastert Rule," as it has the support of the majority of Republicans.

Once it appeared certain that Ryan would run, and win an overwhelming majority of the caucus's votes, Boehner rescheduled the Republican caucus vote for October 28. Ryan won the nomination, defeating Webster 200 to 43 in the secret ballot voting. Blackburn and McCarthy each received one vote. The next day, Webster reportedly urged Republicans to vote for Ryan instead of him.

=== Declared ===
The following officially declared their candidacy:

- Nancy Pelosi, (Democratic Party), Minority Leader of the United States House of Representatives (since 2011; 2003–2007), United States Representative for California's 12th congressional district (since 2013), and Speaker of the United States House of Representatives (2007–2011).
- Paul Ryan, (Republican Party), United States Representative for Wisconsin's 1st congressional district (since 1999), Chairman of the Ways and Means Committee (since 2015), Republican Party nominee for Vice President of the United States in the 2012 election.
- Daniel Webster, (Republican Party), United States Representative for Florida's 10th congressional district (since 2013).
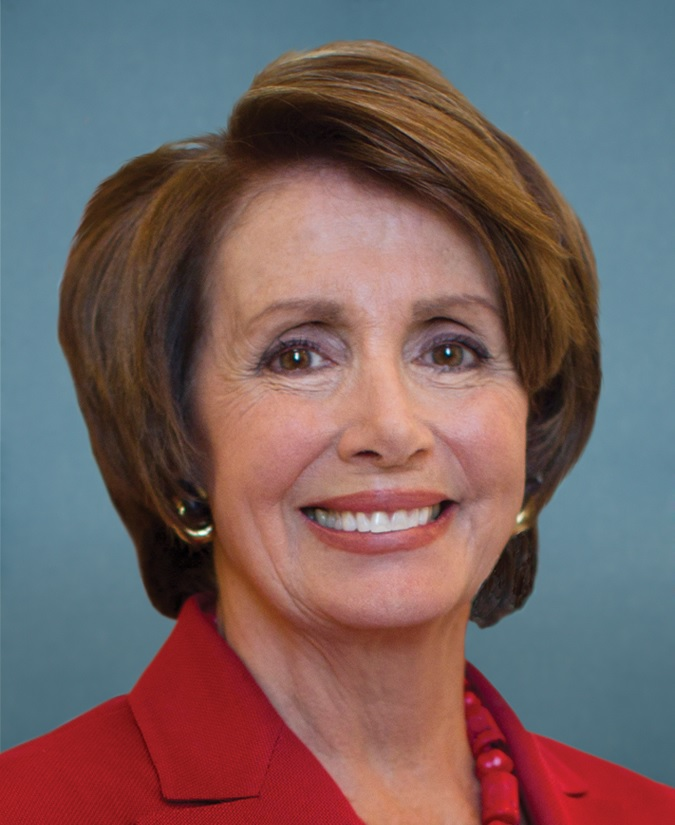
Minority Leader
Nancy Pelosi
of California

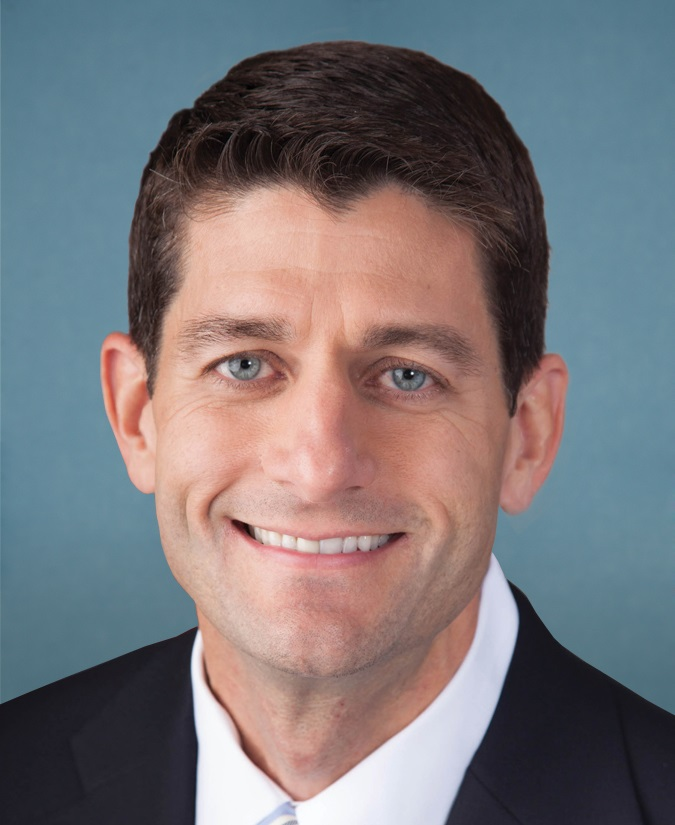
Representative
Paul Ryan
of Wisconsin

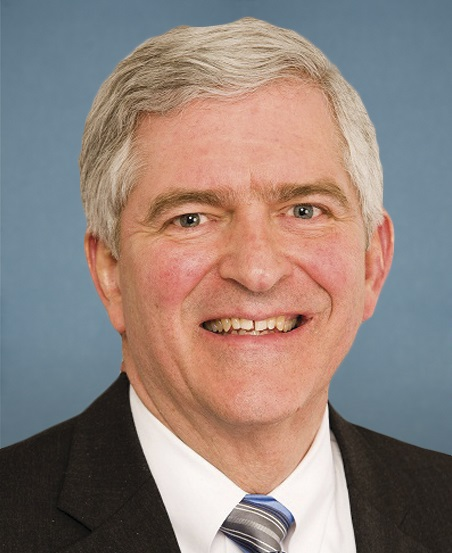
Representative
Daniel Webster
of Florida

=== Withdrawn ===
The following were candidates, but subsequently withdrew:

- Jason Chaffetz, (Republican Party), United States representative for Utah's 3rd congressional district (2008-2017), Chairman of the United States House Committee on Oversight and Government Reform (2015-2017) (Withdrew on October 20, 2015; endorsed Paul Ryan).
- Bill Flores, (Republican Party), United States representative for Texas's 17th congressional district (2011-2021). (Withdrew on October 22, 2015; endorsed Paul Ryan).
- Kevin McCarthy (Republican Party), United States representative for California's 23rd congressional district (2013-2023), Majority Leader of the United States House of Representatives (2014-2019). (Withdrew on October 8, 2015).
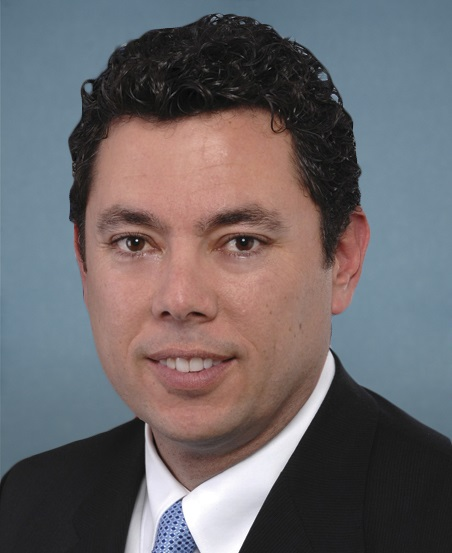
Representative
Jason Chaffetz
of Utah

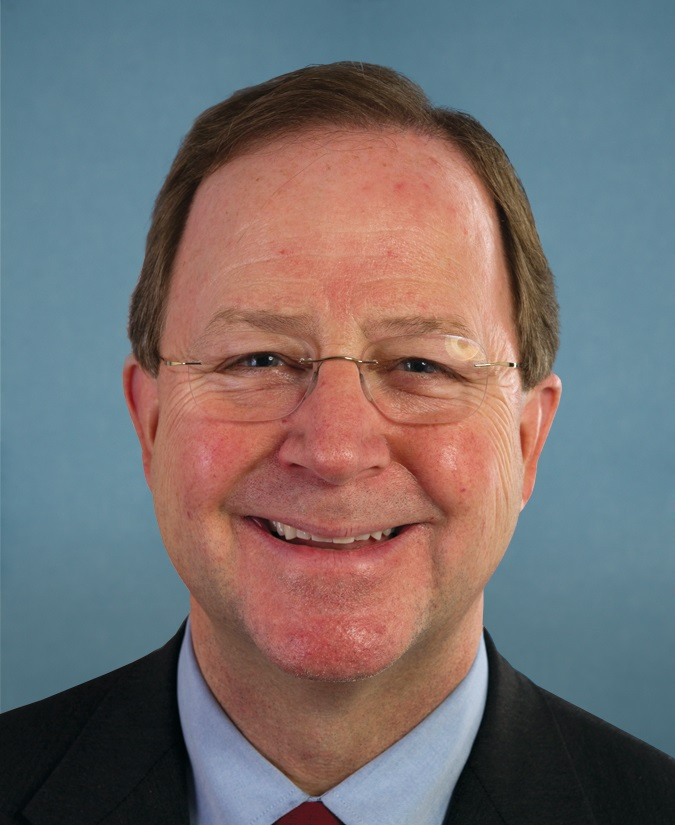
Representative
Bill Flores
of Texas

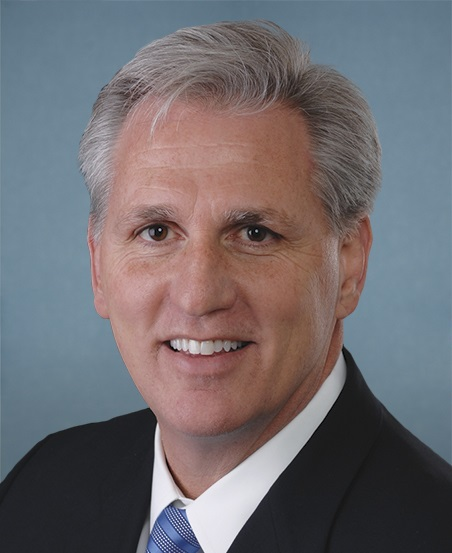
Majority Leader
Kevin McCarthy
of California

=== Publicly expressed interest ===
The following publicly expressed interest in becoming candidates:

- Darrell Issa, (Republican Party), United States representative for California's 49th congressional district (since 2003), Chairman of the House Oversight Committee (2011–2015).
- Newt Gingrich, (Republican Party), Speaker of the United States House of Representatives (1995–1999), House Minority Whip (1989–1995), United States representative for Georgia's 6th congressional district (1979–1999).
- Michael McCaul, (Republican Party), United States representative for Texas's 10th congressional district (since 2005), Chairman of the House Homeland Security Committee (since 2013).
- Mike Pompeo, (Republican Party), United States representative for Kansas's 4th congressional district (since 2011).
- Lynn Westmoreland, (Republican Party), United States representative for Georgia's 3rd congressional district (since 2007).
- Ryan Zinke, (Republican Party), United States representative for Montana's at-large congressional district (since 2015).
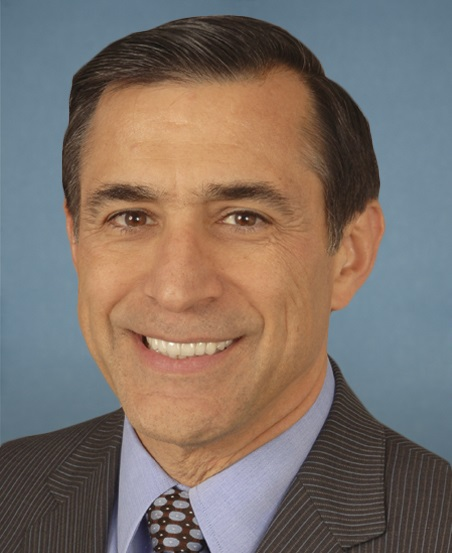
Representative
Darrell Issa
of California

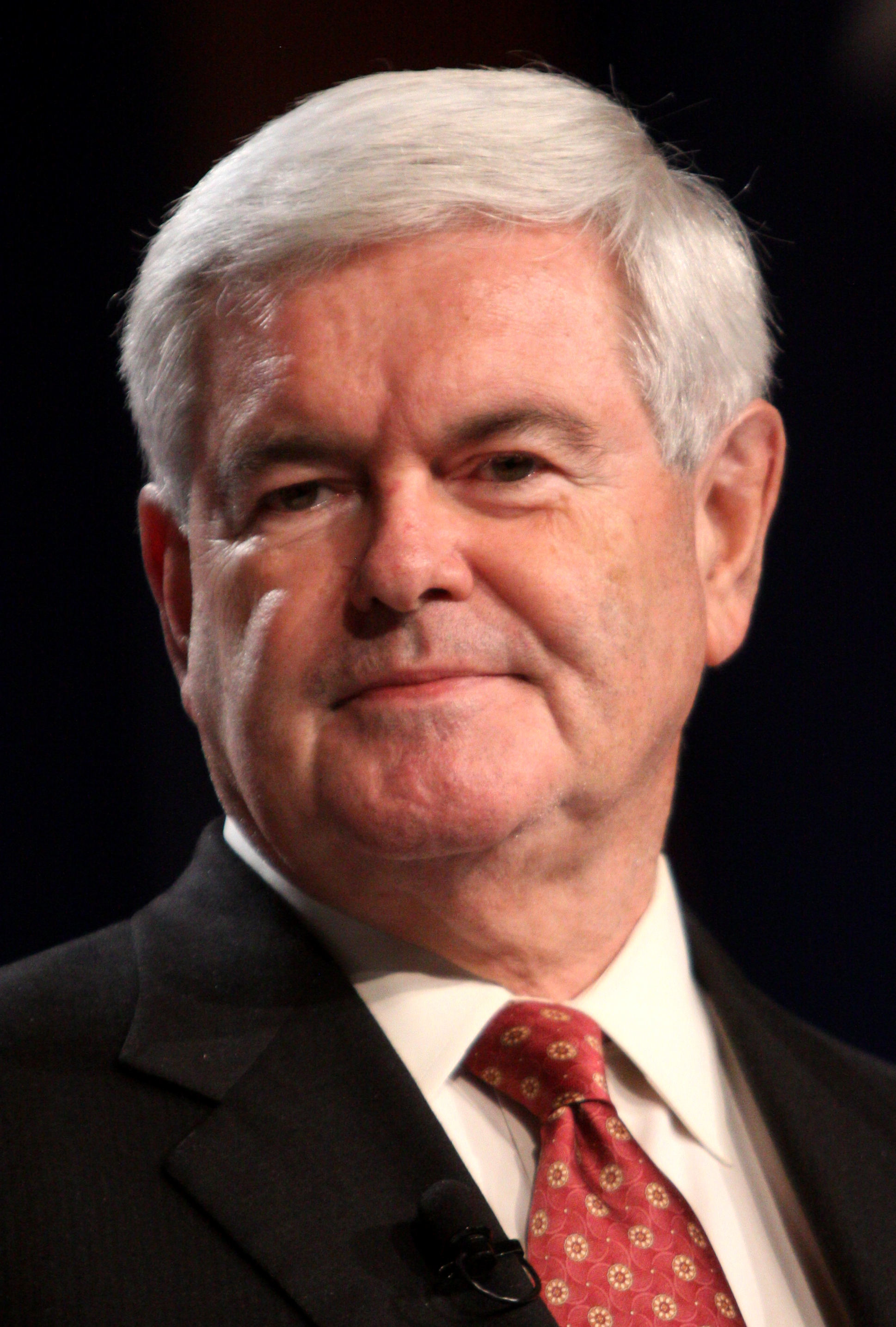
Fmr. Speaker
Newt Gingrich
of Georgia

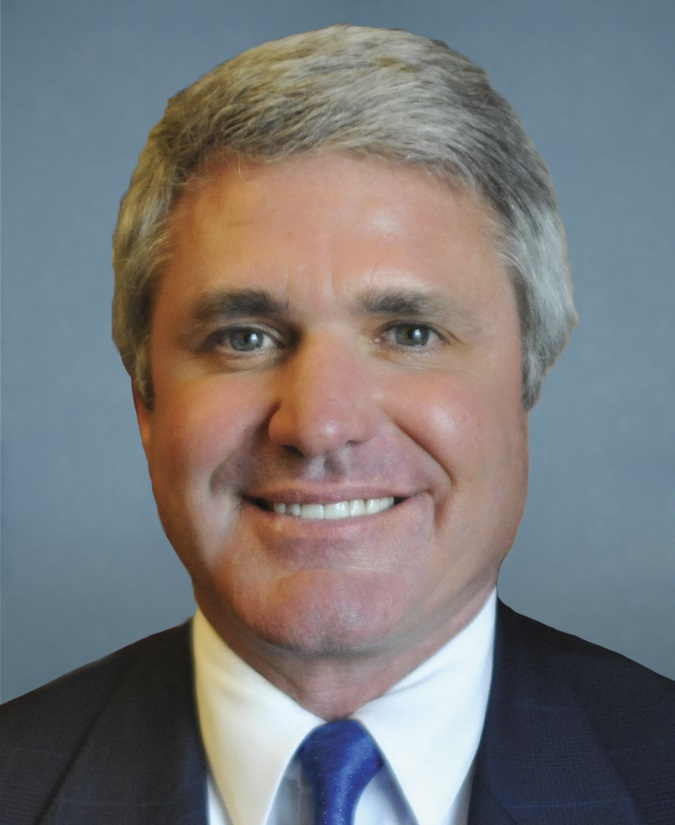
Representative
Michael McCaul
of Texas

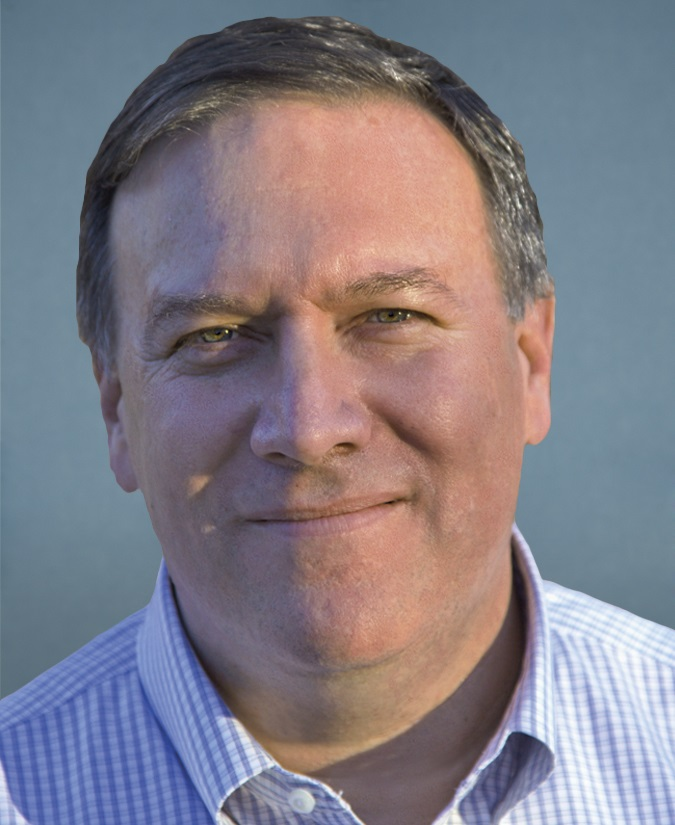
Representative
Mike Pompeo
of Kansas

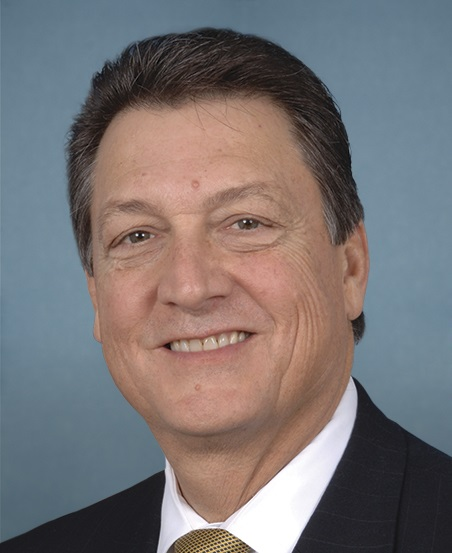
Representative
Lynn Westmoreland
of Georgia

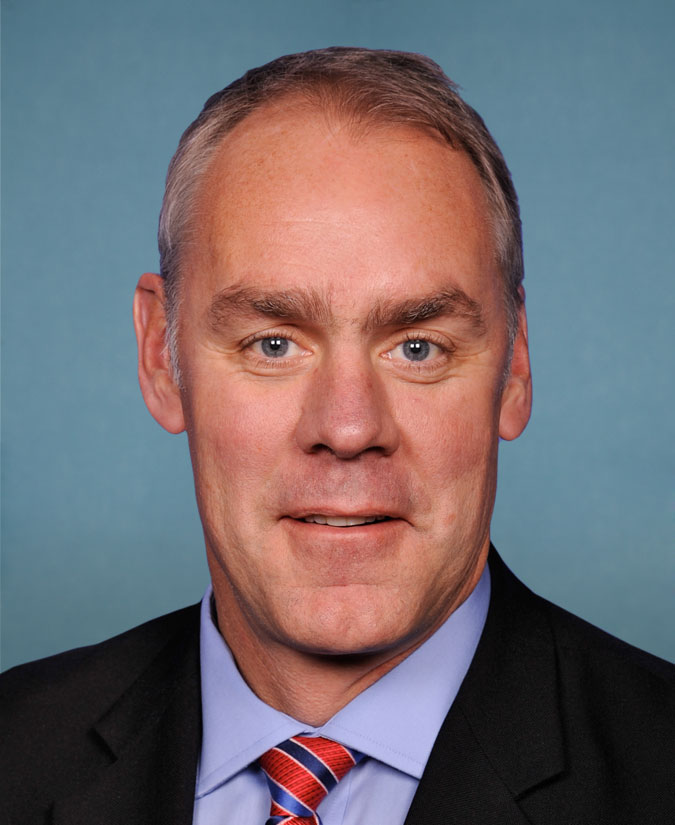
Representative
Ryan Zinke
of Montana

=== Declined to run ===
The following received some speculation about a possible candidacy, but subsequently ruled themselves out:

- Marsha Blackburn, (Republican Party), United States representative for Tennessee's 7th congressional district (since 2003).
- Trey Gowdy (Republican Party), United States representative for South Carolina's 4th congressional district (since 2011), Chairman of the House Benghazi Committee (since 2014).
- Jeb Hensarling (Republican Party), United States representative for Texas's 5th congressional district (since 2003), Chairman of the House Committee on Financial Services (since 2013).
- Cathy McMorris Rodgers (Republican Party), United States representative for Washington's 5th congressional district (since 2005), Chairman of the House Republican Conference (since 2013).
- Peter Roskam, (Republican Party), United States representative for Illinois's 6th congressional district (since 2007).
- Steve Scalise (Republican Party), United States representative for Louisiana's 1st congressional district (since 2008), Majority Whip of the United States House of Representatives (since 2014).

=== Received speculation ===
The following received speculation about a possible candidacy in at least two reliable sources:

- Diane Black, (Republican Party), United States representative for Tennessee's 6th congressional district (since 2011).
- Mike Conaway, (Republican Party), United States representative for Texas's 11th congressional district (since 2005).
- Mike Kelly, (Republican Party), United States representative for Pennsylvania's 3rd congressional district (since 2011).
- John Kline, (Republican Party), United States representative for Minnesota's 2nd congressional district (since 2003), Chairman of the House Education Committee (since 2011).
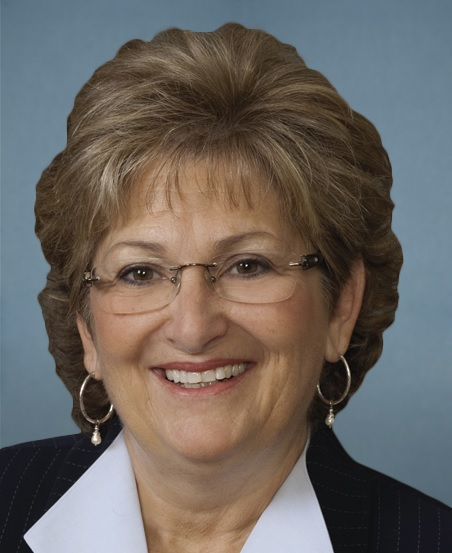
Representative
Diane Black
of Tennessee

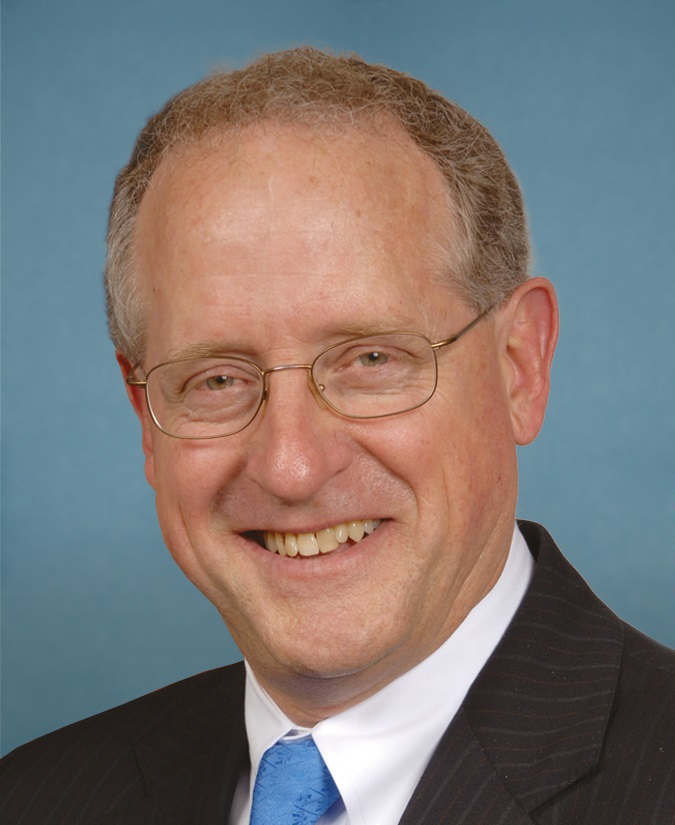
Representative
Mike Conaway
of Texas

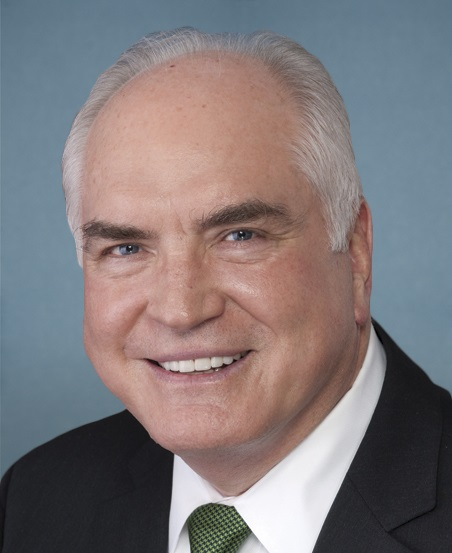
Representative
Mike Kelly
of Pennsylvania

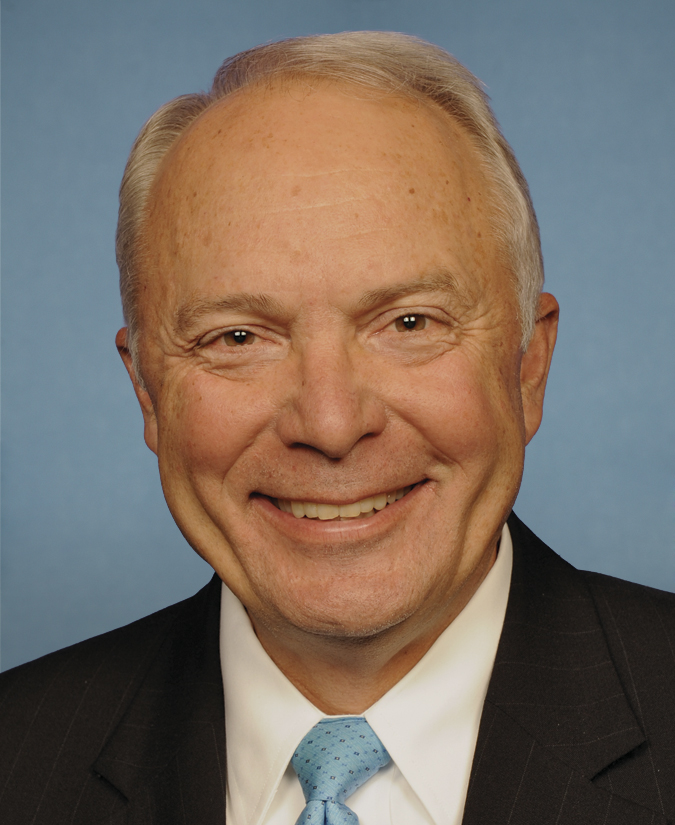
Representative
John Kline
of Minnesota

== Election of the speaker ==
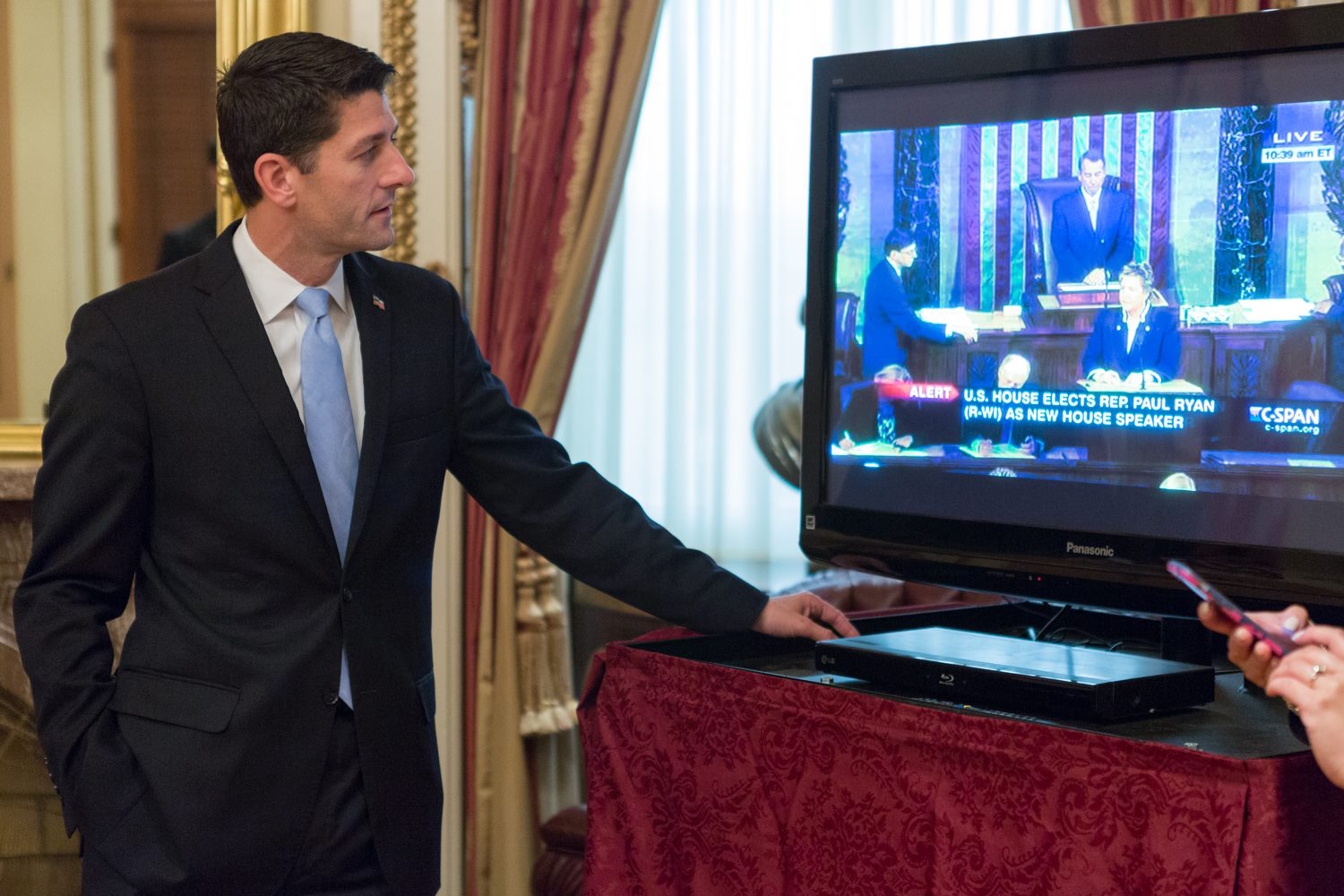
Ryan watching the floor vote electing him as speaker of the House

On October 29, 2015, Ryan was elected speaker, receiving 236 votes. Following the election, Raúl Labrador, a Freedom Caucus member from Idaho, said that Ryan will need to "realize the honeymoon is over and start bringing us some conservative policy," and that "the final exam for Paul Ryan will be in January 2017, when there is a speaker election, and we will look at his body of work and determine whether he gets a passing grade or not."

The vote count in the October 2015 speaker of the House election was:

2015 election for speaker (special) – 114th Congress
Party	Candidate	Votes	%
Republican	Paul Ryan (WI 1)	236	54.63
Democratic	Nancy Pelosi (CA 12)	184	42.60
Republican	Dan Webster (FL 10)	9	2.08
Democratic	Jim Cooper (TN 5)	1	0.23
Democratic	John Lewis (GA 5)	1	0.23
Republican	Colin Powell	1	0.23
Total votes		432	100
Votes necessary		217	>50

Ryan did not cast a vote in the election, while Pelosi did.

Representatives voting for someone other than their party's speaker nominee were:
■ Dave Brat of Virginia; Curt Clawson of Florida; Louie Gohmert of Texas; Paul Gosar of Arizona; Walter Jones of North Carolina; Thomas Massie of Kentucky; Bill Posey of Florida; Randy Weber of Texas; and Ted Yoho of Florida voted for Dan Webster;
■ Jim Cooper of Tennessee voted for Colin Powell, who was not a member of the House at the time;
■ Gwen Graham of Florida voted for Jim Cooper;
■ Kyrsten Sinema of Arizona voted for John Lewis.

== See also ==
- October 2023 Speaker of the United States House of Representatives election
