= 1923 Speaker of the United States House of Representatives election =

- December 3–5, 1923

Needed to win: Majority of votes cast First ballot: 420 votes cast, 211 needed for a majority Ninth ballot: 414 votes cast, 208 needed for a majority
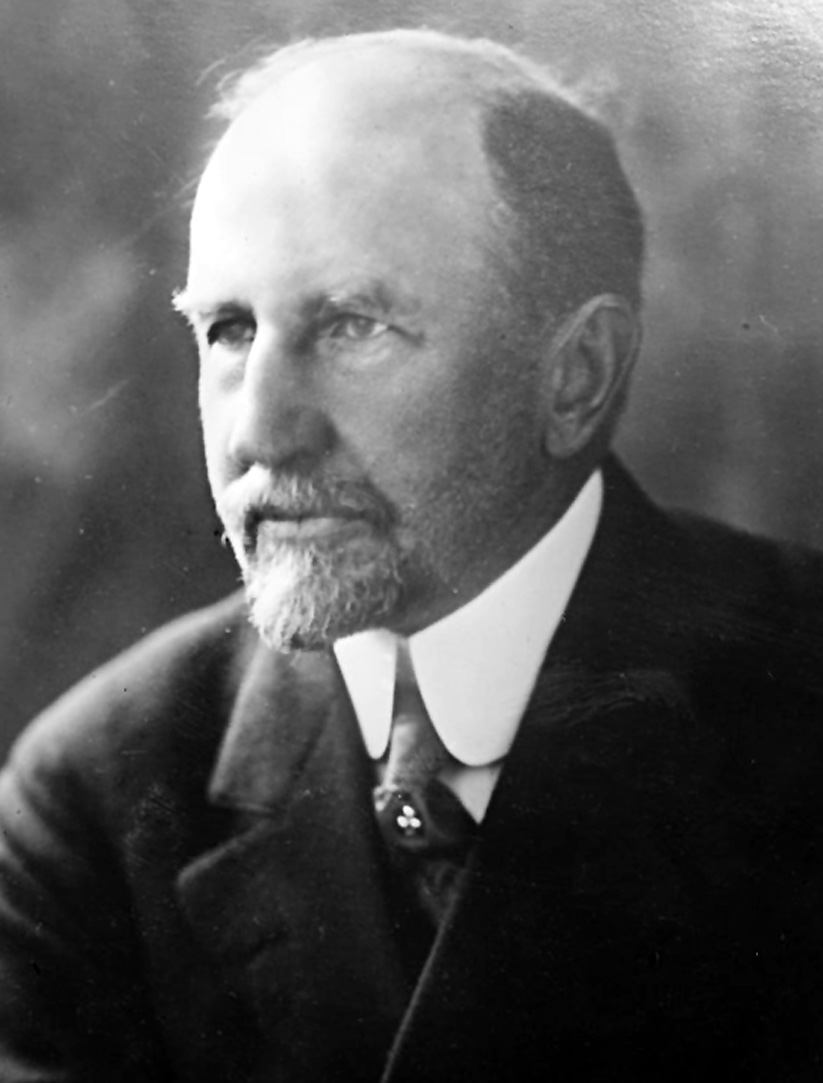

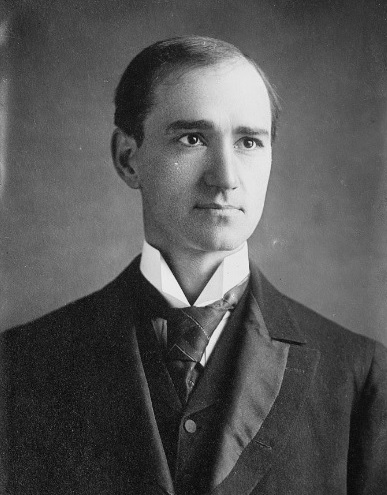

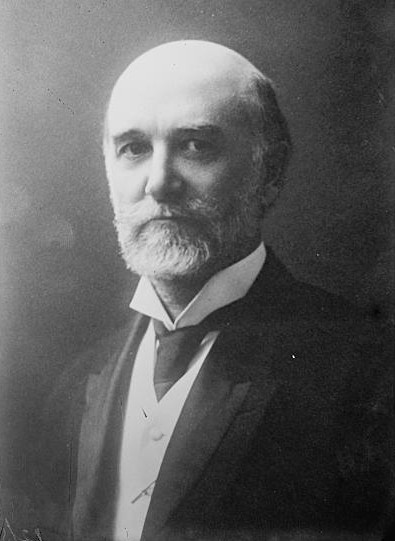

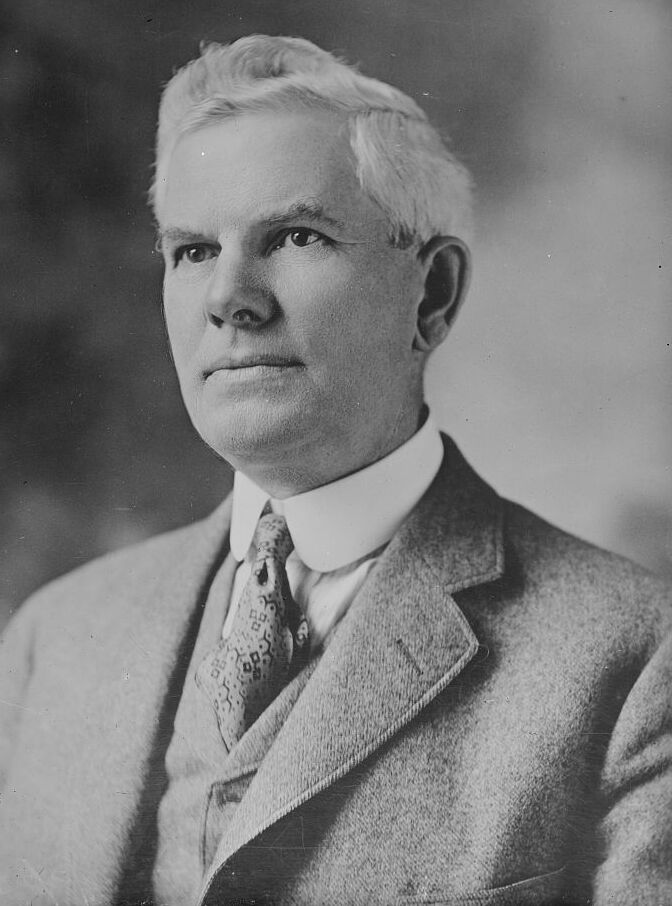
| | Majority party | Minority party |
|---|---|---|
| Candidate | Frederick H. Gillett | Finis J. Garrett |
| Party | Republican | Democratic |
| Seat | Massachusetts 2nd | Tennessee 9th |
| First ballot | 197 (47.6%) | 195 (46.8%) |
| Final ballot | 212 (51.9%) | 200 (46.3%) |
| | Third party | Fourth party |
| Candidate | Henry A. Cooper | Martin B. Madden |
| Party | Republican | Republican |
| Seat | Wisconsin 1st | Illinois 1st |
| First ballot | 17 (4.1%) | 5 (1.2%) |
| Final ballot | — | 2 (0.5%) |
Speaker before election
Frederick H. Gillett
Republican
Elected Speaker
Frederick H. Gillett
Republican

At the opening of the 68th United States Congress, the members-elect of the House of Representatives held an election for Speaker of the House on December 3–5, 1923. Republican Frederick H. Gillett received a majority of the votes cast in the 9th ballot and was re-elected speaker. This was the first multiple ballot speaker election since 1859–60, and the last until January 2023.

Progressive Republicans, primarily those from the states of Minnesota and Wisconsin, refused to support Speaker Gillett for the first eight ballots. After winning concessions from Republican conference leaders (a seat on the House Rules Committee and a pledge that requested House rules changes would be considered), progressives agreed to support Gillett.

== Process and conventions ==
The speaker is the presiding officer of the U.S. House of Representatives. The House elects its speaker at the beginning of a new Congress (i.e. biennially) or when a speaker dies, resigns, or is removed from the position intra-term. Since 1839, the House has elected speakers by roll call vote. Following an election, there being no speaker, the outgoing clerk summons, convenes, and calls the House to order. They then order and oversee the election of a speaker of the House.

As the outgoing clerk of the U.S. House of Representatives, William Tyler Page oversaw the 1923 election of a speaker as the acting presiding officer.

Traditionally since the American Civil War, each of the party caucuses and conferences in the U.S. Congress selects a candidate for the speakership from among its senior leaders prior to the roll call. Representatives generally vote for the candidate nominated by their party, as the outcome of the election effectively determines which one is the majority party and consequently will organize the House. They are not however, restricted from voting for someone else.

Upon winning election, the new speaker is immediately sworn in by the dean of the U.S. House of Representatives, the chamber's longest-serving member. The new speaker then administers the oath en masse to the rest of the members of the House.

To be elected speaker, a candidate must receive an absolute majority of the votes cast, as opposed to an absolute majority of the full membership of the House. A variation in the number of votes necessary to win a given election might arise due to vacancies, absentees, or members being present but not voting. Multiple roll calls had been necessary only 12 times since 1789.

== Election of the speaker ==
The election for speaker was held December 3–5, 1923, at the start of the 68th Congress. At the time of the proceedings, there were three vacant seats.

=== First through fourth ballot (December 3) ===
On the first ballot, 22 Republicans voted for Henry A. Cooper and Martin B. Madden. Sydney Anderson of Minnesota gave a nominating speech for Gillett and John W. Rainey of Illinois nominated Garrett. Edward E. Browne of Wisconsin nominated Henry A. Cooper to "stand for a reformation of the rules that govern this body." Frank R. Reid of Illinois nominated Martin B. Madden, after which Madden rose to announce that he was not a candidate.

After the fourth ballot, Nicholas Longworth of Ohio motioned to adjourn until noon the next day, and the motion was agreed to at 3:46 p.m.

1923 election for speaker (1st through 4th ballots)
| Party | Candidate | 1st ballot | | 2nd ballot | | 3rd ballot | | 4th ballot | |
| Party | Candidate | Votes | % | Votes | % | Votes | % | Votes | % |
|---|---|---|---|---|---|---|---|---|---|
| Republican | Frederick H. Gillett (OH 4) | 197 | 47.58% | 194 | 47.20% | 195 | 47.22% | 197 | 47.47% |
| Democratic | Finis J. Garrett (TN 9) | 195 | 47.10% | 194 | 47.20% | 196 | 47.46% | 196 | 47.23% |
| Republican | Henry A. Cooper (WI 1) | 17 | 4.11% | 17 | 4.14% | 17 | 4.12% | 17 | 4.10% |
| Republican | Martin B. Madden (IL 1) | 5 | 1.21% | 6 | 1.46% | 5 | 1.21% | 5 | 1.20% |
| Total votes | | 420 | 100% | 411 | 100% | 413 | 100% | 415 | 100% |
| Votes needed to win | | 211 | >50% | 206 | >50% | 207 | >50% | 208 | >50% |

=== Fifth through eighth ballot (December 4) ===
Balloting began on December 4 without new nominating speeches.

After the eighth ballot, Longworth motioned to adjourn until noon the next day, and the motion was agreed to at 2:30 p.m.

1923 election for speaker (5th through 8th ballots)
| Party | Candidate | 5th ballot | | 6th ballot | | 7th ballot | | 8th ballot | |
| Party | Candidate | Votes | % | Votes | % | Votes | % | Votes | % |
|---|---|---|---|---|---|---|---|---|---|
| Republican | Frederick H. Gillett (OH 4) | 197 | 47.36% | 195 | 47.10% | 196 | 47.12% | 196 | 47.12% |
| Democratic | Finis J. Garrett (TN 9) | 197 | 47.36% | 197 | 47.58% | 198 | 47.60% | 198 | 47.60% |
| Republican | Henry A. Cooper (WI 1) | 17 | 4.09% | 17 | 4.11% | 17 | 4.09% | 17 | 4.09% |
| Republican | Martin B. Madden (IL 1) | 5 | 1.20% | 5 | 1.21% | 5 | 1.20% | 5 | 1.20% |
| Total votes | | 416 | 100% | 414 | 100% | 416 | 100% | 416 | 100% |
| Votes needed to win | | 209 | >50% | 208 | >50% | 209 | >50% | 209 | >50% |

=== Ninth and final ballot (December 5) ===
Before the ninth ballot, Representative-elect Joseph W. Morris of Kentucky presented his credentials and was added to the roll.

Before voting began, John M. Nelson of Wisconsin announced that he and Fiorello La Guardia of New York had conferred with Longworth the previous night and discussed revision of the House rules. Longworth, negotiating on behalf of House leadership, had agreed to leave the rules of the 67th Congress in place for thirty days, during which members could submit an amendments for consideration by the Committee on Rules, to be reported out before the period expired, after which amendments could be offered and a vote taken at the request of any member. Longworth affirmed the agreement.

After some questioning, John Nance Garner of Texas asked whether Nelson had "submitted willingly to this outrage," upon which the House devolved into laughter and the Clerk called for order.

After order had been restored, Henry Allen Cooper himself rose to speak in support of the agreement. He declared that the "so-called Progressives" had "succeeded to deprive the Speaker of [his] power, not because any of us had ceased to be Republicans, not because any of us were anarchists... but simply because we wished to give the Representatives of the American people on this floor an opportunity to represent the constituents who honored them by sending them here. ... That is representative government, and anything else is tyranny." His speech was interrupted by James T. Begg of Ohio, who objected and called for a vote. He was joined by William R. Wood of Indiana and Garrett, and the roll call proceeded.

1923 election for speaker (ninth ballot)
| Party | Candidate | Votes | % |
|---|---|---|---|
| Republican | Frederick H. Gillett (MA 2) | 215 | 51.94% |
| Democratic | Finis J. Garrett (TN 9) | 197 | 47.58% |
| Republican | Martin B. Madden (IL 1) | 2 | 0.48% |
| Total votes | | 414 | 100% |
| Votes necessary | | 208 | >50% |

=== Votes cast by members ===
All House members of the 68th United States Congress voted for their party's nominee in every ballot except those noted here.

| Member | Party | District | Ballot vote cast | | | | | | | | |
| Member | Party | District | December 3 | | | | December 4 | | | | December 5 |
| Member | Party | District | 1st | 2nd | 3rd | 4th | 5th | 6th | 7th | 8th | 9th |
|---|---|---|---|---|---|---|---|---|---|---|---|
| Joseph D. Beck | Republican | WI 7 | Cooper | | | | | | | | Gillett |
| Edward E. Browne | Republican | WI 8 | Cooper | | | | | | | | Gillett |
| Frank Clague | Republican | MN 2 | Cooper | | | | | | | | Gillett |
| Charles Russell Davis | Republican | MN 3 | Cooper | | | | | | | | Gillett |
| James A. Frear | Republican | WI 10 | Cooper | | | | | | | | Gillett |
| Oscar Keller | Republican | MN 4 | Cooper | | | | | | | | Gillett |
| Harold Knutson | Republican | MN 6 | Cooper | | | | | | | | Gillett |
| Ole J. Kvale | Farmer-Labor | MN 7 | Cooper | | | | | | | | present |
| Fiorello La Guardia | Republican | NY 20 | Cooper | | | | | | | | Gillett |
| Florian Lampert | Republican | WI 6 | Cooper | | | | | | | | Gillett |
| John M. Nelson | Republican | WI 3 | Cooper | | | | | | | | Gillett |
| Hubert H. Peavey | Republican | WI 11 | Cooper | | | | | | | | Gillett |
| John C. Schafer | Republican | WI 4 | Cooper | | | | | | | | Gillett |
| George J. Schneider | Republican | WI 9 | Cooper | | | | | | | | Gillett |
| James H. Sinclair | Republican | ND 3 | Cooper | | | | | | | | Gillett |
| Edward Voigt | Republican | WI 2 | Cooper | | | | | | | | Gillett |
| Knud Wefald | Farmer-Labor | MN 9 | Cooper | | | | | | | | present |
| W. Frank James | Republican | MI 12 | Madden | | | | | | | | |
| Edward John King | Republican | IL 15 | Madden | | | | | | | | Gillett |
| M. Alfred Michaelson | Republican | IL 7 | Madden | | | | | | | | Gillett |
| Frank R. Reid | Republican | IL 11 | Madden | | | | | | | | |
| Roy O. Woodruff | Republican | MI 10 | Madden | | | | | | | | Gillett |
| Richard Yates Jr. | Republican | IL at-large | [data missing] | Madden | [data missing] | | Gillett | | | | |
| Victor Berger | Socialist | WI 5 | present | | | | | | | | |
| Finis Garrett | Democratic | TN 9 | present | | | | | | | | |
| Henry Allen Cooper | Republican | WI 1 | present | | | | | | | | Gillett |
| Frederick H. Gillett | Republican | MA 2 | present | [data missing] | | | | | | | |

==== Summary ====
Speaker ballot
| Date | December 3 | | | | December 4 | | | | December 5 |
| Ballot | 1st | 2nd | 3rd | 4th | 5th | 6th | 7th | 8th | 9th |
|---|---|---|---|---|---|---|---|---|---|
| Frederick H. Gillett | 197 | 194 | 195 | 197 | | 195 | 196 | | 215 |
| Finis J. Garrett | 195 | 194 | 196 | | 197 | | 198 | | 197 |
| Henry Allen Cooper | 17 | | | | | | | | |
| Martin B. Madden | 5 | 6 | 5 | | | | | | 2 |
| Total | 414 | 411 | 414 | 416 | | 414 | 416 | | 395 |
| Majority | 208 | 206 | 208 | 209 | | 208 | 209 | | 198 |
| present | | | | | | | 3 | | 4 |
| Not voting | | | | | | | | | 1 |
