= Louisiana's 8th House of Representatives district =

American legislative district

Louisiana's 8th State House of Representatives district
Representative
| Raymond J. Crews; R–Bossier City |

Louisiana's 8th House of Representatives district is one of 105 Louisiana House of Representatives districts. It is currently represented by Republican Raymond J. Crews of Bossier City. It was formerly represented by current House of Representatives Speaker, Republican Mike Johnson.

== Geography ==
HD7 includes the town of Benton, and parts of the cities of Shreveport and Bossier City.

== Election results ==
| Year | Winning candidate | Party | Percent | Opponent | Party | Percent |
|---|---|---|---|---|---|---|
| 2011 | Jeff R. Thompson | Republican | 56.8% | Duke Lowrie | Republican | 43.2% |
| 2015 (Special) | Mike Johnson | Republican | 100% | | | |
| 2015 | Mike Johnson | Republican | 100% | | | |
| 2017 (Special) | Raymond J. Crews | Republican | 64.1% | Robbie Gatti Jr. | Republican | 35.9% |
| 2019 | Raymond J. Crews | Republican | 100% | | | |
| 2023 | Raymond J. Crews | Republican | 100% | | | |
