= 2025 Speaker of the United States House of Representatives election =

- January 3, 2025

Needed to win: Majority of the votes cast 434 votes cast; 218 needed for a majority
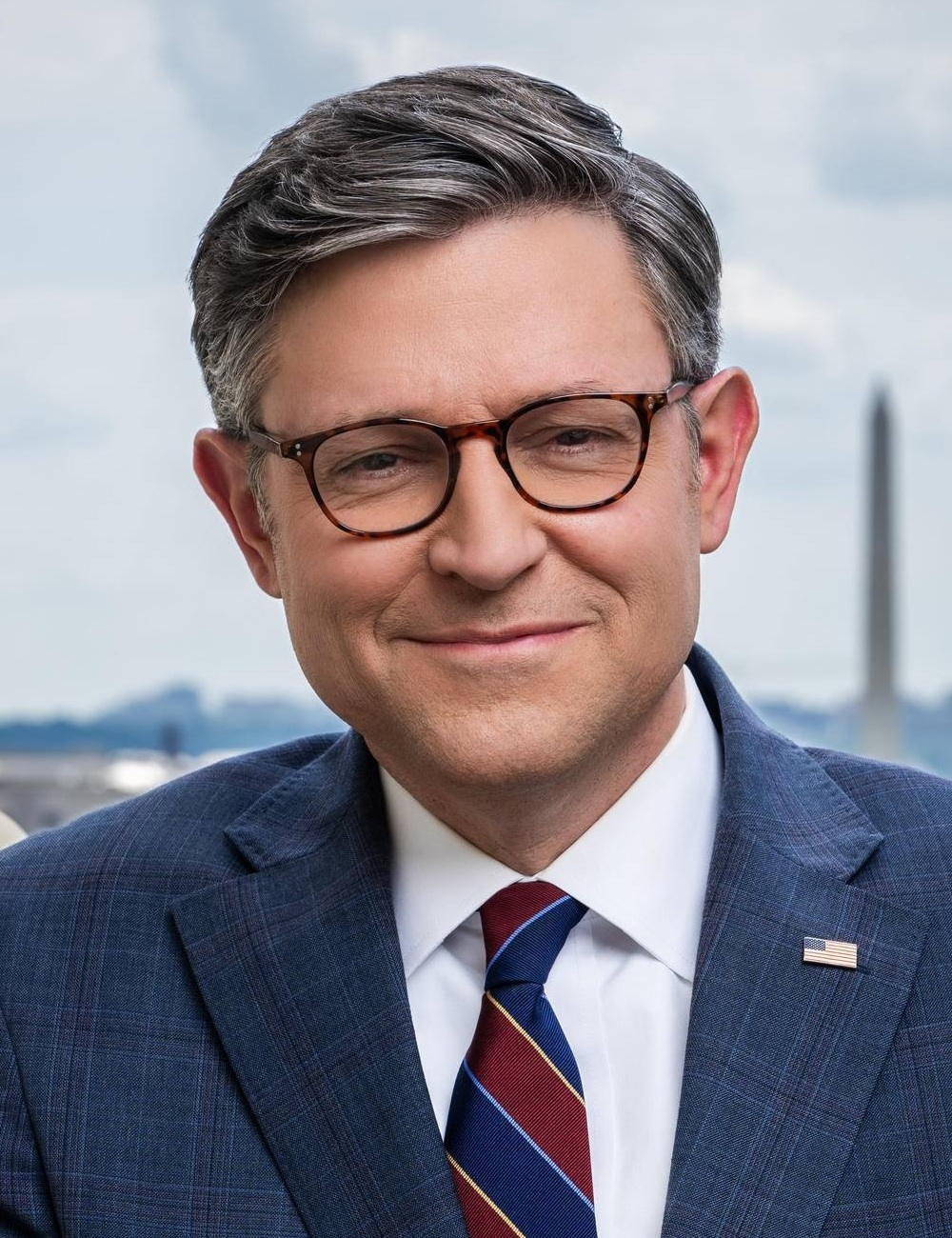

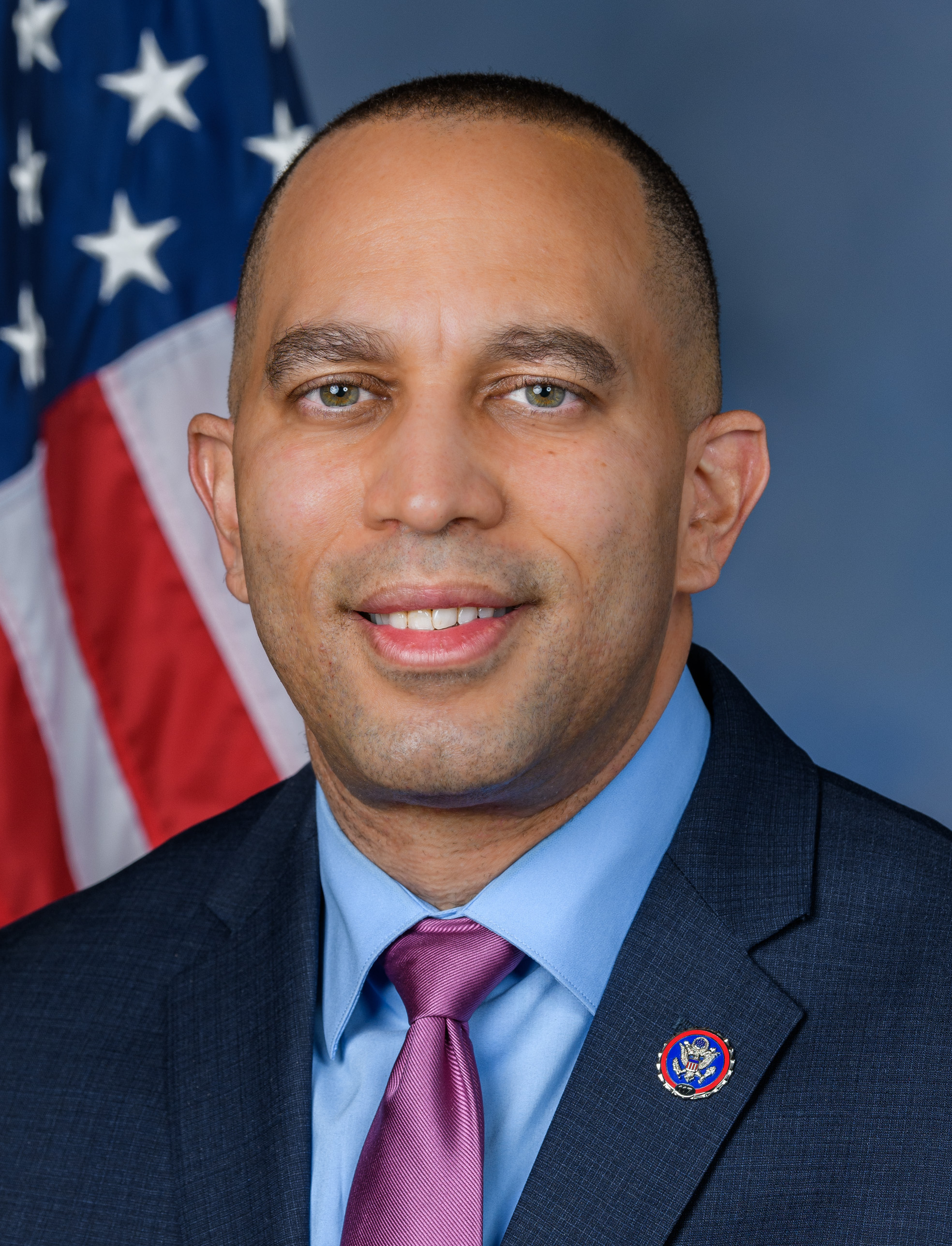

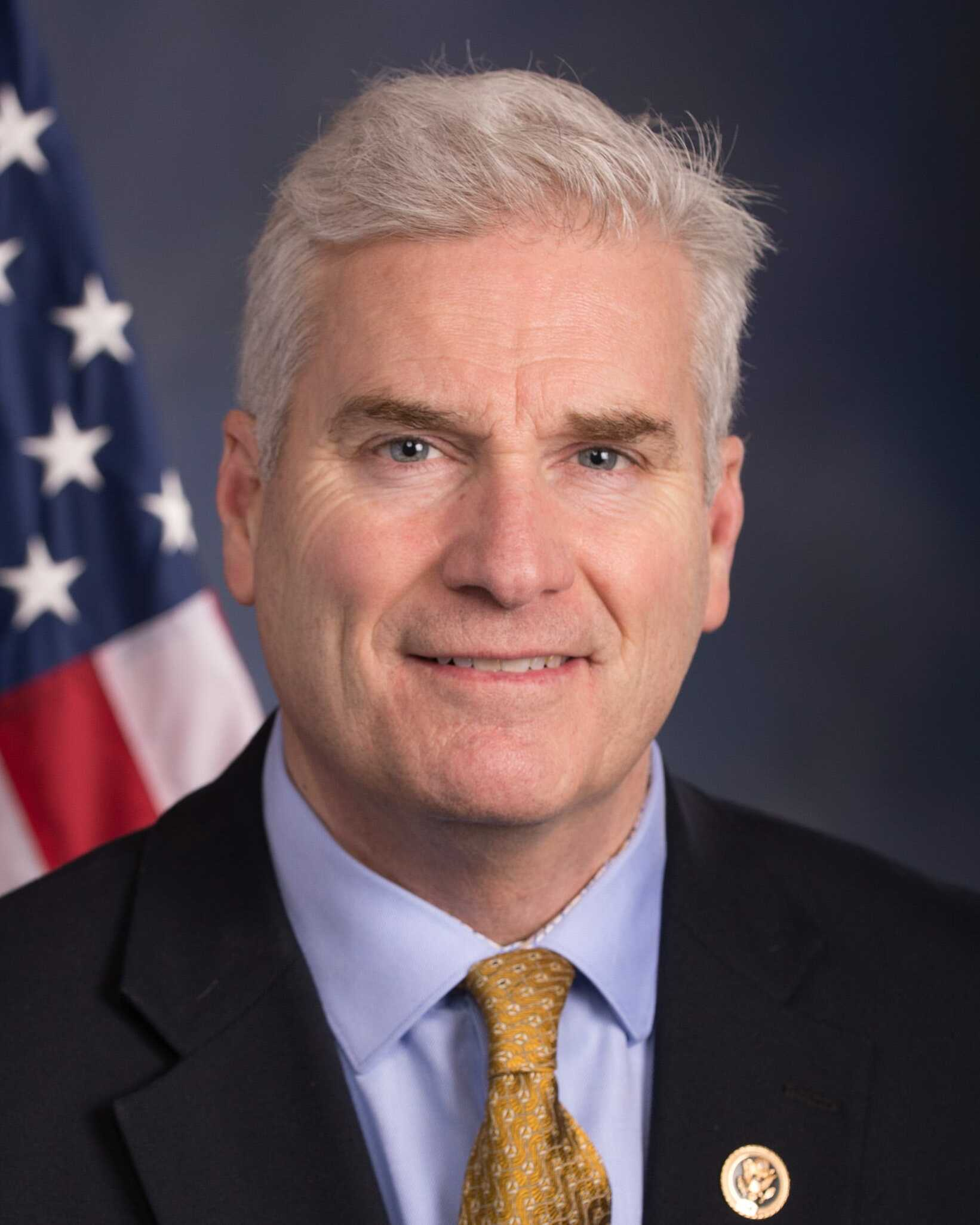
| | Majority party | Minority party |
|---|---|---|
| Candidate | Mike Johnson | Hakeem Jeffries |
| Party | Republican | Democratic |
| Leader's seat | Louisiana 4th | New York 8th |
| Members' vote | 218 (50.23%) | 215 (49.54%) |
| | Third party |
| Candidate | Tom Emmer |
| Party | Republican |
| Leader's seat | Minnesota 6th |
| Members' vote | 1 (0.23%) |
Speaker before election
Mike Johnson
Republican
Elected Speaker
Mike Johnson
Republican

An election for speaker of the United States House of Representatives took place on January 3, 2025, on the opening day of the 119th United States Congress, two months after the 2024 elections for the United States House of Representatives.

The incumbent speaker, Republican Mike Johnson of Louisiana, was re-elected on the first ballot, defeating Hakeem Jeffries with a slim 218–215 majority. Johnson, who had replaced Kevin McCarthy in October 2023 after McCarthy was removed from the position, was initially expected to lose on the first ballot, as several Republican congressmen had told major news outlets they had no intention to vote for him. On the opening day of the 119th Congress, three Republicans—Thomas Massie, Ralph Norman, and Keith Self—voted against Johnson, while all Democrats voted for Jeffries, thus, it had initially appeared that Johnson had fallen short of the 218 vote majority. However, shortly before the vote was finalized by House clerk Kevin McCumber, Norman and Self switched their votes to Johnson, which gave him the majority to secure the speakership.

== Process and conventions ==
The speaker is the presiding officer of the U.S. House of Representatives. The House elects its speaker at the beginning of a new Congress (i.e. biennially, after Election Day) or when a speaker dies, resigns, or is removed from the position intra-term. Since 1839, the House has elected speakers by roll call vote. Following a congressional election and the adjournment of the prior congress, there being no speaker, the House clerk summons, convenes, and calls the House to order. After prayer offered by the House chaplain, the clerk leads the representatives in the Pledge of Allegiance before ordering a roll call conducted by the reading clerk. The clerk and its officers then order and oversee the election of a speaker. During these processes, the clerk must "preserve order and decorum and decide all questions of order", which is subject to appeal to the body.

Traditionally, each of the party caucuses and conferences selects a candidate for the speakership from among its senior leaders prior to the roll call. Representatives are not restricted to voting for the candidate nominated by their party but generally do, as the outcome of the election effectively determines which one is the majority party and consequently will organize the House. Without a speaker, members-elect of the House cannot be sworn in. (Note: The Twentieth Amendment states that all members' terms begin at noon on January 3. Until officially sworn-in, members are referred to as members-elect.) The House is unable to conduct any business other than electing the speaker. Because the rules of the House are adopted for each new Congress, the House will not have rules until the election is complete allowing the members to be sworn in and the House to adopt rules.

Representatives that choose to vote for someone other than their party's nominated candidate usually vote for another member within the party or vote present, which entails abstention. Moreover, as the Constitution does not explicitly state that the speaker must be an incumbent member of the House, it is permissible for representatives to nominate and vote for someone who is not a member of the House at the time, and non-members have been nominated and received a few votes in various speaker elections over the past several years. Nevertheless, every person elected speaker has been a member. Upon winning election, the new speaker is immediately sworn in by the House dean, the chamber's longest-serving member. The new speaker then administers the oath en masse to the rest of the members of the House.

To be elected speaker, a candidate must receive a majority of votes cast, as opposed to a majority of the entire membership of the House. There have only been a few instances during the past century where a person received a majority of the votes cast and thus won the election while failing to obtain a majority of the full membership. This occurred most recently in 2023 when Kevin McCarthy was elected with 216 votes (as opposed to 218). Such a variation in the number of votes necessary to win a given election might arise due to vacancies, absentees, or members being present but not voting. If no candidate wins a majority of the votes cast for a person by name, then the roll call is repeated until a speaker is elected.

== Republican nomination ==
Republicans retained their slim majority in the House of Representatives, despite losing a seat, during the 2024 United States House of Representatives elections. With a two seat larger majority, in the January 2023 Speaker of the United States House of Representatives election, a faction of the Republican majority, mostly represented by the Freedom Caucus, refused to support Republican speaker nominee Kevin McCarthy without concessions. McCarthy eventually was elected speaker, following four days of voting and 15 ballots, after agreeing to name hardline Republicans to the powerful United States House Committee on Rules and allow any member to force a vote to remove the Speaker through a motion to vacate the chair. Despite these concessions, McCarthy was removed as Speaker by dissident Republicans and all Democrats on October 3, 2023, after he worked to pass a clean continuing resolution to avert a government shutdown. Mike Johnson was elected speaker, after four ballots, on October 25, 2023. Some Republicans blocked the nominations of Steve Scalise and Tom Emmer as speaker, while more moderate Republicans blocked the nomination of Jim Jordan. In May 2024, after Johnson passed military aid for Ukraine, some Republicans attempted to remove Johnson from the speakership. However, this attempt was blocked by a majority of both Democrats and Republicans.

Republicans voted to nominate their speaker of the House candidate on Wednesday, November 13. On November 12, Politico reported that members of the House Freedom Caucus planned to force an internal secret ballot vote on the speakership of Mike Johnson. Their opposition to Johnson was mostly meant as a way to protest against some proposed rule changes (due to be voted on by the Conference) which would revoke Conference assignments from Republicans who break party lines on procedural votes or introduce a motion to vacate.

Before the vote, members of the Freedom Caucus and the Main Street Caucus, along with speaker Mike Johnson, reached an agreement: the proposed rule changes on Conference assignments would be withdrawn; in exchange, the holdouts pledged to support a reform of the motion to vacate, which would raise the threshold to introduce it from one member to nine members. After the deal was struck, Johnson was nominated by voice vote without opposition.

Following Speaker Johnson's December 17 announcement of a continuing resolution to avert a government shutdown, which included funding opposed by many conservative Republicans, Republican representative Thomas Massie said he would vote against Johnson in the upcoming speakership election. Politico and Punchbowl News reported that privately several other Republicans were "uncommitted" to supporting Johnson. Later, Republican senators Rand Paul and Mike Lee, as well as Republican representative Marjorie Taylor Greene, publicly announced that they are open to supporting Elon Musk to be the next Speaker of the House. On December 20, Freedom Caucus chair Andy Harris said he was "undecided." On December 30, 2024, President-elect Donald Trump endorsed Johnson through a post on Truth Social. Despite the endorsement, multiple Republican representatives have publicly said they are uncommitted to voting for Johnson; including Victoria Spartz, (Note: Despite being a member of the Republican Party, Spartz is not part of the House Republican Conference.) Andy Biggs, Tim Burchett, and Chip Roy. Roy also said that "Johnson does not yet have the support to be speaker."

=== Nominee ===
- Mike Johnson, incumbent speaker (2023–present) and representative from Louisiana's 4th congressional district (2017–present)

== Democratic nomination ==
Incumbent House minority leader Hakeem Jeffries was re-elected as Leader of the House Democratic Caucus by acclamation without opposition on November 19, 2024.

=== Nominee ===
- Hakeem Jeffries, House minority leader (2023–present) from New York's 8th congressional district (2013–present)

== Election of the speaker ==
Johnson addressing the House after his reelection

Democratic Caucus Chair Pete Aguilar nominated Jeffries while House Republican Conference Chair Lisa McClain nominated Johnson.

All Democrats voted for Jeffries. Initially, several Republican Representatives had not voted for Johnson: Thomas Massie voted for Tom Emmer, Ralph Norman voted for Jim Jordan, and Keith Self voted for Byron Donalds, while Andy Biggs, Michael Cloud, Andrew Clyde, Paul Gosar, Andy Harris, and Chip Roy (all of whom were undecided going into the vote) did not respond to the initial roll call vote. The clerk then called a second time the names of those who had not replied to the first call, and all six voted for Johnson. Johnson's vote count therefore stood at 216, two short of the required majority. However, after meeting with Johnson off the floor and receiving a phone call from Trump, Norman and Self shifted to supporting Johnson and changed their vote accordingly before the final result was declared.

Before the vote had officially concluded, Stacey Plaskett, the delegate representing the U.S. Virgin Islands, posed a parliamentary inquiry as to why she and other delegates representing U.S. territories and the District of Columbia were not called upon to participate in the speakership election. She then said the House and the nation has a territories and colonies problem.

2025 election for speaker (Note: Table shows first ballot vote tally after vote shifts; votes before shifts were: Mike Johnson – 216, Hakeem Jeffries – 215, Tom Emmer – 1, Byron Donalds – 1, and Jim Jordan – 1. (total votes: 434 / votes necessary: 218).) * denotes incumbent
| Party | Candidate | Votes | % |
|---|---|---|---|
| Republican | Mike Johnson* (LA-4) | 218 | 50.23 |
| Democratic | Hakeem Jeffries (NY-8) | 215 | 49.54 |
| Republican | Tom Emmer (MN-6) | 1 (Note: The single vote for Emmer was cast by Thomas Massie.) | 0.23 |
| Total votes | | 434 (Note: One seat (Florida's 1st congressional district) was vacant at the time of the election due to Matt Gaetz's resignation.) | 100 |
| Votes necessary | | 218 | >50 |

Graphic showing first ballot vote distribution after vote shifts

== See also ==
- 2024 Senate Republican Conference leadership election
