= 2024 Senate Republican Conference leadership election =

- November 13, 2024

53 Republican Senators and Senators-elect in the 119th Congress 27 votes needed for a majority
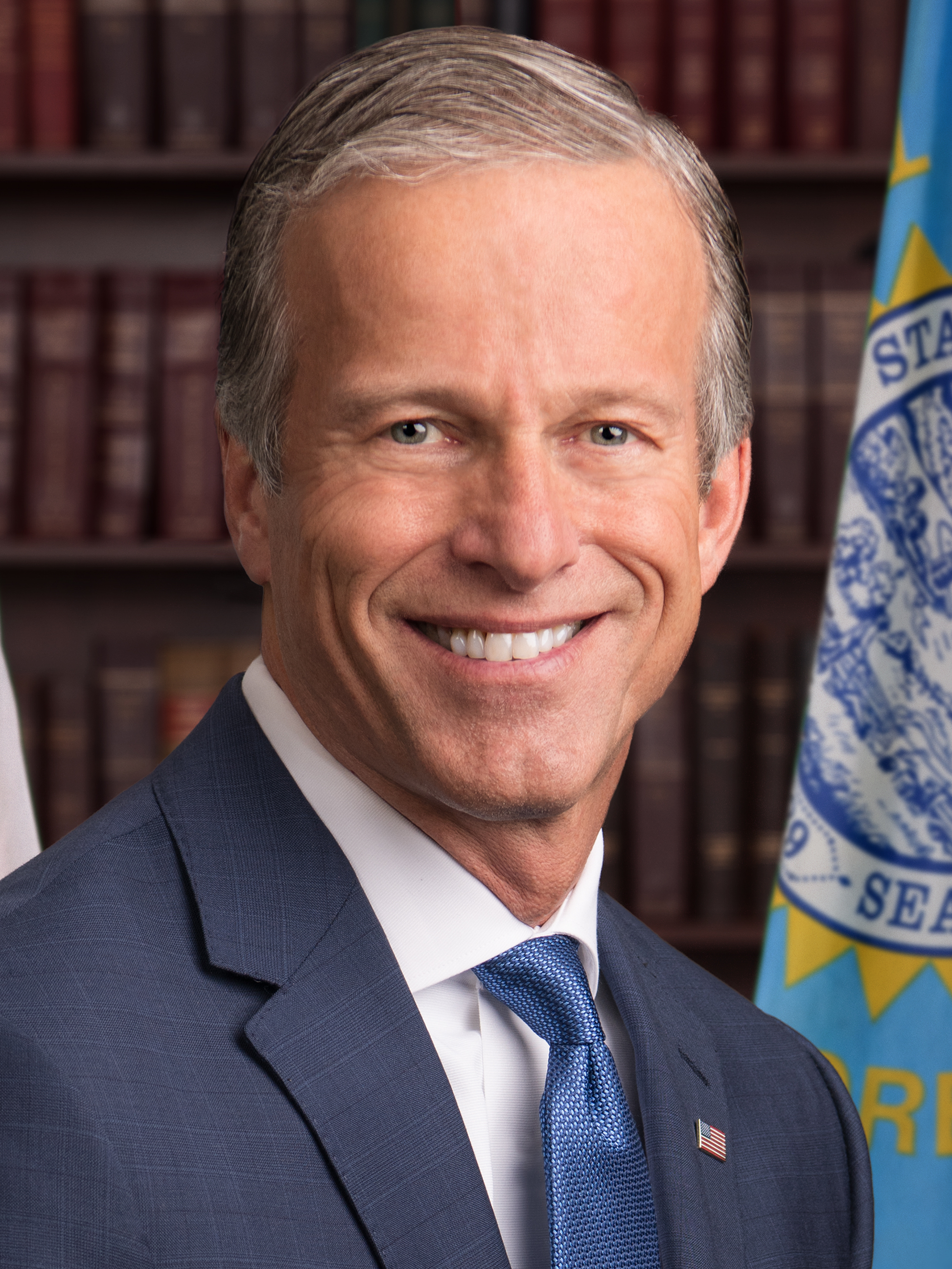

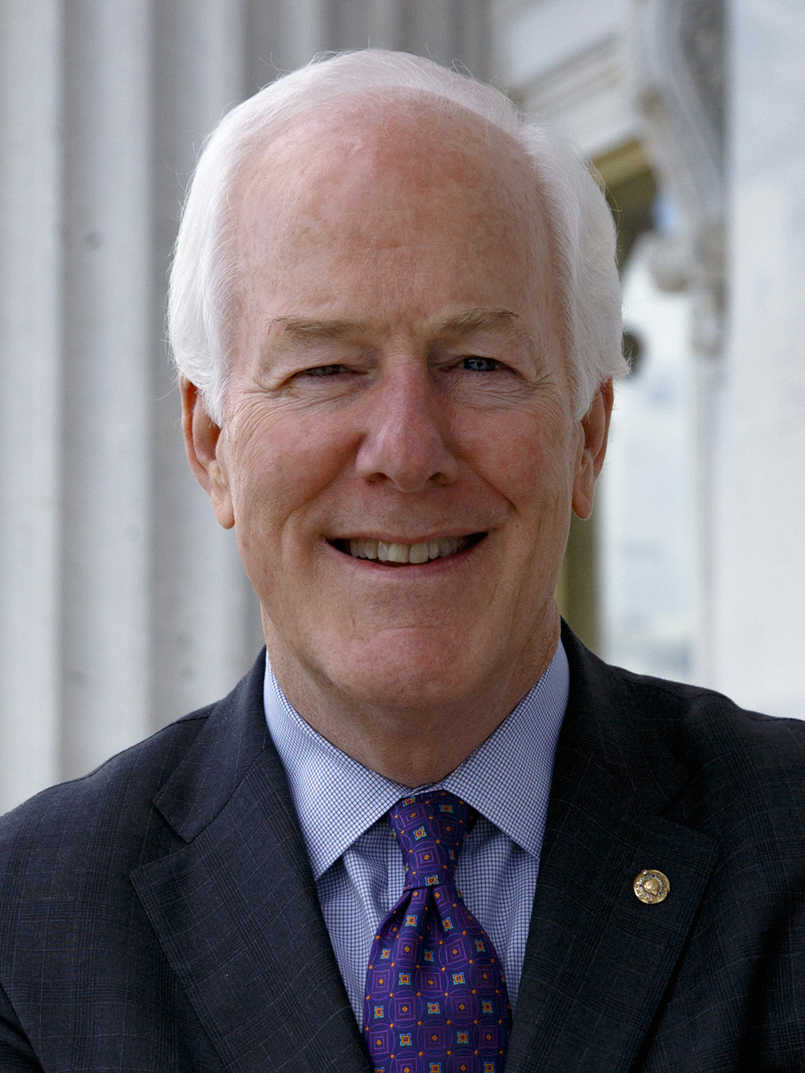

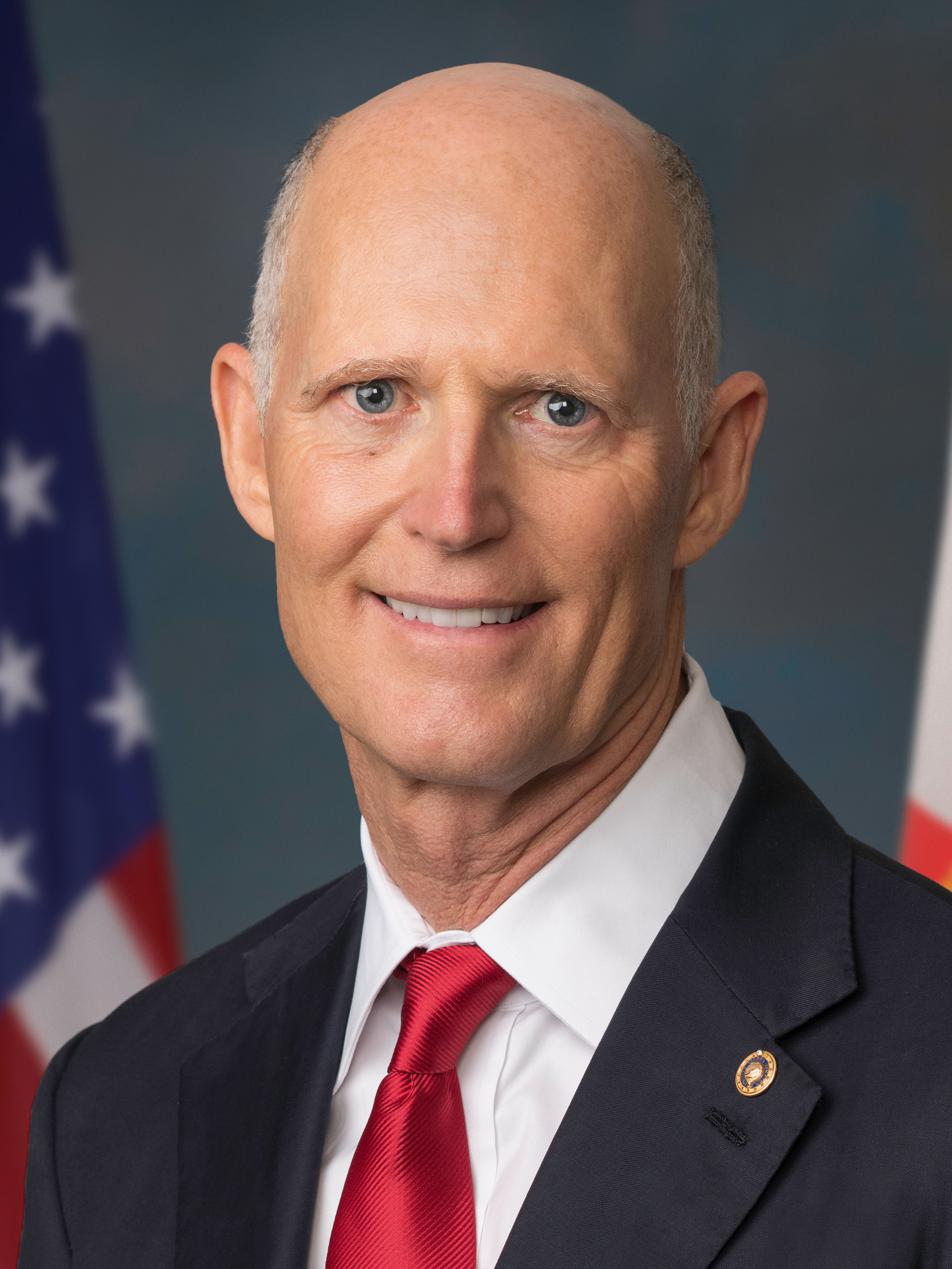
Candidate	John Thune	John Cornyn	Rick Scott
Home state	South Dakota	Texas	Florida
First ballot	23 (43.4%)	15 (28.3%)	13 (24.5%)
Second ballot	29 (54.7%)	24 (45.3%)	Eliminated
Leader before election
Mitch McConnell
Elected Leader
John Thune

On November 13, 2024, Republican members of the United States Senate held an election to determine the next leader of the Senate Republican Conference, who was to become the next majority leader of the United States Senate at the start of the 119th U.S. Congress. Republicans had regained control of the chamber in the 2024 election, flipping one Independent and three Democratic seats and securing a 53–47 majority.

Incumbent Republican leader Mitch McConnell of Kentucky, who has served in the position since 2007, announced in February 2024 that he would retire from the role at the start of the next session, triggering the election to succeed him. The election was held by secret ballot, with only those expected to serve as Republican senators in the 119th Congress allowed to cast a vote.

Senators John Cornyn, Rick Scott and John Thune were the only official candidates on the ballot. After receiving the fewest number of votes on the first ballot, Scott was eliminated. Thune won the election on the second ballot, after receiving a majority of the ballots cast.

== Overview ==
Senator Mitch McConnell, the leader of the Senate Republican Conference since 2007, announced in February 2024 that he would retire from his leadership position following the 2024 United States Senate elections. Those elections resulted in a Republican majority in the Senate, meaning the winner of the leadership election would become Senate majority leader.

The Senate majority leader serves as the chief representative of their party in the Senate, and is considered the most powerful member of the Senate. The Senate's executive and legislative business is also managed and scheduled by the majority leader.

Key issues for the election include the proposed implementation of term-limits for the Senate Republican leader, a proposed expansion of the leaders power over appointments to Senate committees and how to deal with then-president-elect Donald Trump's agenda.

The secret ballot election was held on November 13 by a conference of Republican senators. A candidate must receive a majority of votes cast to become leader; if no candidate receives a majority, the lowest vote getter is eliminated and the senators vote again.

== Candidates ==
The following candidates declared their intent to run.

Candidate	State	Other Senate roles	Ref.
John Cornyn	Texas (Served since 2002)	Republican Senate Whip (2013–2019); Chair of the National Republican Senatorial Committee (2009–2013)	
Rick Scott	Florida (Served since 2019)	Chair of the National Republican Senatorial Committee (2021–2023)	
John Thune	South Dakota (Served since 2005)	Republican Senate Whip (2019–2025); Chair of the Senate Commerce Committee (2015–2019); Chair of the Senate Republican Conference (2012–2019); Chair of the Senate Republican Policy Committee (2009–2012)	

=== Endorsements ===
John Cornyn

Senators

- Josh Hawley, Senator from Missouri (2019–present)
Rick Scott

Senators

- Marsha Blackburn, Senator from Tennessee (2019–present)
- Ted Cruz, Senator from Texas (2013–present)
- Bill Hagerty, Senator from Tennessee (2021–present)
- Ron Johnson, Senator from Wisconsin (2011–present)
- Mike Lee, Senator from Utah (2011–present)
- Rand Paul, Senator from Kentucky (2011–present)
- Marco Rubio, Senator from Florida (2011–2025)
- Tommy Tuberville, Senator from Alabama (2021–present)

U.S. Representatives

- Byron Donalds, U.S. Representative from FL-19 (2021–present)
- Marjorie Taylor Greene, U.S. Representative from GA-14 (2021–2026)
- Anna Paulina Luna, U.S. Representative from FL-13 (2023–present)

Notable individuals

- Steve Bannon, former executive chairman of Breitbart News
- Glenn Beck, conservative political commentator
- Tucker Carlson, conservative political commentator
- Benny Johnson, conservative political commentator
- Jesse Kelly, anti-communist radio host
- Megyn Kelly, conservative political commentator
- Robert F. Kennedy Jr., environmental lawyer and anti-vaccine activist
- Charlie Kirk, conservative political activist
- Laura Loomer, far-right political activist
- Elon Musk, businessman and investor
- Vivek Ramaswamy, American entrepreneur
- Matt Schlapp, conservative political activist
John Thune

Senators

- Kevin Cramer, Senator from North Dakota (2019–present)
- Steve Daines, Senator from Montana (2015–present)
- John Hoeven, Senator from North Dakota (2011–present)
- Markwayne Mullin, Senator from Oklahoma (2023–2026)
- Mike Rounds, Senator from South Dakota (2015–present)

== Results ==
Candidate	First Ballot		Second Ballot	
Candidate	Votes	Percent	Votes	Percent
John Thune	23	43.40%	29	54.72%
John Cornyn	15	28.30%	24	45.28%
Rick Scott	13	24.53%	Eliminated	
Write-in	2	3.77%	0	0.00%
Total	53	100.00%	53	100.00%
Source: Politico

== See also ==
- 2025 Speaker of the United States House of Representatives election#Republican nomination
