= Mike Johnson =

American lawyer and politician (born 1972)

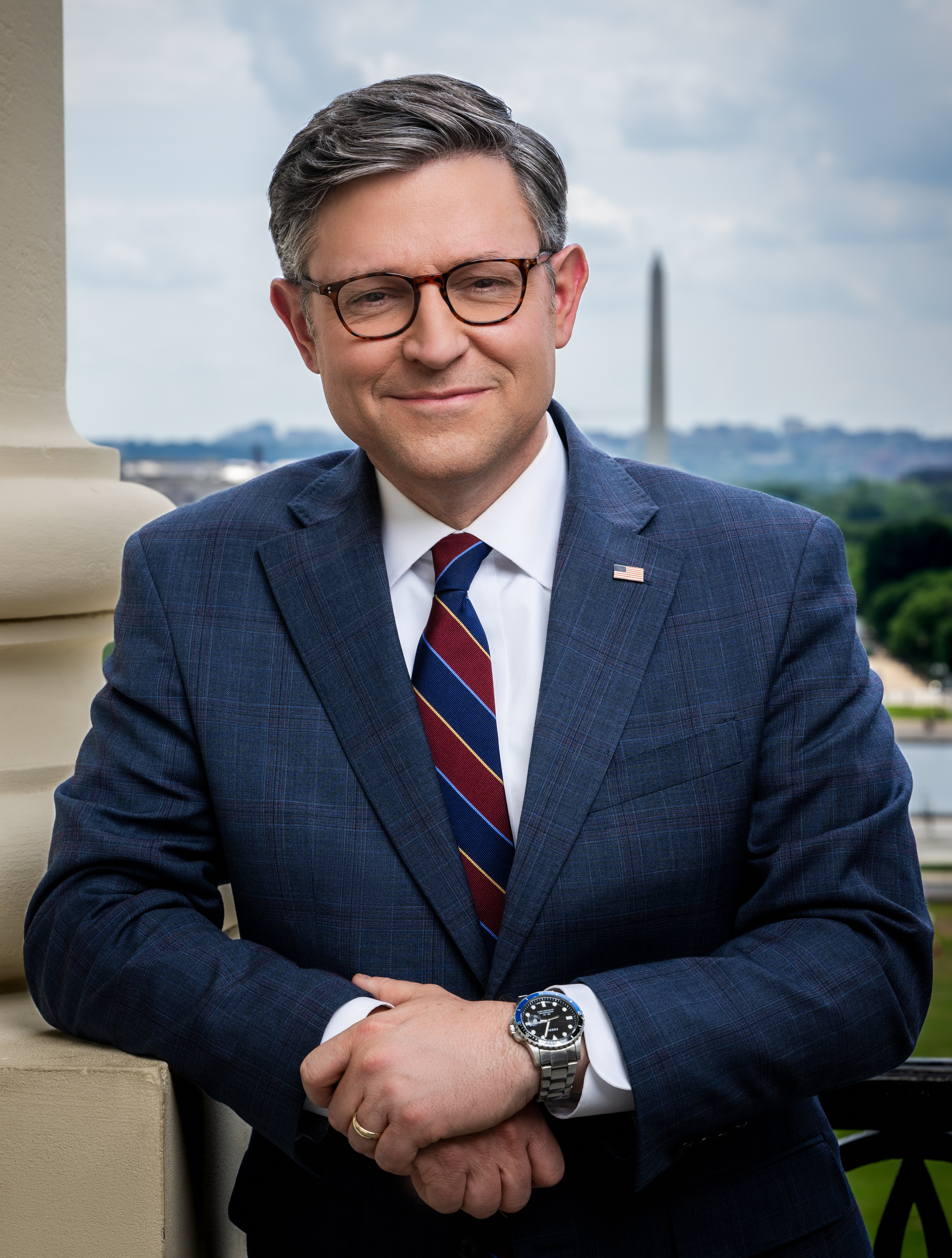
- Official portrait, 2024

56th Speaker of the United States House of Representatives
- Incumbent
- Assumed office October 25, 2023
- Preceded by: Kevin McCarthy (Note: Following McCarthy's removal as speaker on October 3, 2023, Patrick McHenry acted as speaker pro tempore until Johnson's election as speaker on October 25, 2023.)
House positions
Leader of the House Republican Conference
Outgoing
Assumed office October 25, 2023
Preceded by	Kevin McCarthy
Succeeded by	Jim Jordan (elect)
Vice Chair of the House Republican Conference
In office January 3, 2021 – October 25, 2023
Leader	Kevin McCarthy
Preceded by	Mark Walker
Succeeded by	Blake Moore
Chair of the Republican Study Committee
In office January 3, 2019 – January 3, 2021
Preceded by	Mark Walker
Succeeded by	Jim Banks

Member of the U.S. House of Representatives from Louisiana's 4th district
- Incumbent
- Assumed office January 3, 2017
- Preceded by: John Fleming

Member of the Louisiana House of Representatives from the 8th district
- In office February 22, 2015 – January 3, 2017
- Preceded by: Jeff R. Thompson
- Succeeded by: Raymond Crews

Personal details
- Born: James Michael Johnson; January 30, 1972 (age 54) Shreveport, Louisiana, U.S.
- Party: Republican
- Spouse: Kelly Lary (m. 1999)
- Children: 5 (Note: The Johnsons have four biological children and one adopted son.)
- Education: Louisiana State University (BS, JD)
- Website: House website Speaker website Campaign website
- Johnson's voice Johnson on naming a federal Post Office building after U.S. Representative-elect Luke Letlow; Recorded May 6, 2024

James Michael Johnson (born January 30, 1972) is an American lawyer and politician serving as the 56th speaker of the United States House of Representatives since 2023. A member of the Republican Party, he is in his fifth House term, having represented Louisiana's 4th congressional district since 2017. His district is based in Shreveport and includes much of the state's northwestern portion.

Johnson is a graduate of the Paul M. Hebert Law Center at Louisiana State University. Before entering politics, he worked as an attorney in private practice and for the Alliance Defending Freedom (ADF), a conservative Christian legal advocacy group. Johnson sat on the Ethics and Religious Liberty Commission of the Southern Baptist Convention between 2004 and 2012.

Johnson's political career began when he was elected to the Louisiana House of Representatives in 2015; he served in that body until 2017. He was first elected to represent Louisiana's 4th congressional district in 2016. During his time in Congress, he contested the results of the 2020 presidential election on the House floor and in court. A social conservative, Johnson supported bills to ban abortion nationwide. Johnson chaired the Republican Study Committee, the largest caucus of conservatives in Congress, from 2019 to 2021. He was vice chair of the House Republican Conference from 2021 to 2023.

On October 25, 2023, after Kevin McCarthy was ousted as speaker of the House, Johnson was elected to replace him, the first Louisianan to hold the post. He was narrowly reelected to a full term as speaker in 2025. After the 2026 midterm elections, in which Republicans lost their House majority, Johnson announced that he would not run for House Republican leader in the next session of Congress, and will be replaced by Jim Jordan.

== Early life and education ==
James Michael Johnson was born in Shreveport, Louisiana, on January 30, 1972, as the eldest of four children of Jeanne (née Messina; born 1954) and James Patrick "Pat" Johnson (1953–2016). Johnson's parents first dated in middle school, and remained throughout high school where they concieved him and afterwards dropped out and got married. According to Johnson, a lot of people tried convincing his mother to get an abortion, but that she ultimately decided to choose life.

From his mother's side of the family, Johnson is of Italian descent; his maternal grandfather, Nunzio Messina, was the son of Sicilian immigrants, Rosa Cicero and Salvatore "Sam" Messina Sr, who both immigrated to Louisiana from Palermo, Sicily. From his father's side, Johnson is of predominantly English, French, and Irish descent, with deep roots in the American South going back generations.

Johnson is a graduate of Captain Shreve High School in Shreveport. In 1995, he earned a Bachelor of Science in business administration from Louisiana State University, becoming a first-generation college graduate. In 1998, Johnson graduated from Louisiana State's Paul M. Hebert Law Center with a Juris Doctor degree.

== Legal career ==
Johnson was a constitutional lawyer before entering politics. From 2002 to 2010, he was an attorney for the Alliance Defense Fund, now known as the Alliance Defending Freedom, a socially conservative legal advocacy group that subscribes to the legal theory of constitutionalism. In 2004, he defended Louisiana Amendment 1, which defined marriage as between one man and one woman within the Louisiana Constitution, against legal challenges.

In August 2010, Johnson was named the "founding dean" of the newly established Pressler School of Law at Louisiana College. The law school never opened, and Johnson resigned in August 2012. Joe Aguillard, accused by a university vice president of misappropriating money and lying to the board, blamed Johnson's resignation for the law school's failure. The college soon terminated Aguillard, as it was determined he "engaged in numerous improprieties and falsities in his representations not only to school donors, but to the Board of Trustees". The parent college has since been embroiled in administrative and legal problems.

From 2004 to 2012, Johnson was on the Ethics and Religious Liberty Commission of the Southern Baptist Convention.

In 2015, Johnson founded Freedom Guard, a nonprofit law firm that engaged in religious liberty litigation. He was its chief counsel. During his time at Freedom Guard, he "defended the sports chaplaincy program at Louisiana State University from attacks that it was unconstitutional." Also, when Kentucky officials withdrew millions of dollars of tax breaks from the Ark Encounter theme park in Williamstown, Kentucky, Johnson represented Ark Encounter and its owner, Answers in Genesis, in a 2015 federal lawsuit. The court ruled in favor of Answers in Genesis, saying the state's exclusion of the ark from the tourism tax incentive based on its "religious purpose and message" violated the First Amendment. After the ruling, Johnson said: "The court has affirmed a longstanding principle that the Constitution does not permit a state to show hostility towards religion. The First Amendment does not allow Christian organizations to be treated like second-class citizens merely because of what they believe."

In 2018, Johnson became an adjunct professor teaching online courses at Liberty University's Helms School of Government. From roughly 2015 to 2022, he was an occasional guest host of Tony Perkins's radio talk show Washington Watch.

== Louisiana House of Representatives ==
The 8th District seat of the Louisiana House of Representatives was vacated in 2015 when Jeff R. Thompson was elected to a state district judgeship. Johnson ran to succeed him and was unopposed.

In April 2015, Johnson proposed the Marriage and Conscience Act. It would have prevented the state from engaging in adverse treatment of any person or entity based upon their beliefs about marriage. Critics denounced the bill as an attempt to protect people who discriminate against same-sex married couples. Governor Bobby Jindal pledged to sign Johnson's bill into law if it passed the legislature, commenting in a New York Times editorial that "musicians, caterers, photographers and others should be immune from government coercion on deeply held religious convictions". IBM and other employers in the region expressed opposition to the bill, including concerns about hiring difficulties it would likely produce. Other politicians also objected, including Republican Baton Rouge Metro Councilman John Delgado, who called Johnson a "despicable bigot of the highest order" for proposing the bill. Johnson replied that he "wished Delgado had taken the time to review his record and career before making 'such hateful, wildly inaccurate statements'".

On May 19, 2015, the House Civil Law and Procedure Committee voted 10–2 to table the bill, effectively ending its chances to become law. Both Republicans and Democrats voted against the bill; other than Johnson, only Republican Ray Garofalo voted for it. In response, Jindal issued an executive order to enforce its intent.

In 2016, Johnson was a strong proponent of a movement, outlined in Article V of the Constitution, to amend the United States Constitution at a national convention called for that purpose. He helped lead the Louisiana House in formally petitioning Congress to call a "Convention of States" to overhaul the Constitution. He later held hearings on this proposal in Congress.

== U.S. House of Representatives ==
=== Elections ===
On February 10, 2016, Johnson announced his candidacy for the 4th congressional district seat, which had been held for eight years by John Fleming. Fleming was running for the United States Senate seat vacated by David Vitter. Johnson won the December 10 runoff, defeating Democratic nominee Marshall Jones, 87,370 votes (65%) to 46,579 (35%).

In 2018, Johnson won a second House term, defeating Democratic nominee Ryan Trundle, 139,307 votes (64%) to 72,923 votes (34%).

In 2020, Johnson won a third House term with 185,265 votes (60%) to Democratic nominee Kenny Houston's 78,157 votes (25%).

In 2022, Johnson won reelection unopposed.

In 2024, Johnson was reelected with 262,821 votes (86%) to Joshua Morott's 43,427 (14%).

Johnson was reelected in 2026 with 58% of the vote.

=== Early tenure ===
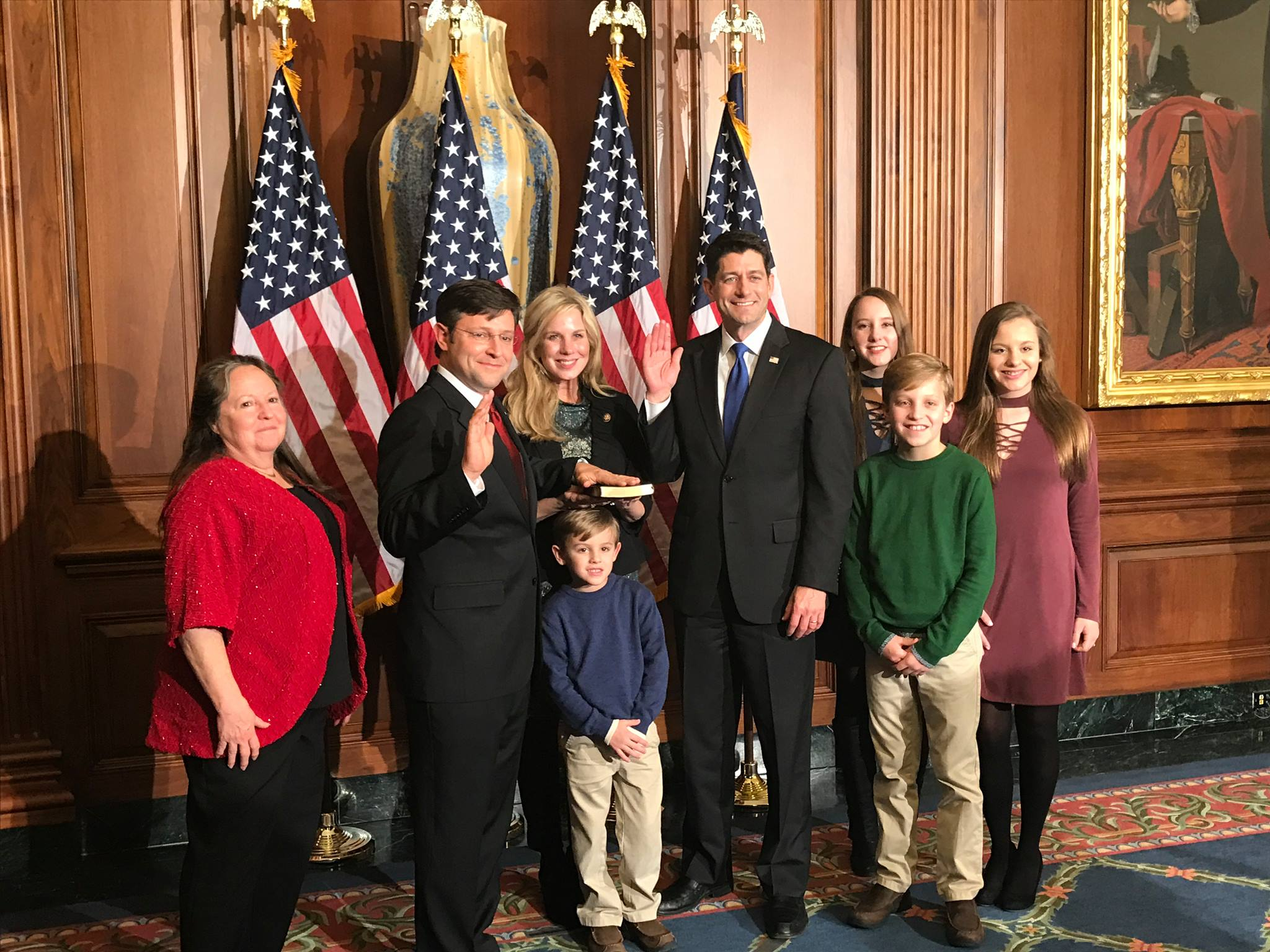
Johnson being sworn into his freshman term on January 3, 2017, by Paul Ryan

Johnson was sworn into office as a member of Congress on January 3, 2017. He has served as a deputy whip for House Republicans, as a member of the Judiciary Committee, and as a member of the Armed Services Committee. From 2019 to 2021, Johnson chaired the Republican Study Committee. Johnson served as vice chair of the House Republican Conference from 2021 to 2023. He was supported by the House Freedom Caucus PAC and frequently attended House Freedom Caucus meetings without formally joining the Caucus.

Johnson was among 147 Republicans who voted to overturn the 2020 presidential election results.

Johnson has worked closely with the Christian groups Answers in Genesis, Louisiana Family Forum, Alliance Defending Freedom, and Focus on the Family.

In 2022, Johnson wrote the foreword to Louisiana politics blogger Scott McKay's book The Revivalist Manifesto. The book uses homophobic slurs to refer to Pete Buttigieg and implicitly endorses the debunked Pizzagate conspiracy theory. Johnson promoted the book on his podcast, saying, "I obviously believe in the product, or I wouldn't have written the foreword. So I endorse the work." But after he was elected Speaker of the House, a spokesperson for Johnson told CNN, "The Speaker had never read the passages highlighted in the CNN story, which he strongly disagrees with. He wrote the foreword as a favor to a friend, supportive of the general theme of the book but not as an endorsement of all the opinions expressed."

After the 2022 midterm elections, Representative Andy Biggs proposed Johnson as a possible compromise candidate for Speaker of the House instead of Republican Conference leader Kevin McCarthy, after members of the House Freedom Caucus opposed McCarthy's bid for the speakership.

In 2023, Johnson became chair of the House Judiciary Subcommittee on the Constitution and Limited Government.

=== Committee assignments ===
The following is a list of Johnson's former committee assignments before becoming Speaker:

- Committee on the Judiciary
  - Subcommittee on the Constitution and Limited Government (chair)
  - Subcommittee on Administrative State, Regulatory Reform, and Antitrust
  - Subcommittee on Courts, Intellectual Property and the Internet
  - Select Subcommittee on the Weaponization of the Federal Government
- Committee on Armed Services
  - Subcommittee on Readiness
  - Subcommittee on Cyber, Innovative Technologies and Information Systems

=== Caucus memberships ===
- Republican Study Committee
- Congressional Taiwan Caucus
- Congressional Western Caucus

=== Speaker of the House ===
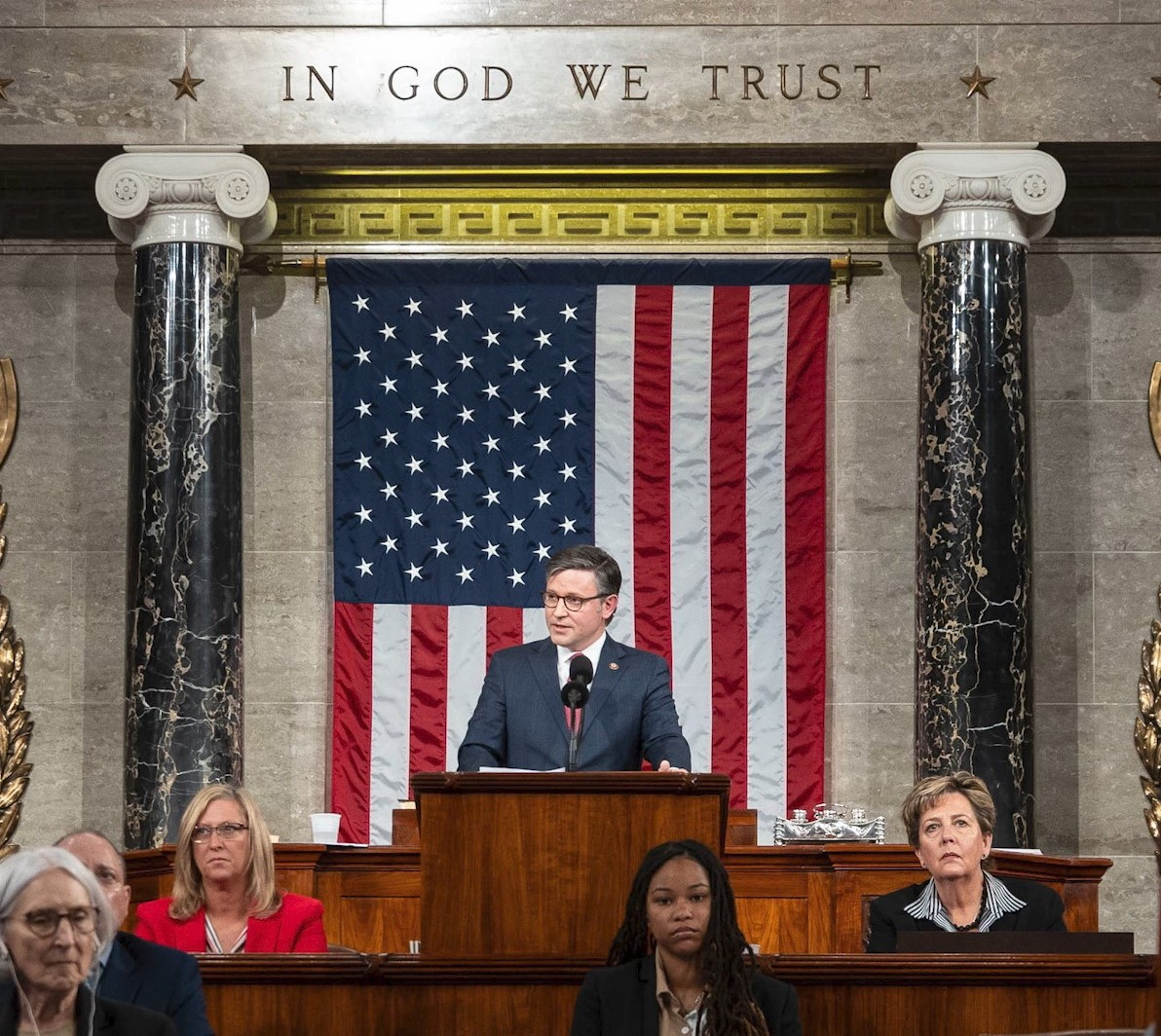
Johnson delivers remarks following his election as Speaker of the House.

==== Nomination ====
After Kevin McCarthy was removed from the position of speaker of the House on October 3, 2023, Representative Matt Gaetz floated Johnson's name as a potential replacement. On October 13, Johnson said that he would not run in the upcoming speaker election to succeed McCarthy and endorsed colleague Jim Jordan; on the same day, NBC News reported that Johnson was considering running if Jordan dropped out.

On October 21, after Steve Scalise and Jordan had made unsuccessful bids for speaker, Johnson declared his candidacy to become the new Republican nominee for speaker but was beaten by Representative Tom Emmer on October 24. Emmer defeated Johnson, 117 votes to 97, on the fifth ballot. Shortly thereafter, Emmer withdrew his candidacy for the speakership. Later on the same day, House Republicans voted to make Johnson their fourth nominee for speaker; he beat write-in candidate Kevin McCarthy and Representative Byron Donalds, 128 votes to 43 and 29, on the third ballot. Johnson's bid was endorsed by former U.S. president Donald Trump.

On October 25, the full House voted, 220–209, to elect Johnson as the 56th Speaker of the United States House of Representatives with every Republican member in attendance voting for him. Johnson was also sworn in as speaker on the same day. He is the first speaker in U.S. history from Louisiana. Johnson had served the shortest tenure of any House member elected speaker, at six years and ten months, since John G. Carlisle in 1883. Delivering his first remarks as speaker, he said, "I believe that Scripture, the Bible, is very clear: that God is the one who raises up those in authority. He raised up each of you. All of us."

==== 118th Congress ====
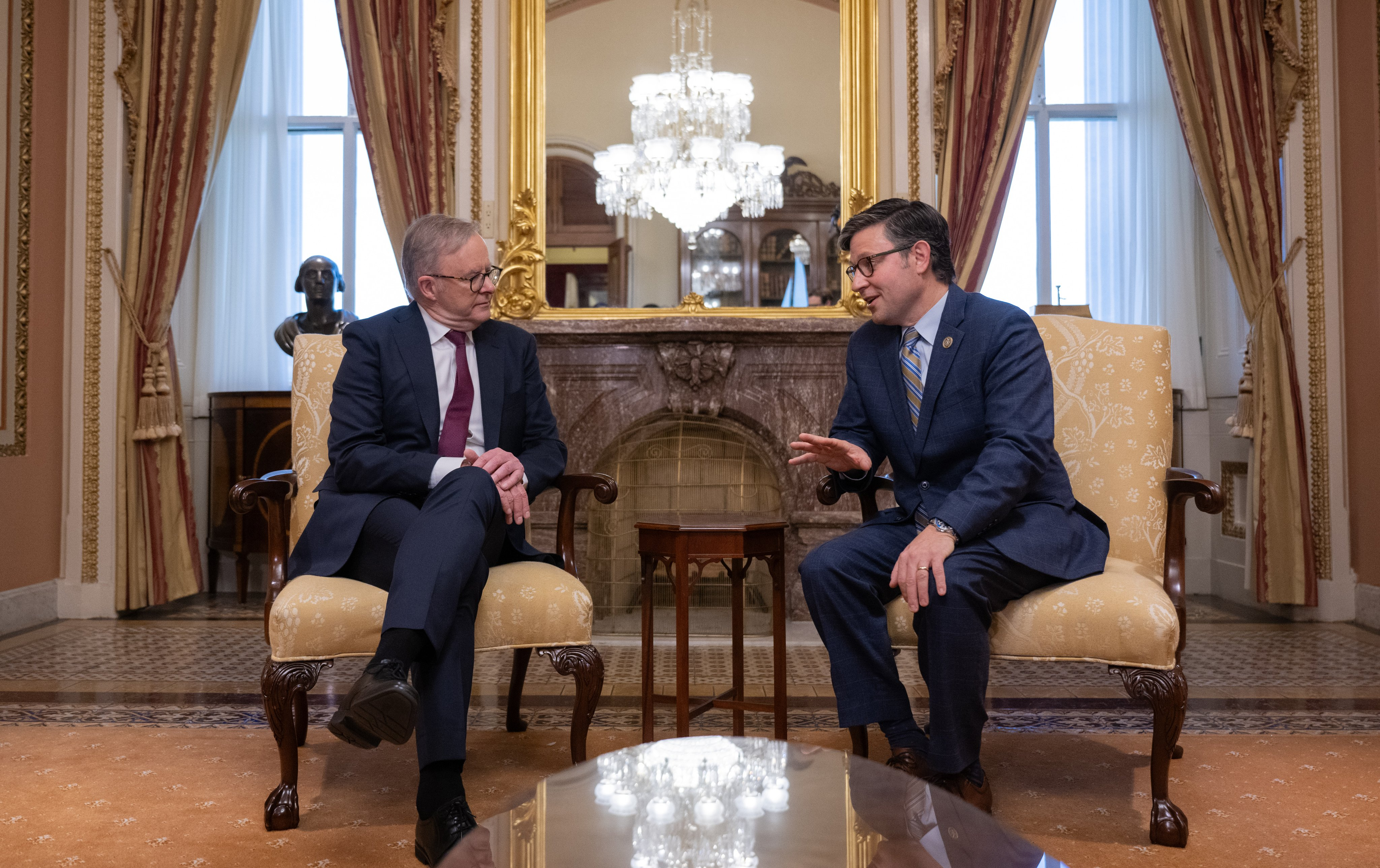
Johnson meets with Australian prime minister Anthony Albanese, October 26, 2023

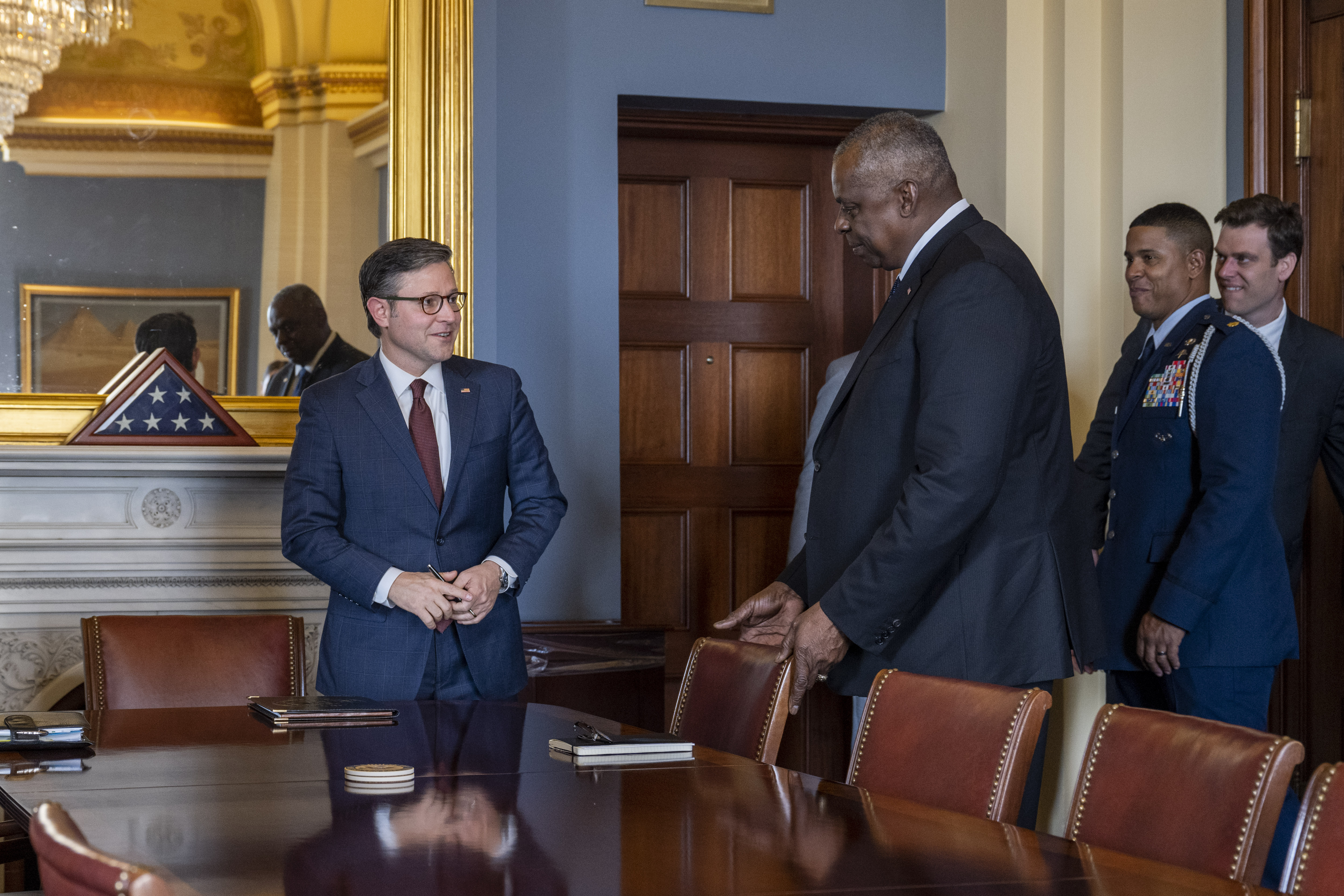
Johnson meets with Defense Secretary Lloyd Austin, November 1, 2023

In the first half of the 118th Congress, when McCarthy was speaker, the House of Representatives had passed into law the lowest number of bills of any previous Congress, partially due to the unrest among members of the Freedom Caucus and McCarthy. McCarthy's removal had not put an end to the divided House, and Johnson sparked some anger over his handling of spending negotiations. An effort to oust him from the speakership in May 2024 failed with two-thirds of the House voting to keep him in office.

On October 26, 2023, Johnson met with President Joe Biden for the first time as speaker before attending a bipartisan briefing held at the White House on the administration's proposed funding requests for aid to Ukraine and Israel. On October 30, Johnson suggested rescinding IRS funding from the Inflation Reduction Act to provide Israel $14.3 billion in aid. In November, Johnson proposed a two-tiered stopgap bill that continued spending at levels similar to then-current levels. House conservatives and the Freedom Caucus opposed the bill, but it passed the House on November 14 with the support of 209 Democrats and 127 Republicans. It passed the Senate the next day and was signed by Biden.

On November 17, Johnson announced that 44,000 hours of security footage from the January 6 United States Capitol attack, all of which had previously only been available upon request from criminal defendants and the media, would be released to the general public.

On December 1, the House expelled Republican congressman George Santos by a 311–114 vote; Johnson voted against the expulsion, and called it "a regrettable day".

On February 13, 2024, the House impeached Secretary of Homeland Security Alejandro Mayorkas by a 214–213 vote. The impeachment resolution, championed by Johnson, had been already put up to a vote on February 6, but had failed due to a small Republican rebellion.

On January 7, 2024, congressional appropriators reached an agreement on the topline spending levels for 2024 that was not substantially different from the deal McCarthy negotiated during his tenure as speaker. Hardliners attempted to push Johnson to abandon the deal, initially claiming that he had done so before Johnson clarified that he had not. As negotiations continued over the full-year funding bills, conservatives pushed Johnson to instead endorse a full-year continuing resolution, which under McCarthy's deal would result in automatic spending cuts.

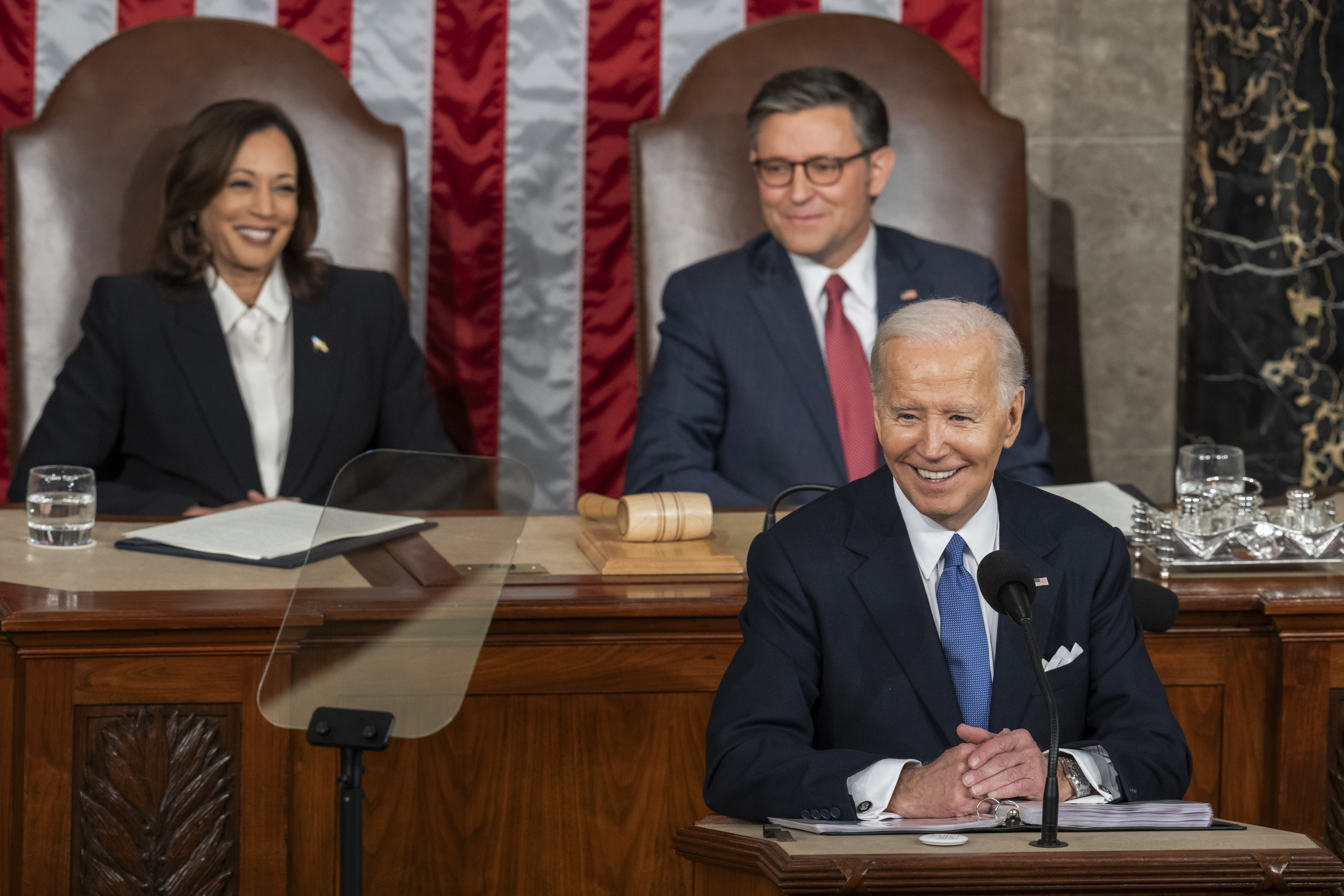
President Joe Biden during his 2024 State of the Union Address with Johnson and Vice President Harris

On March 6, 2024, the House passed a $459 billion "minibus" spending package containing six of the twelve appropriations bills. The rightmost faction of the Republican conference harshly opposed the deal, arguing it contained no substantial conservative policy wins. On March 22, the House passed a second $741 billion minibus to fund the remaining government departments; most Republicans voted against the bill, but it passed with Democratic support. The bill's passage, and the decision to rely on Democratic votes to get it through, led Representative Marjorie Taylor Greene to file a motion to vacate Johnson's speakership. Greene could have forced a vote on the motion immediately, but initially chose not to, saying that she merely intended to send Johnson "a warning".

In April 2024, more than two months after the Senate had passed a funding bill for Israel, Taiwan, and Ukraine, Johnson put forward a legislative package providing aid to the three countries in separate bills, each of which passed Congress with bipartisan support and large majorities and was signed into law by President Biden. The legislative package also included a House-passed bill to force the app TikTok to divest from its Chinese Communist Party-controlled parent company, ByteDance, as well as the REPO for Ukrainians Act, a measure that allows the U.S. government to fund the Ukrainian war effort with assets seized from Russian oligarchs.

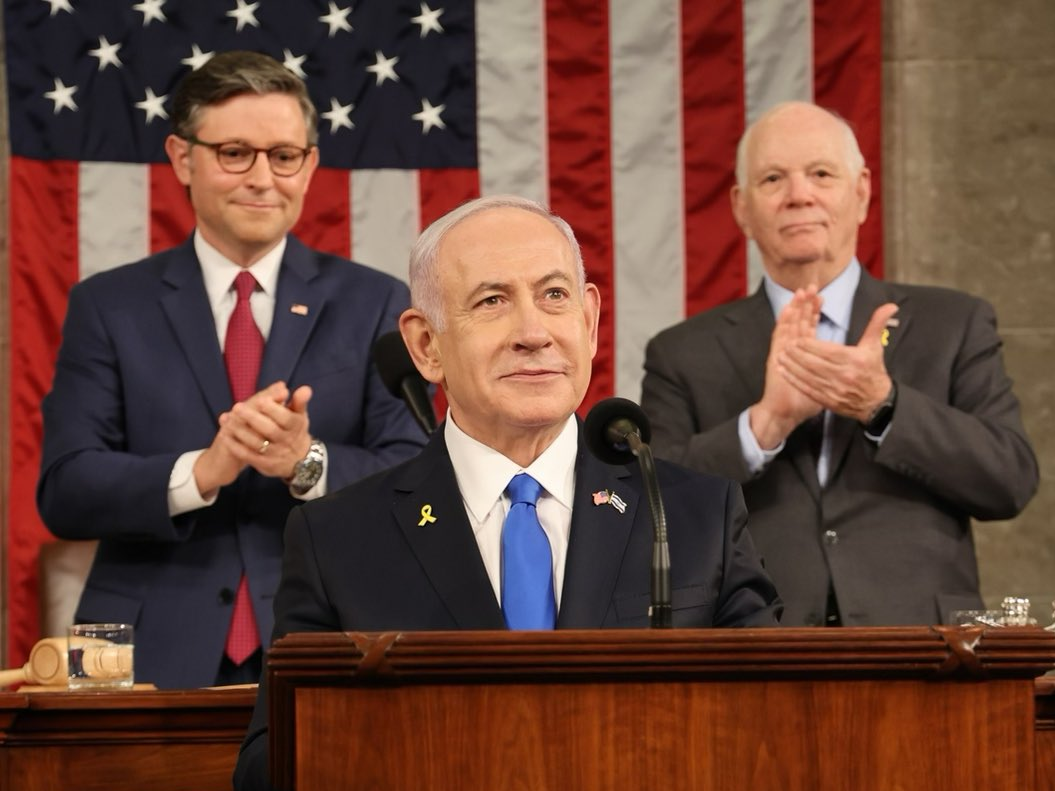
Israeli Prime Minister Benjamin Netanyahu addresses a joint session of Congress with Johnson and Senator Ben Cardin, July 24, 2024

On May 8, 2024, Greene (who had strongly opposed Johnson's resolve to provide Ukraine with further aid) introduced a motion to vacate Johnson's speakership on the floor, forcing a vote on it within two legislative days. The House voted to table (kill) the motion by a vote of 359 to 43, allowing Johnson to remain speaker. One hundred ninety-six Republicans and 163 Democrats voted to kill the resolution; 11 Republicans and 32 Democrats voted against killing it. The Democrats who supported Johnson said they did so because of the vital role he had played in providing funding for the federal government and for Ukraine.

The 118th Congress, in which Johnson and McCarthy each served as speaker, saw 209 bills enacted into law, among the fewest bills passed by any Congress in decades. Since 2000, the average number of bills passed per Congress had been 372. Since 1989, the average number had been 380. No Congress had enacted fewer laws since the first half of the 20th century.

==== 119th Congress ====
In the 2024 elections, Republicans maintained control of the House, flipped control of the U.S. Senate, and won the presidency, yielding an undivided Republican government. On January 3, 2025, the opening day of the 119th Congress, Johnson was reelected speaker on the first ballot. Every House Republican except Thomas Massie voted for Johnson, and every House Democrat voted for House Minority Leader Hakeem Jeffries.

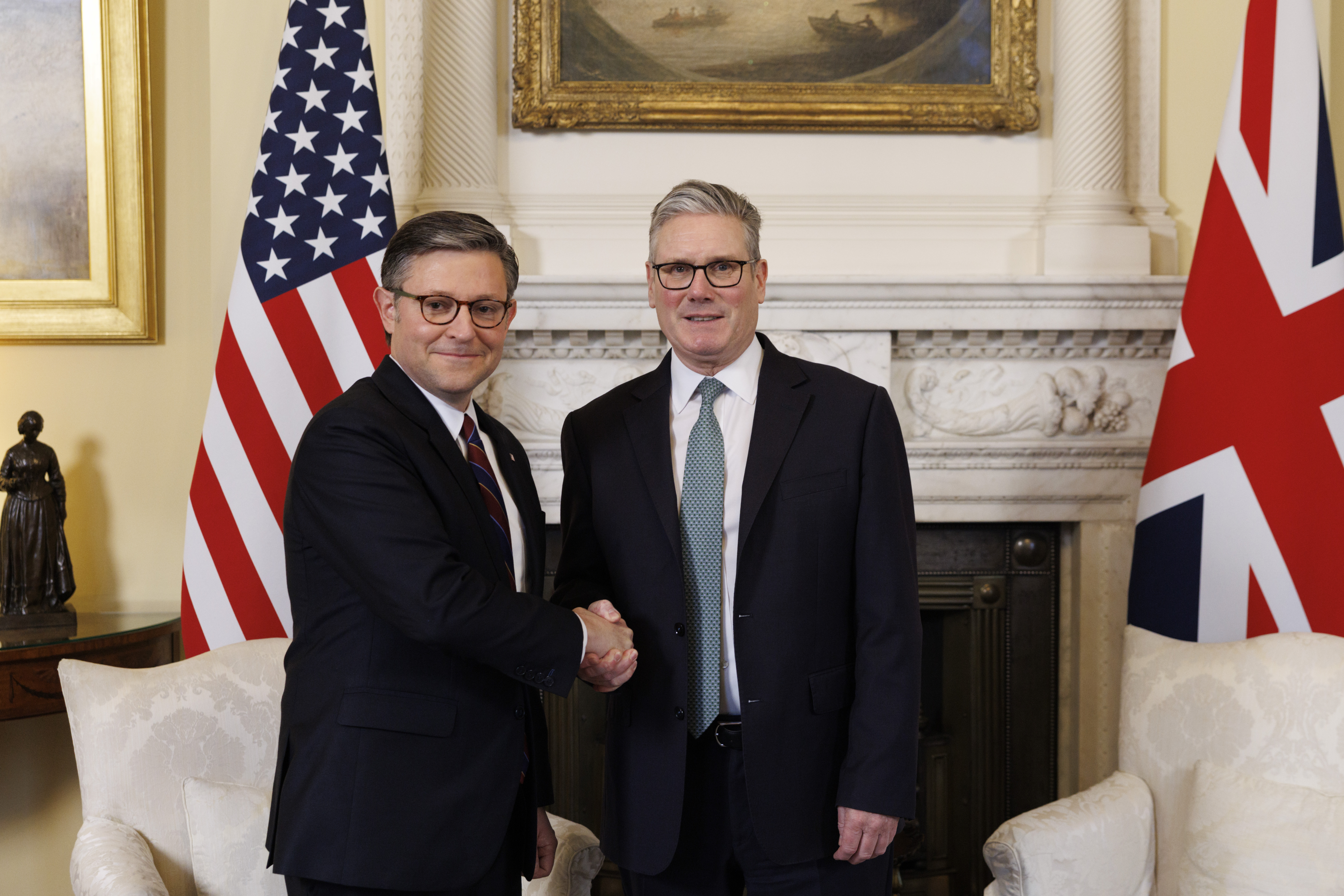
UK Prime Minister Keir Starmer hosting Johnson at 10 Downing Street on January 19, 2026

In early January, as Trump was transitioning to the presidency, Johnson and House Republicans reached an agreement to raise the debt ceiling by $1.5 trillion to fulfill Trump's legislative prospects. This agreement was reached after Trump called for Congress to craft "one powerful bill"—a request he later retracted—to deal with energy, the southern border, and taxes. When asked whether cuts to Social Security and Medicare would be part of Trump's agenda, Johnson said they would not.

In March, Johnson said Congress could defund, restructure, or eliminate federal courts in response to rulings against Trump's policies.

In May, Johnson supported Trump's use of the National Guard and Marines to quell the 2025 Los Angeles protests, adding: "I'm not going to give you legal analysis on whether [California governor] Gavin Newsom should be arrested, but he ought to be tarred and feathered."

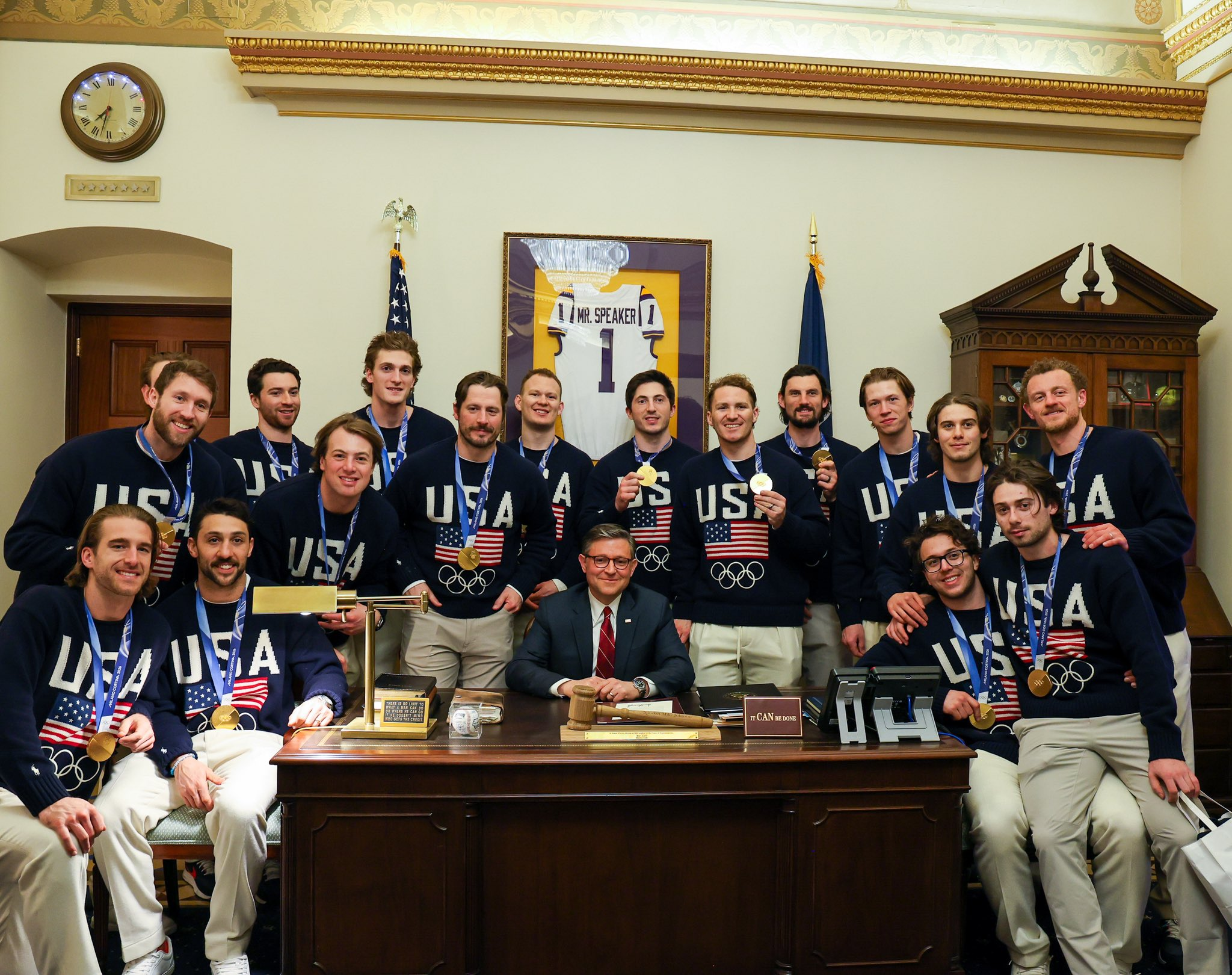
Johnson greets the 2026 Olympic gold-medal-winning U.S. Men's Hockey team in Washington, D.C., on February 24, 2026.

In mid-July, Johnson said of the federal investigation into Jeffrey Epstein: "We should put everything out there and let the people decide". But after Trump called for the Epstein matter to be dropped, Johnson changed his position within a week, arguing that the Trump administration needed "space to do what it is doing". In late July, to prevent House votes on releasing Epstein-related information, Johnson adjourned the House earlier than originally scheduled (for its five-week summer break).

Johnson delayed the swearing-in of Adelita Grijalva after she was elected in a special election on September 23 to represent Arizona's 7th congressional district. Johnson said he would not swear Grijalva in until the government shutdown ends. In contrast, James Walkinshaw, Jimmy Patronis, and Randy Fine, who were similarly elected in special elections during the 119th Congress, were sworn on the day after they won their special elections. The day the shutdown ended, Johnson swore in Grijalva.

After Republicans lost their House majority in the 2026 elections. Johnson told staff he would not seek reelection as leader. He will be replaced in the 120th Congress by Jim Jordan.

==== Assessments of speakership ====
When Johnson became House speaker, he was the least experienced representative to fill the office in 140 years. Axios wrote that Johnson's "status as a relatively unknown figure outside Capitol Hill meant he had few enemies to derail his campaign." Representative Ken Buck, a Republican from Colorado, echoed this sentiment, saying Johnson had won the speakership "because he has the fewest enemies of anybody in the Republican Party".

In May 2024, Politico wrote that Johnson had aligned himself with former President Trump "while not being treated like a golden retriever" and that he had "fortified his reputation in consequential ways. Substantively, Johnson is an authentic movement conservative" who has been "successful in isolating his critics". According to Politico, he has "proved deft in recent months at handling his members." House Republicans have praised him for keeping his word and avoiding "making promises he can't keep", while he has operated in good faith with Democrats and "stayed respectful of the opposition".

In May 2024, conservative columnist Marc Thiessen wrote in The Washington Post that "Johnson has gone from accidental House speaker to one of the most consequential House speakers in a generation" and that despite presiding over the smallest House majority in U.S. history, Johnson had become "one of the most effective speakers ever".

In a Washington Times editorial, former Republican speaker Newt Gingrich wrote that he was "deeply impressed" with Johnson, who he believes is "doing an excellent job" despite having "the most challenging speakership since the Civil War".

Former Democratic speaker Nancy Pelosi said she respected Johnson and that "we have not that much in common, philosophically, but if you can trust somebody to be a person of his or her word you can find common ground."

In July 2024, the editorial board at The Wall Street Journal published an opinion piece titled "Mike Johnson, Leader of the Free World", in which it wrote that in a recent speech at the Hudson Institute, Johnson "laid down a marker for a GOP that rejects U.S. decline and retreat abroad... He didn't indulge a false choice between meeting problems at home and threats abroad. He is pushing his party in the direction of Ronald Reagan, which is correct for the world moment and politically popular."

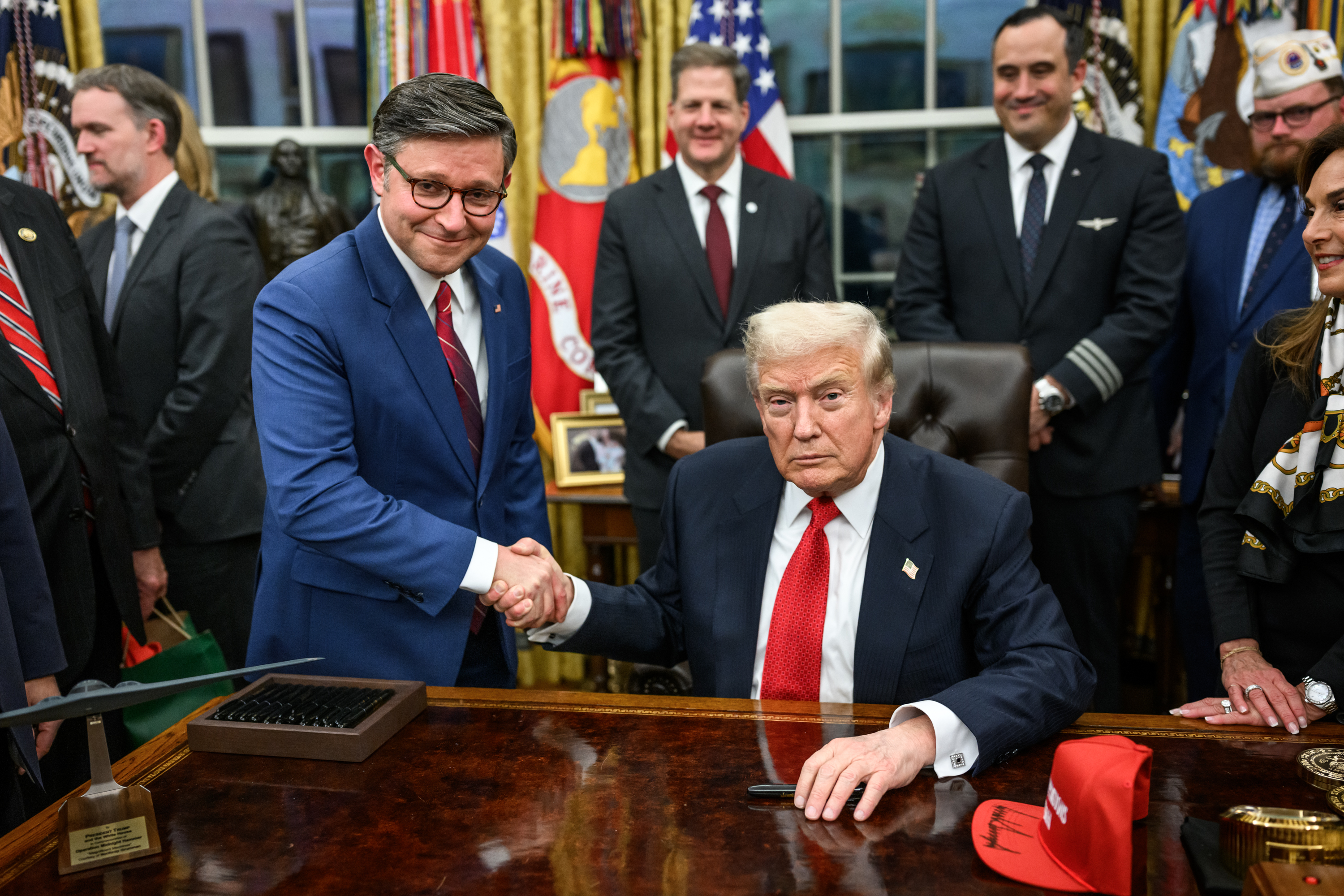
Johnson at the signing of Public Law 119-37 which ended the 2025 federal government shutdown

During the 2025 United States federal government shutdown, Johnson kept the House of Representatives largely in recess and did not hold votes on funding legislation. New York Times journalist Annie Karni wrote that Johnson largely deferred to the president during the second Trump presidency by not holding oversight hearings and holding the House out of session. Johnson had limited control over his members and instead, according to Karni, made "himself subservient to Mr. Trump".

During Johnson's speakership, use of the discharge petition has increased.

==== Role of the House ====
In May 2025, when asked about the Qatari jet N7478D, Johnson responded, "I'm going to leave it to the administration. They know much more about the details of that, OK? I'm just—it's not my lane." In July 2025, he adjourned the House early to prevent action on the relationship of Donald Trump and Jeffrey Epstein, saying, "there's no purpose for Congress to push an administration to do something that they're already doing". During the 2025 shutdown, Johnson refused to call the House into session and was described as having "spent much of the shutdown appearing daily at news conferences" defending Trump and insisting that the House had nothing to do but wait in an effort "to render the House irrelevant".

== Political positions ==
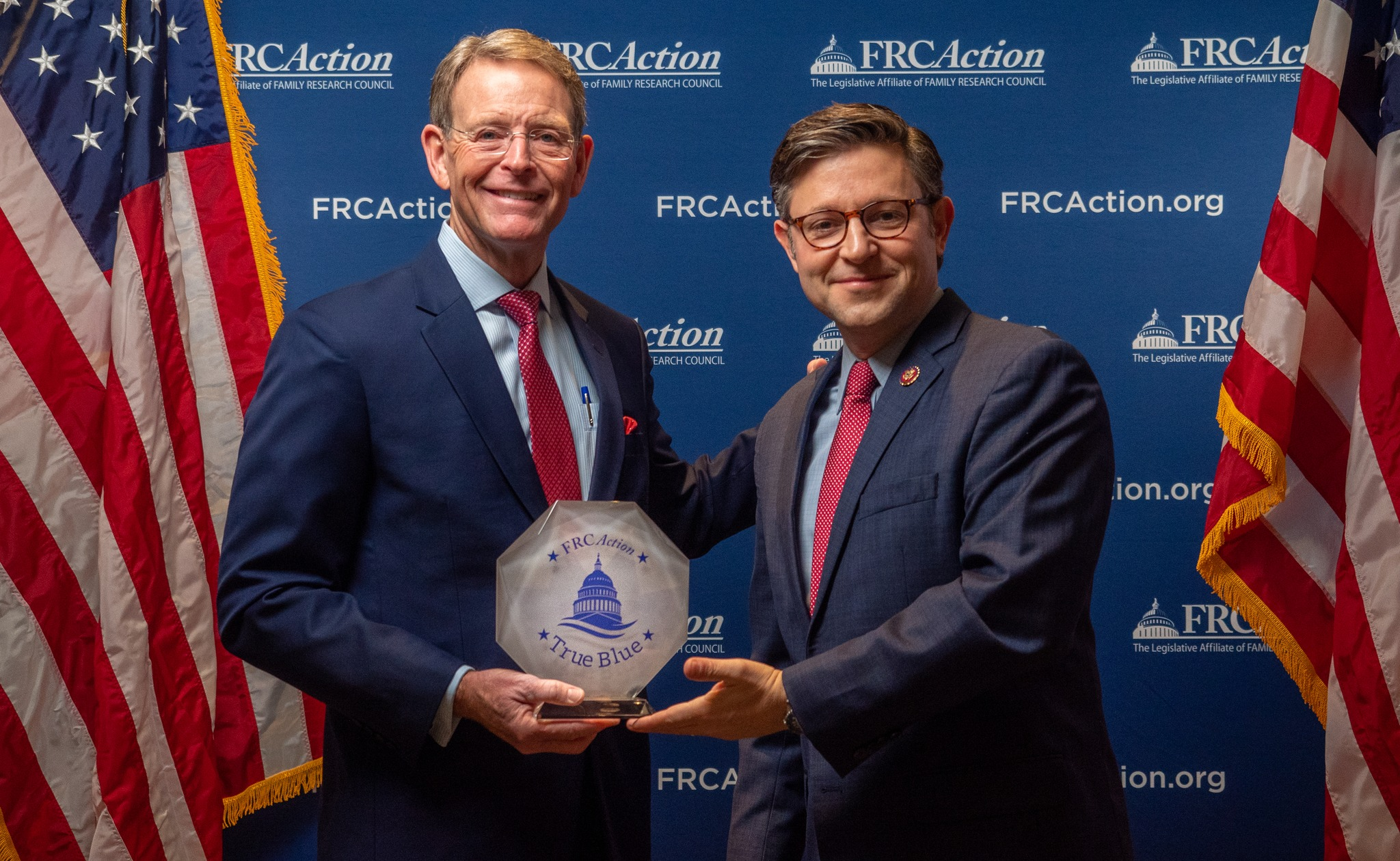
Johnson receiving the True Blue award from Family Research Council President Tony Perkins, March 1, 2023

Johnson is a Christian conservative and ultraconservative associated with the Christian right and New Apostolic Reformation.

=== 2020 presidential election ===
In early November 2020, after many pollsters and media outlets called the 2020 United States presidential election in favor of Joe Biden over Donald Trump, Johnson said that he spoke to Trump twice, recounting that he urged Trump to "exhaust every available legal remedy to restore Americans' trust in the fairness of our election system" and that he was heartened by Trump's intention to ensure "that all instances of fraud and illegality are investigated and prosecuted".

On November 17, 2020, Johnson said: "You know the allegations about these voting machines, some of them being rigged with this software by Dominion, there's a lot of merit to that. And when the president says the election was rigged, that's what he's talking about. The fix was in. [...] a software system that is used all around the country that is suspect because it came from Hugo Chávez's Venezuela". By October 2022, Johnson said that he had never supported claims that there was massive fraud in the 2020 election.

In December 2020, Johnson led an effort in which 126 Republican U.S. representatives signed an amicus brief in support of Texas v. Pennsylvania, a lawsuit filed at the Supreme Court of the United States contesting the results of the 2020 presidential election. The Supreme Court declined to hear the case on the basis that Texas lacked standing under Article Three of the United States Constitution to challenge the results of an election held by another state.

During the January 2021 United States Electoral College vote count, Johnson was one of 120 U.S. representatives who objected to certifying the 2020 presidential election results from both Arizona and Pennsylvania, while another 19 U.S. representatives objected for one of these states. The New York Times called Johnson "the most important architect of the Electoral College objections" because he had argued to reject the results based on the argument of "constitutional infirmity" and persuaded "about three-quarters" of the objectors to use that rationale. Johnson's argument was that certain state officials had violated the Constitution by relaxing restrictions on mail-in voting or early voting due to the COVID-19 pandemic without consulting state legislatures.

On May 19, 2021, Johnson and all seven other Republican House leaders in the 117th Congress voted against establishing a national commission to investigate the January 6 United States Capitol attack. Thirty-five Republican House members and all 217 Democrats present voted to establish the commission.

=== Abortion ===
In 2015, Johnson blamed abortions and the "breakup [of] the nuclear family" for school shootings, saying, "when you tell a generation of people that life has no value, no meaning, that it's expendable, then you do wind up with school shooters." In 2015 and 2016, he led an anti-abortion "Life March" in Shreveport-Bossier City.

Johnson opposed Roe v. Wade. In Congress, he has supported bills outlawing abortion both at fertilization and at 15 weeks' gestation. In a 2017 House Judiciary Committee meeting, Johnson argued that Roe v. Wade made it necessary to cut social programs like Social Security, Medicare, and Medicaid because abortion reduced the labor force and thus damaged the economy.

Johnson has co-sponsored bills attempting to ban abortion nationwide, such as the Pain-Capable Unborn Child Protection Act, the Protecting Pain-Capable Unborn Children From Late-Term Abortions Act, and the Heartbeat Protection Act of 2021. All three bills would impose criminal penalties, including potential prison terms of up to five years, upon doctors who perform abortions.

In January 2023, the House passed a resolution Johnson introduced that condemned "vandalism, violence, and destruction against pro-life facilities, groups, and churches", and added that the House "recognizes the sanctity of life and the important role pro-life facilities, groups, and churches play in supporting pregnant women, infants, and families".

In the wake of the Dobbs v. Jackson Women's Health Organization decision, Johnson said that abortion policy was the purview of the states. In May 2024, he said he would not try to pass a nationwide abortion ban.

=== Climate change and the environment ===
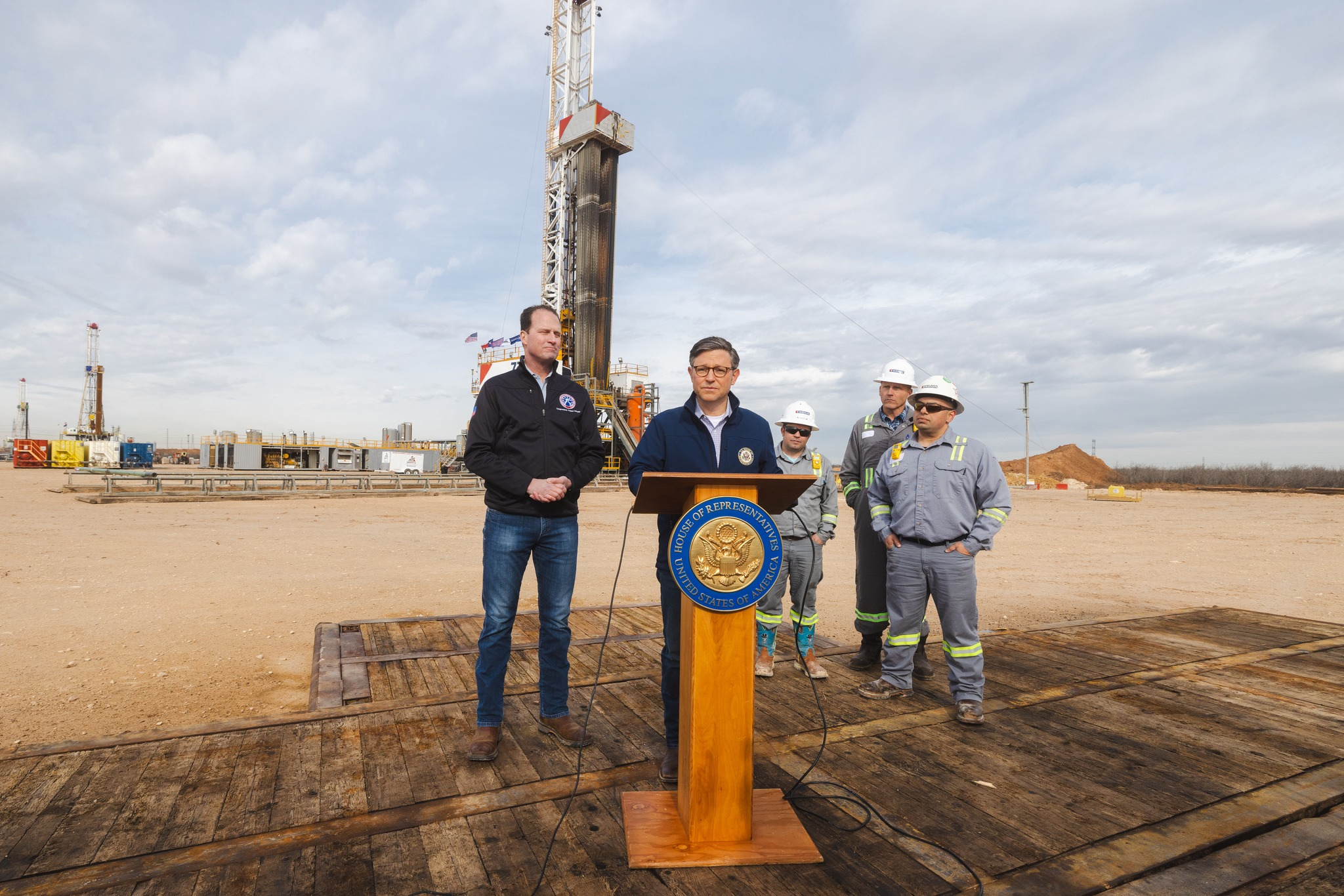
Johnson standing at a Texas oil rig with Representative August Pfluger (left) in March 2024

During a town hall in 2017, Johnson said that he believed that Earth's climate was changing, but questioned the scientific consensus that humans cause climate change.

As of October 2023, Johnson had received $338,125 in donations from the oil and gas industry during his congressional career.

=== Covenant marriage ===
Johnson came to some prominence in the late 1990s when he and his wife appeared on television to promote new laws in Louisiana allowing covenant marriages, under which divorce is much more difficult to obtain than in no-fault divorce. In 2005, Johnson appeared on ABC's Good Morning America to promote covenant marriages, saying, "I'm a big proponent of marriage and fidelity and all the things that go with it".

=== Donald Trump ===
Johnson delivers remarks at a White House reception for Republican members of congress, July 2025

In 2015, Johnson wrote on Facebook that "Donald Trump ... lacks the character and the moral center we desperately need again in the White House", adding: "I am afraid he would break more things than he fixes. He is a hot head by nature, and that is a dangerous trait to have in a Commander in Chief. ... I just don't think he has the demeanor to be President."

In 2019, during Special Counsel Robert Mueller's investigation, Johnson defended Trump, saying that Trump had "cooperated fully" with the investigation and "done nothing wrong".

In 2019, during the first impeachment of Donald Trump, Johnson defended Trump and told White House officials to ignore congressional subpoenas as "legitimate executive privilege in legal immunity". He served as a member of Trump's legal defense team during both the 2019 and 2021 Senate impeachment trials, each of which resulted in acquittal.

Johnson endorsed Trump's 2024 campaign for president, and Trump has endorsed Johnson. Johnson and Trump are considered close allies, having worked closely together since 2017. Trump has called Johnson "a good man who is trying very hard" and "doing a very good job".

Trump endorsed Johnson in the 2025 Speaker of the United States House of Representatives election, and Johnson secured the speakership only after Trump directly spoke with holdout votes. Johnson attended Trump's second inauguration.

=== Economic policy ===
In December 2017, Johnson voted for the Tax Cuts and Jobs Act. After voting for the Act, he called the economy "stunted" and a "burden" on Americans, adding, "The importance of this moment cannot be overstated. With the first comprehensive tax reform in 31 years, we will dramatically strengthen the U.S. economy and restore economic mobility and opportunity for hardworking individuals and families all across this country." In 2018, Johnson said that entitlement reform is his "number one priority", adding that reforms to entitlement programs have to "happen yesterday" to maintain their long-term solvency.

In 2019, Johnson opposed the Raise the Wage Act, which would have raised the federal minimum wage to $15 per hour, calling it "job-crushing legislation". In 2021, Johnson again opposed the bill.

=== Evolution ===
Johnson rejects the scientific consensus on evolution in favor of creationism. He helped the Creation Museum secure millions of dollars in tax subsidies to build a life-sized Ark Encounter, which teaches the discredited claim that dinosaurs accompanied Noah on his Ark and that the earth is 6,000 years old. In 2016, Johnson delivered a sermon that called the teaching of evolution one of the causes of mass shootings: "People say, 'How can a young person go into their schoolhouse and open fire on their classmates?' Because we've taught a whole generation—a couple generations now—of Americans: that there's no right or wrong, that it's about survival of the fittest, and you evolve from the primordial slime. Why is that life of any sacred value? Because there's nobody sacred to whom it's owed."

=== Federal judiciary ===
In March 2025, after several federal judges issued injunctions against the Trump administration's policies, Johnson called this a "dangerous trend", saying it "violates separation of powers when a judge thinks that they can enjoin something that a president is doing". He also said that Congress "can eliminate an entire district court. We have power over funding, over the courts". A month earlier, Johnson had urged judges to "step back" from interfering with DOGE's attempts to improve governmental efficiency.

=== Foreign policy ===
==== China and Taiwan ====
In 2020, Johnson co-wrote a national security report with a section on China trade issues as the leader of the Republican Study Committee. The report called for tougher sanctions on companies and individuals affiliated with the People's Liberation Army as well as the expansion of trade with countries such as Taiwan, Indonesia, and Mongolia to counter China. Before 2023, he introduced two bills about China; one that would ban former members of the United States Congress from lobbying for communist entities and another to forbid foreign governments from funding litigation in U.S. courts.

In July 2024, he promised to pass several bills that propose tough policies on China, saying during a speech to Hudson Institute that "China poses the greatest threat to global peace. Congress must keep our focus on countering China with every tool at our disposal". In December 2024, Johnson spoke with Taiwanese President Lai Ching-te during a stopover in Hawaii.

==== Foreign Intelligence Surveillance ====
In 2024, Johnson opposed a new warrant requirement for the Foreign Intelligence Surveillance Act (FISA). He had previously criticized the program, but said that learning more about it and attending classified briefings had convinced him that FISA reauthorization was vital to national security.

==== Russian invasion of Ukraine ====
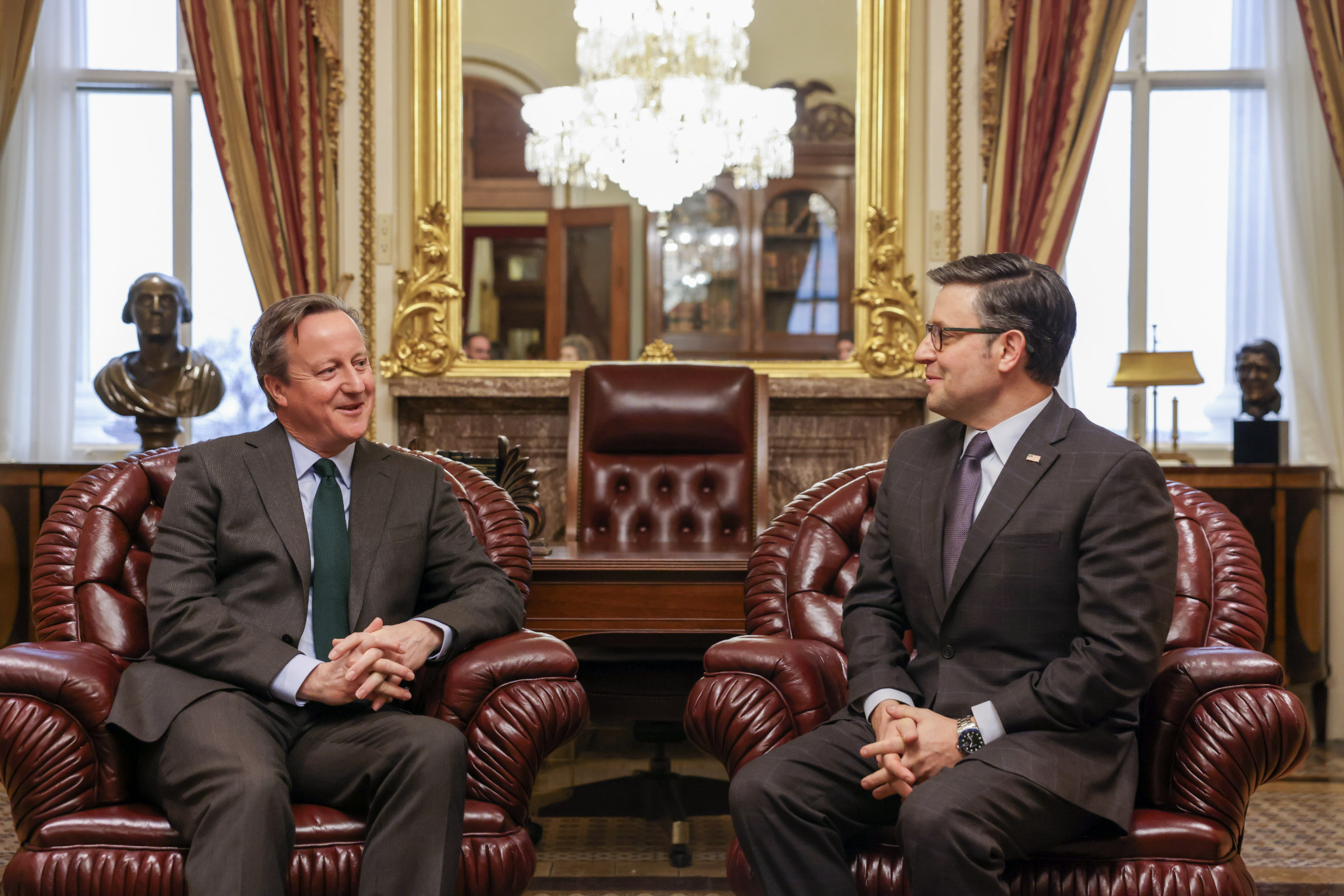
Johnson with British foreign secretary David Cameron in December 2023

In February 2022, Johnson condemned the Russian invasion of Ukraine and called for "sanctions on Russia's economic interests" and Russia's exclusion from "global commerce and international institutions". In April 2022, he voted for the Ukraine Democracy Defense Lend-Lease Act of 2022. Before becoming speaker of the House, Johnson twice voted against assisting Ukraine in its war against Russia by sending military and financial aid. In February 2023, he said, "American taxpayers have sent over $100 billion in aid to Ukraine in the last year. They deserve to know if the Ukrainian government is being entirely forthcoming and transparent about the use of this massive sum of taxpayer resources." After he became speaker, Johnson said he was "open to talks" about Biden's request for additional funds to help the Ukrainian "counter-offensive against Russia". In December 2023, he said that aid for Ukraine would be predicated on new border-security measures. In January 2024, he opposed a bipartisan, Senate Republican-sponsored border security package that included aid for Ukraine and other U.S. allies. The bill failed to pass the Senate.

In April 2024, Johnson put forward a $61 billion aid package for Ukraine that contained no border-related provision, which passed in Congress with bipartisan support and was signed into law by President Biden. Some media and politicians called this a "Churchill or Chamberlain" moment, referring to British prime ministers at the beginning of World War II. Johnson said the classified briefings he had received about events unfolding in Ukraine played a significant role in his decision.

==== Israel–Palestine relations ====
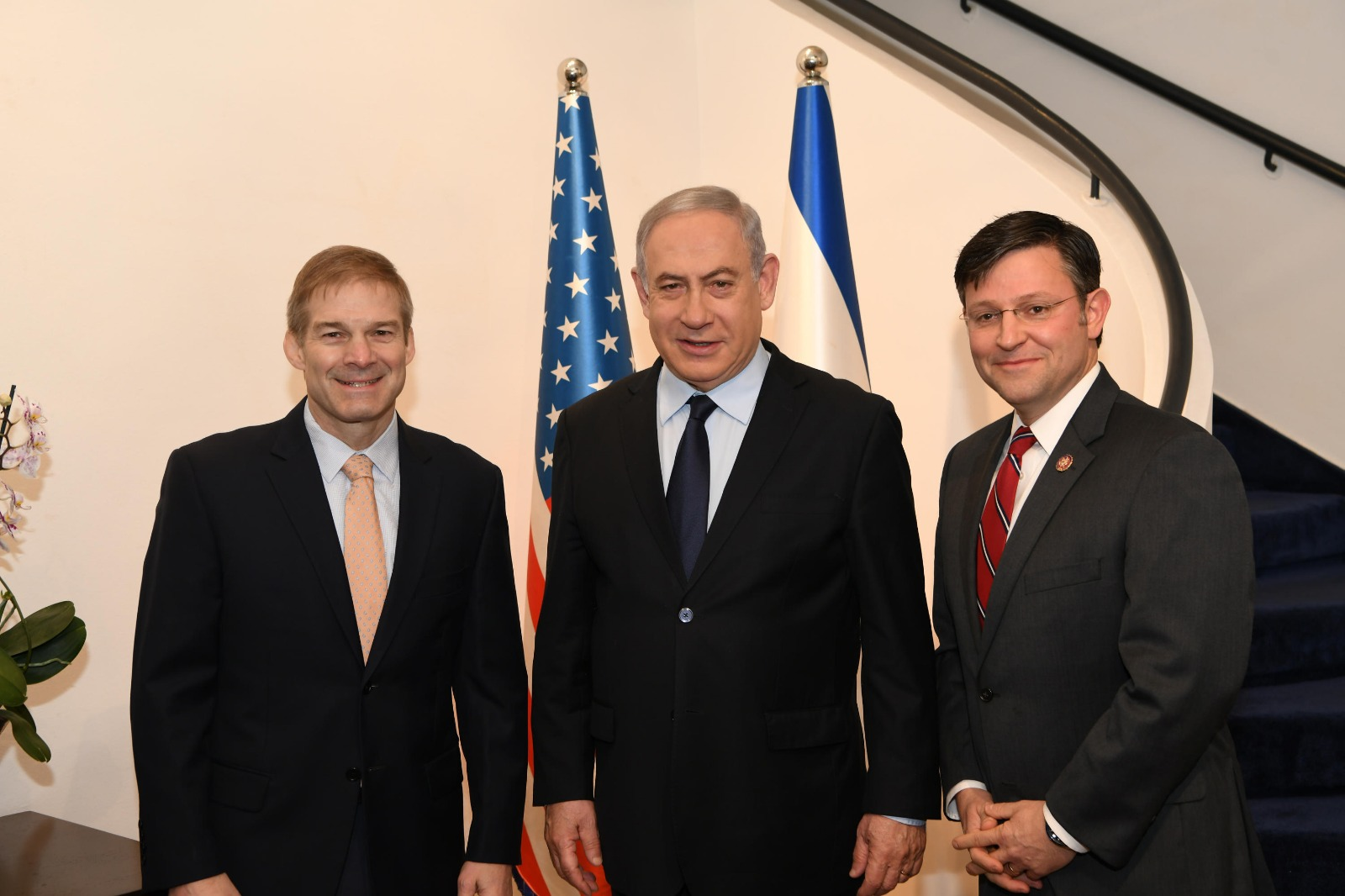
Johnson and Jim Jordan with Israeli prime minister Benjamin Netanyahu in Jerusalem, Israel, February 19, 2020

Johnson visited Israel in February 2020 with 12Tribe Films Foundation. The pro-Israel lobbyist organization AIPAC was Johnson's largest financial donor in 2023.

The first measure the House considered after Johnson became speaker was a resolution expressing support for Israel after the October 7 attacks. Johnson voted for the resolution. On November 2, 2023, the House passed a Johnson-supported bill to give Israel $14.3 billion in aid. On November 14, Johnson said calls for a ceasefire in the Gaza war in the Gaza Strip were "outrageous", adding, "Israel will cease their counter-offensive when Hamas ceases to be a threat to the Jewish state." In April 2024, Johnson criticized pro-Palestinian protests on U.S. university campuses, saying he was determined "that Congress will not be silent as Jewish students are expected to run for their lives and stay home from their classes hiding in fear."

During an August 2025 visit to the Israeli settlement of Ariel in the West Bank, Johnson said the "mountains of Judea and Samaria" belong to the Jewish people "by right".

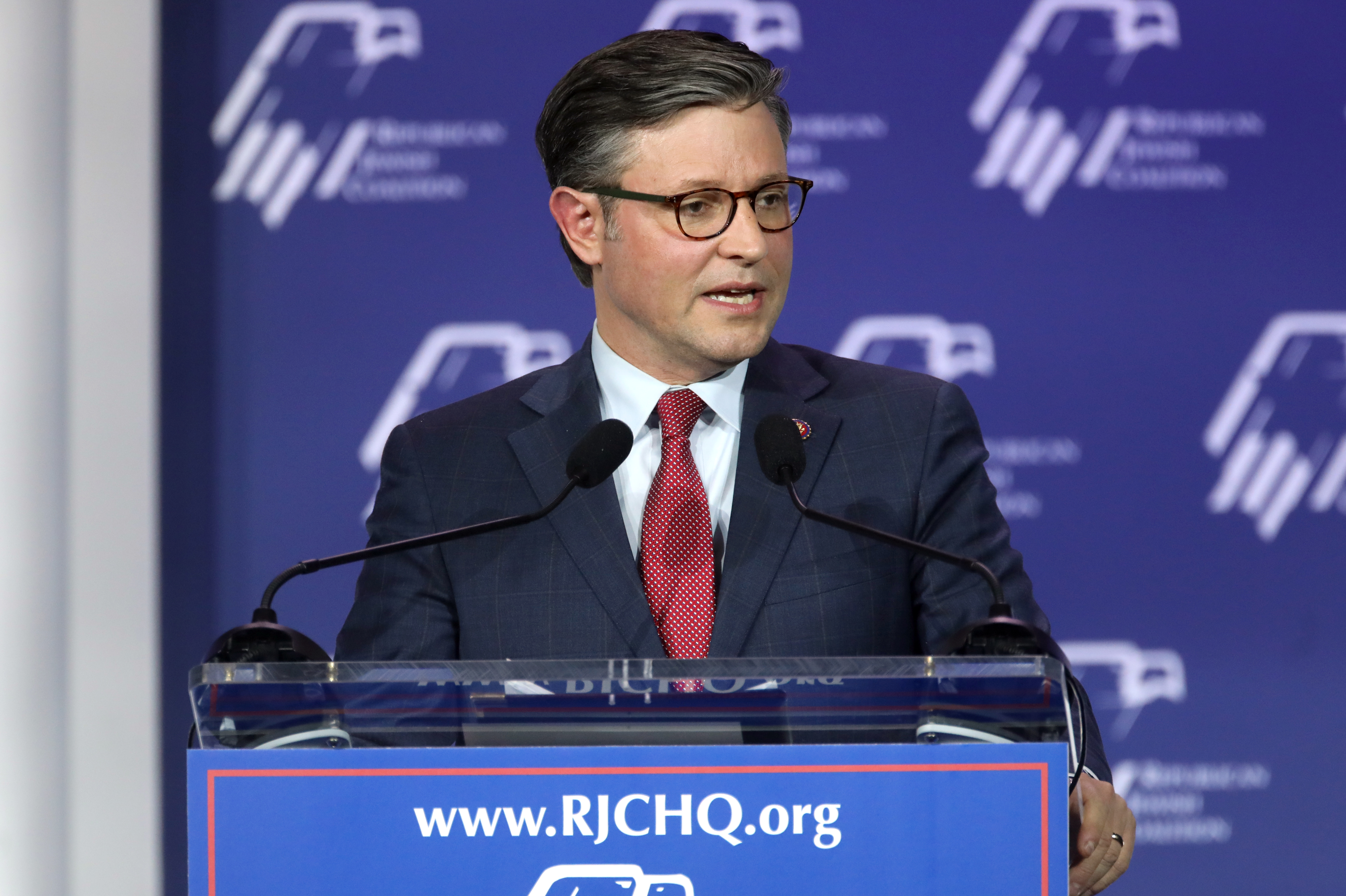
Johnson speaking at the Republican Jewish Coalition's Annual Leadership Summit, October 28, 2023

==== Iran ====
Johnson supported President Trump's strikes on Iran in June 2025, and opposed "a bipartisan war powers resolution to prevent U.S. intervention in Iran".

In March 2026, Johnson voiced support for joint Israeli-U.S. strikes against Iran. He argued that Israel was prepared to act independently and that failing to participate in the actions could have "devastating" consequences. He called U.S. involvement a "defensive measure" and "absolutely necessary for our defense", in the context of managing the fallout of an imminent Israeli strike.

=== Health care ===
Johnson voted for the American Health Care Act of 2017, which would have repealed the Affordable Care Act (ACA).

In 2019, as chair of the Republican Study Committee, Johnson spearheaded an effort to replace the ACA. The committee's plan would have rescinded the ACA's Medicaid expansion.

=== Immigration ===
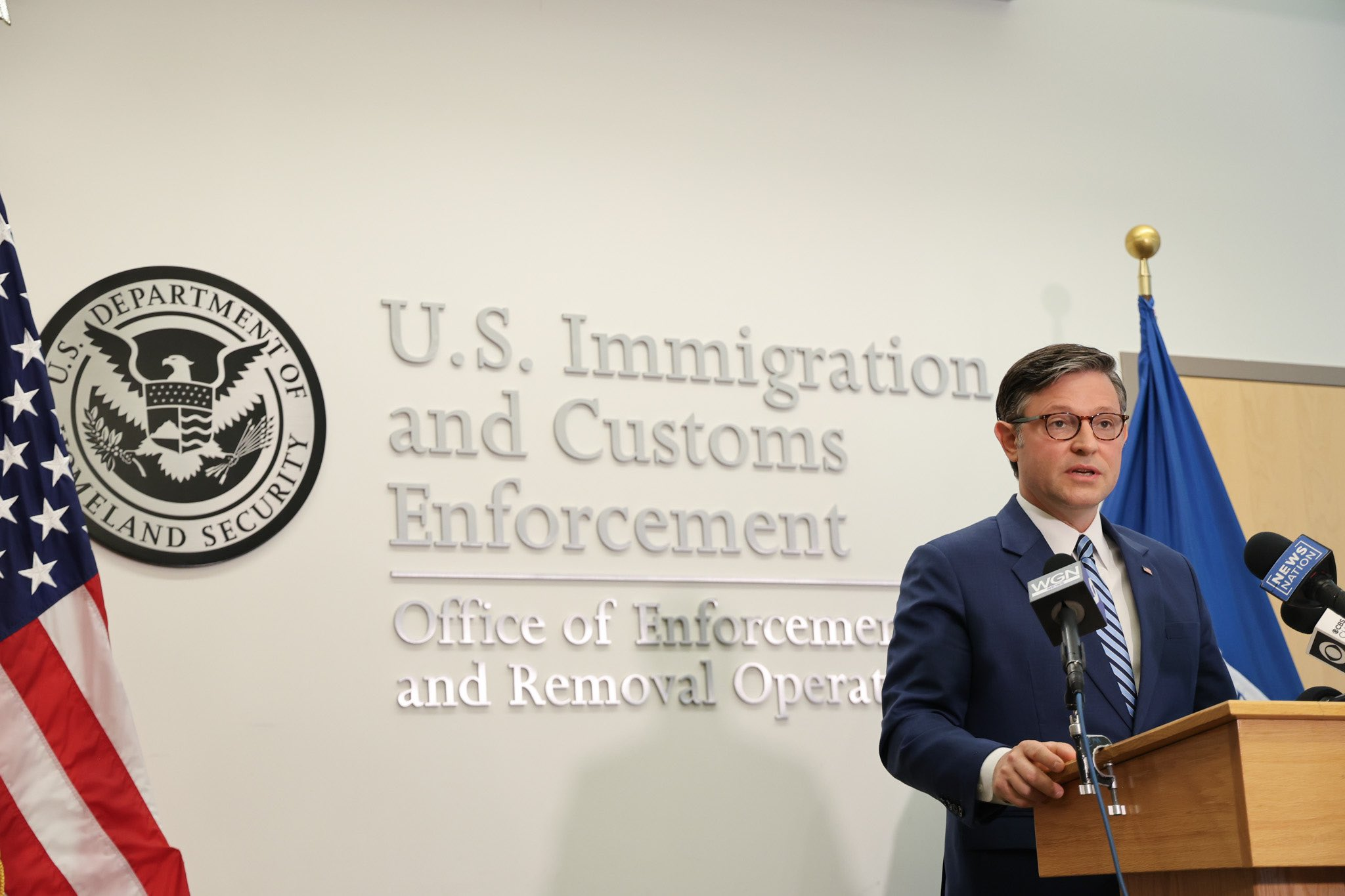
Johnson speaking at United States Immigration and Customs Enforcement headquarters, colloquially known as ICE, in June 2025

Johnson supported Trump's 2017 executive order to prohibit immigration from seven predominantly Muslim countries, saying: "This is not an effort to ban any religion, but rather an effort to adequately protect our homeland. We live in a dangerous world, and this important measure will help us balance freedom and security."

As of 2023, Johnson had "introduced legislation three times aimed at tightening the asylum system, including by raising the bar on undocumented immigrants to establish their claim of fear of persecution".

In January 2024, Johnson opposed a bipartisan, Senate Republican-backed border security and immigration bill that would also provide funding for Ukraine, Israel, and Taiwan. That bill failed to pass the Senate. During border negotiations, Johnson said he discussed immigration policy frequently with Trump.

=== In-vitro fertilization and embryonic stem-cell research ===
In 2023, Johnson co-sponsored legislation declaring that human life and personhood begin at conception with no exception for in-vitro fertilization treatments involving embryos or embryonic stem-cell research. In 2024, after public backlash to an Alabama Supreme Court decision ruling that embryos are children under Alabama state law, meaning fertility clinics were liable for the loss of embryos as if they were children, Johnson announced that he supports access to in-vitro fertilization. But on March 7, 2024, he clarified that he does not support federal legislation to protect legal access to IVF, saying he believes it is a state issue. Johnson has said IVF "is a remarkable thing and something we ought to preserve and protect".

=== LGBTQ rights ===
In 2023, Andrew Kaczynski of CNN wrote that Johnson "has a history of harsh anti-gay language from his time as an attorney for a socially conservative legal group in the mid-2000s". Kaczynski pointed to editorials Johnson wrote in the early 2000s in his local paper, The Shreveport Times, calling homosexuality "inherently unnatural" and a "dangerous lifestyle". When asked about the editorials, Johnson said, "I don't even remember some of them...I was a litigator that was called upon to defend the state marriage amendments." Johnson described himself as a Bible-believing Christian who genuinely loves all people and respects the rule of law.

In a 2003 article, Johnson wrote: "Homosexuals do not meet the criteria for a suspect class under the equal protection clause because they are neither disadvantaged nor identified on the basis of immutable characteristics, as all are capable of changing their abnormal lifestyles." He wrote that legalizing same-sex marriage could put the country's "entire democratic system in jeopardy". In another article, he wrote, "experts project that homosexual marriage is the dark harbinger of chaos and sexual anarchy that could doom even the strongest republic".

Johnson opposed the 2003 U.S. Supreme Court decision Lawrence v. Texas, which held that most criminal punishment of private sexual conduct between consenting adults is unconstitutional. Johnson's employer at the time, the Alliance Defending Freedom (ADF), submitted an amicus brief that supported maintaining criminalization. In a 2003 editorial, Johnson wrote, "States have many legitimate grounds to proscribe same-sex deviate sexual intercourse." In a 2008 radio interview, Johnson suggested that homosexuality contributed to the downfall of the Roman Empire.

Johnson provided legal services for Exodus International, an organization allied with the ADF that promotes gay conversion therapy. He worked with Exodus International to promote the Day of Truth, a counterprotest to the pro-LGBTQ Day of Silence that spread material disparaging homosexuality. In 2005, Johnson campaigned against GLSEN's annual anti-bullying Day of Silence, telling NBC News: "that's cloaking their real message—that homosexuality is good for society".

Johnson opposed Obergefell v. Hodges, the Supreme Court ruling that legalized same-sex marriage nationally. In an interview shortly after he was elected speaker, Johnson said, "I am a rule-of-law guy. I made a career defending the rule of law. I respect the rule of law. When the Supreme Court issued the Obergefell opinion, that became the law of the land, OK."

In 2022, Johnson introduced the Stop the Sexualization of Children Act, which would prohibit federally funded institutions, including public schools and libraries, from mentioning sexual orientation or gender identity. The bill has been compared to the Florida Parental Rights in Education Act, commonly referred to as the "Don't Say Gay" law.

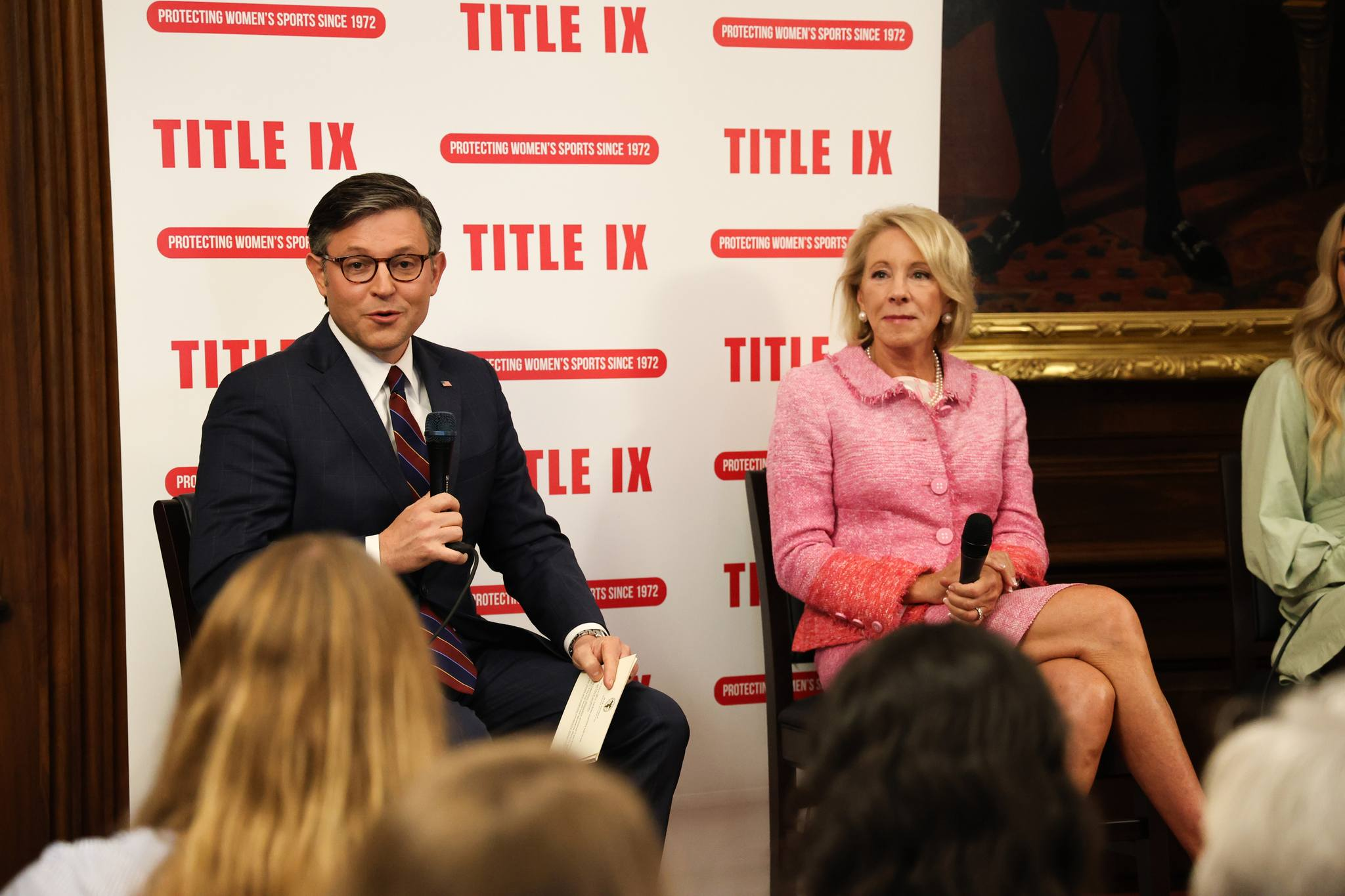
Johnson and Betsy DeVos discussing Title IX in relation to women's sports

At a July 2023 hearing on transgender youth, Johnson spoke against allowing children to receive gender-affirming care, saying: "Our American legal system recognizes the important public interest in protecting children from abuse and physical harm". He has co-sponsored legislation that would make it a felony to provide opposite-sex hormones or gender-affirming surgeries to minors.

In November 2024, Johnson announced a new policy on bathrooms in the U.S. Capitol, saying: "All single-sex facilities in the Capitol and House Office Buildings—such as restrooms, changing rooms, and locker rooms—are reserved for individuals of that biological sex. It is important to note that each Member office has its own private restroom, and unisex restrooms are available throughout the Capitol." The new policy was enacted less than a month after the election of Sarah McBride, the first openly transgender person elected to Congress.

=== Cannabis ===
In 2016, Johnson opposed the expansion of medical cannabis in Louisiana, arguing that cannabis can worsen some conditions, specifically epilepsy, quoting the American Epilepsy Society's studies that it can cause "severe dystonic reactions and other movement disorders, developmental regression, intractable vomiting, and worsening seizures" in children with epilepsy.

As of 2023, Johnson had twice voted against the decriminalization of cannabis.

=== Religion ===
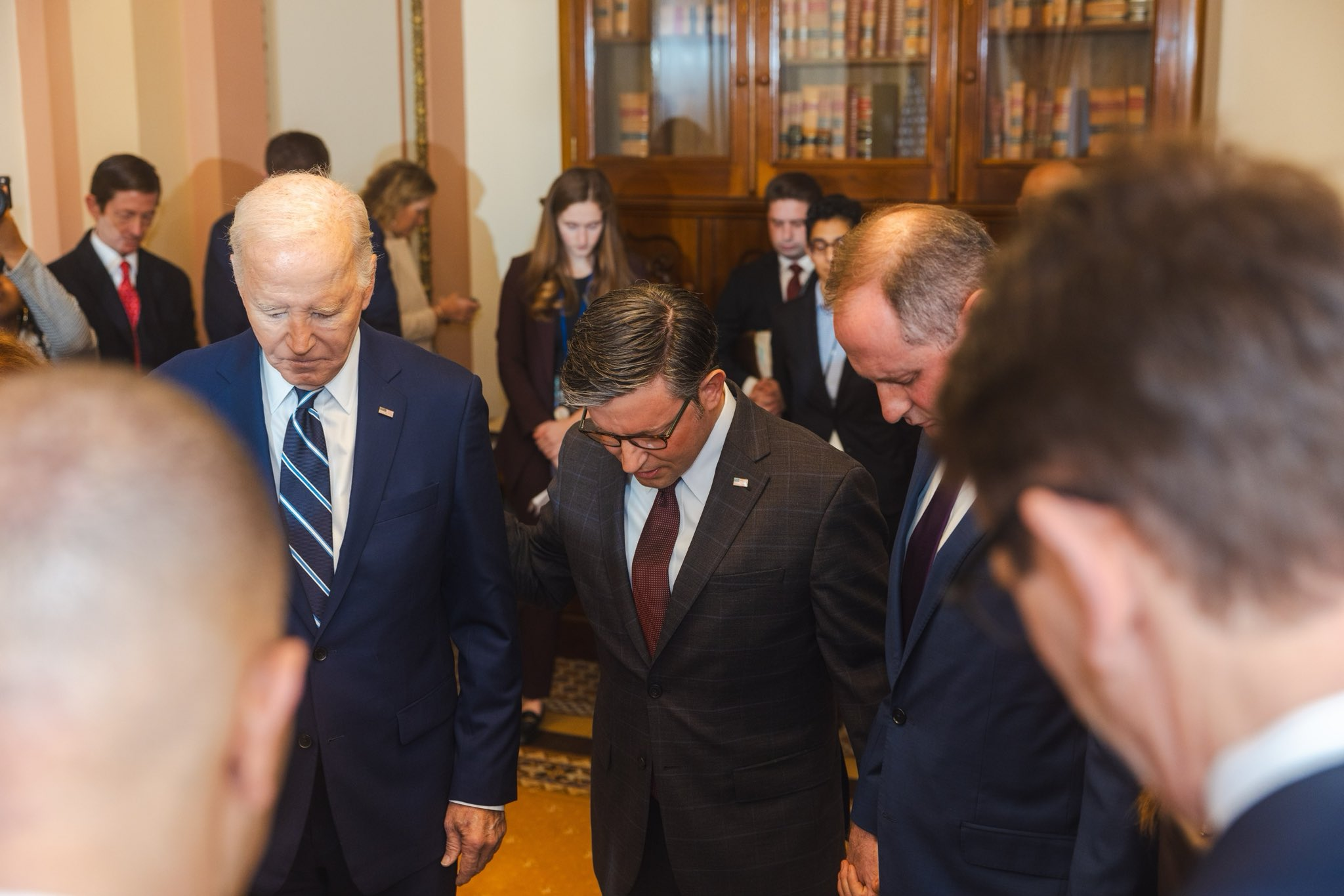
Johnson with President Joe Biden at the National Prayer Breakfast in February 2024

Johnson is a member of the Christian right faction of the Republican Party. His inaugural speech as speaker of the House emphasized his Southern Baptist beliefs as the basis for his politics.

Johnson has referred to the "so-called separation of church and state". He has asserted that "the founders wanted to protect the church from an encroaching state, not the other way around."

In April 2018, Johnson joined Attorney General of Louisiana Jeff Landry, a Republican, and Christian actor Kirk Cameron to argue under the First Amendment to the United States Constitution for student-led school prayer and religious expression in public schools.

Johnson has cited David Barton, an evangelical author and political activist, as influential to him.

After Representative Andy Ogles posted, "Muslims don't belong in American society", Johnson declined to condemn Ogles. In response to a question about Ogles's post, Johnson said: "There's a lot of energy in the country and a lot of popular sentiment that the demand to impose Sharia law in America is a serious problem. That's what animates this. The language that people use—it's different language than I would use. But I think that's a serious issue. Sharia law and the imposition of Sharia law is contrary to the U.S. Constitution. When you seek to come to a country and not assimilate but impose Sharia law, Sharia law is in conflict with the Constitution. It's not about people as Muslims; it's about those who seek to impose a different belief system that is in direct conflict with the Constitution."

== Personal life ==
Johnson with his family in 2024

Johnson married Kelly Renee Lary on May 1, 1999. Their primary residence is in Benton, Louisiana.

The Johnsons have five children, including an adopted son, Michael Tirrell James. Johnson and his wife met James, who is black, at an event for Young Life Ministries. The Johnsons took James in, assuming legal guardianship of him when he was 14 years old. James, who maintains a private life with his family, has said: "If the Johnsons hadn't taken me in as a teenager, my life would look very different today. I would probably be in prison or I might not have made it at all."

Johnson and his wife have co-hosted the podcast Truth Be Told since March 2022, discussing public affairs and other issues from a Christian perspective. On his podcast, Johnson said that "the Word of God is, of course, the ultimate source of all truth", and attributed the success of the United States to its foundation upon a "religious statement of faith".

Johnson describes himself as a Christian first and foremost. An evangelical and a Southern Baptist, he has said: "My faith informs everything I do."

== See also ==
- Electoral history of Mike Johnson

== Notes ==
U.S. House of Representatives
Preceded by John Fleming	Member of the U.S. House of Representatives for Louisiana's 4th congressional district 2017–present	Incumbent
Party political offices
Preceded by Mark Walker	Chair of the Republican Study Committee; 2019–2021	Succeeded by Jim Banks
Preceded by Mark Walker	Vice Chair of the House Republican Conference; 2021–2023	Succeeded by Blake Moore
Preceded by Kevin McCarthy	House Republican Leader; 2023–present	Incumbent
Political offices
Preceded by Patrick McHenry as Speaker pro tempore	Speaker of the United States House of Representatives; 2023–present	Incumbent
U.S. order of precedence (ceremonial)
Preceded by Relevant state governor	Order of precedence of the United States as Speaker of the U.S. House of Representatives	Succeeded by John Roberts as Chief Justice
Preceded by Pramila Jayapal	United States representatives by seniority 169th	Succeeded by Ro Khanna
U.S. presidential line of succession
Preceded by JD Vance as Vice President	Second in line as Speaker of the U.S. House of Representatives	Succeeded by Chuck Grassley as President pro tempore of the United States Senate
