= Raymond Crews =

American politician

Raymond J. Crews

Member of the Louisiana House of Representatives from the 8th district
- Incumbent
- Assumed office April 2017
- Preceded by: Mike Johnson

Personal details
- Born: Shreveport, Louisiana, U.S.
- Party: Republican
- Education: Texas A&M University
- Occupation: Air Force pilot

Raymond J. Crews is a retired Air Force pilot and small business owner. Since 2017, he is a member of the Louisiana House of Representatives. He is the Vice Chairman of the Louisiana Freedom Caucus.

== Early life, education and career ==
Raymond J. Crews was born in south Shreveport. His family moved to the Northeast, and he went to high school there.

Crews holds a bachelor's degree in computer science from Texas A&M University.

Crews spent an overall 17 years in the U.S. Air Force, 9 of which in active duty, which included combat operations in Iraq. During 8 years in the Air Force Reserve, where he was a pilot for B-52 bombers, he took part in combat operations in Iraq and Afghanistan.

After leaving active duty, Crews became an Airline pilot and flew B-727, DC-9, and A-320 civilian aircraft for 17 years. Today, he operates small businesses, including an Aerial Mapping Service named "Infrared Services LLC" and a small business consulting on building energy performance named "The Green Home Advantage LLC". He holds 33% percent of the stakes of each company. In 2016, Crews has been a full-time employee Delta Air Lines as a pilot and worked for Diabetes Assessment & Management Centers part-time.

== Political positions ==
Crews is a Christian conservative, with respect to both social and fiscal aspects. He believes in the right to life starting at conception and believes that the United States were founded on the basis of Judeo-Christian principles, of which the Constitutions rights are a result. He supports the view that being an American presupposes the recognition of those rights, the acknowledgement of the inherent dignity and the freedom of religion of each individual. Crews defends the right to bear arms and stands for a strong national security, through the support of U.S. troops, a well-financed military and an improved cyber security infrastructure. Part of his fight for personal freedom is the conviction that a small government with limited tax burdens for the citizens is the best way of promoting a good business climate with quality jobs for his constituency, and also the U.S. as a whole.

== Member of the House of Representatives of Louisiana ==
=== Elections ===
On April 29, 2017, Crews defeated his competitor Robbie Gatti, the brother of State Senator Ryan Gatti, a Baptist minister and retired physical therapist by a vote of 64 to 36 percent.

Crews was sworn in May 10, 2017, to represent District 8 in Louisiana's House of Representatives at Baton Rouge, replacing Republican Mike Johnson after Johnson was elected to the U.S. House of Representatives in December 2016. He was sworn in by former House District 8 legislator and current Louisiana 26th Judicial Court Judge Jeff R. Thompson. During the event, Crews said that he wanted to be among the "defenders of liberty in the political realm", realizing the great potential of the people and natural resources of Louisiana.

=== Support ===
On February 6, 2017, NORTHPAC, a Political Action Committee (PAC) of the Louisiana Association of Business and Industry (LABI) published their endorsement of Crews in his campaign for Louisiana House District 8. NORTHPAC supports candidates who stand for Free market principles.

On April 5, 2017, Louisiana Attorney General Jeff Landry endorsed Crews, who said that this was not only "extremely encouraging", but also "validates the principles and priorities of the campaign". Only a few days earlier, Crews had also been endorsed by Former Louisiana House of Representatives District 8 candidate Patrick Harrington and Congressman Mike Johnson.

=== Committees ===
Representative Crews is a member of the following Legislative Committees:

- Administration of Criminal Justice
- Civil Law and Procedure
- Labor and Industrial Relations
- Military and Veterans Affairs

=== Electoral history ===
In a vote on May 17, 2017, the House Committee on the Administration of Criminal Justice blocked a vote to end capital punishment in the state of Louisiana by a 9–8 vote. Raymond J. Crews was amongst those who voted against abolition. Two days later, he voted against a successful 7–6 decision to prohibit anyone in Louisiana to hand over fully automatic weapons to children 12 or younger.

== Personal life ==
Crews is married to his wife Dianah, a chemist and science teacher at Providence Classical Academy. The couple has two children. Crews and his wife have been residents and homeowners in Bossier parish for 20 years. Crews is a past Chairman of Deacons and Sunday School Teacher at First Bossier Baptist Church. He is an advisory board member at DiAMC (Diabetes Assessment & Management Centers). Ute Ingrid Neumann Crews, his mother, died in a car accident on April 27, 2018, at the age of 76.
