= Charlton Historic District =

Historic district in New York, United States

- U.S. National Register of Historic Places
- U.S. Historic district

- Location within New York Location within the United States
- Location: Main St. (SR 51), Charlton, New York
- Coordinates: 42°56′2″N 73°57′55″W
- Area: 123 acres (50 ha)
- Built: 1787
- Architect: Dows, Eleazer; et al.
- Architectural style: Greek Revival, Italianate
- NRHP reference No.: 76001271
- Added to NRHP: January 1, 1976

Charlton Historic District is a 123-acre (50 ha) national historic district located at the hamlet of Charlton, town of Charlton in Saratoga County, New York. The listing included 37 contributing buildings and one other contributing structure. The district dates to 1787 and includes notable Greek Revival and Italianate architecture.

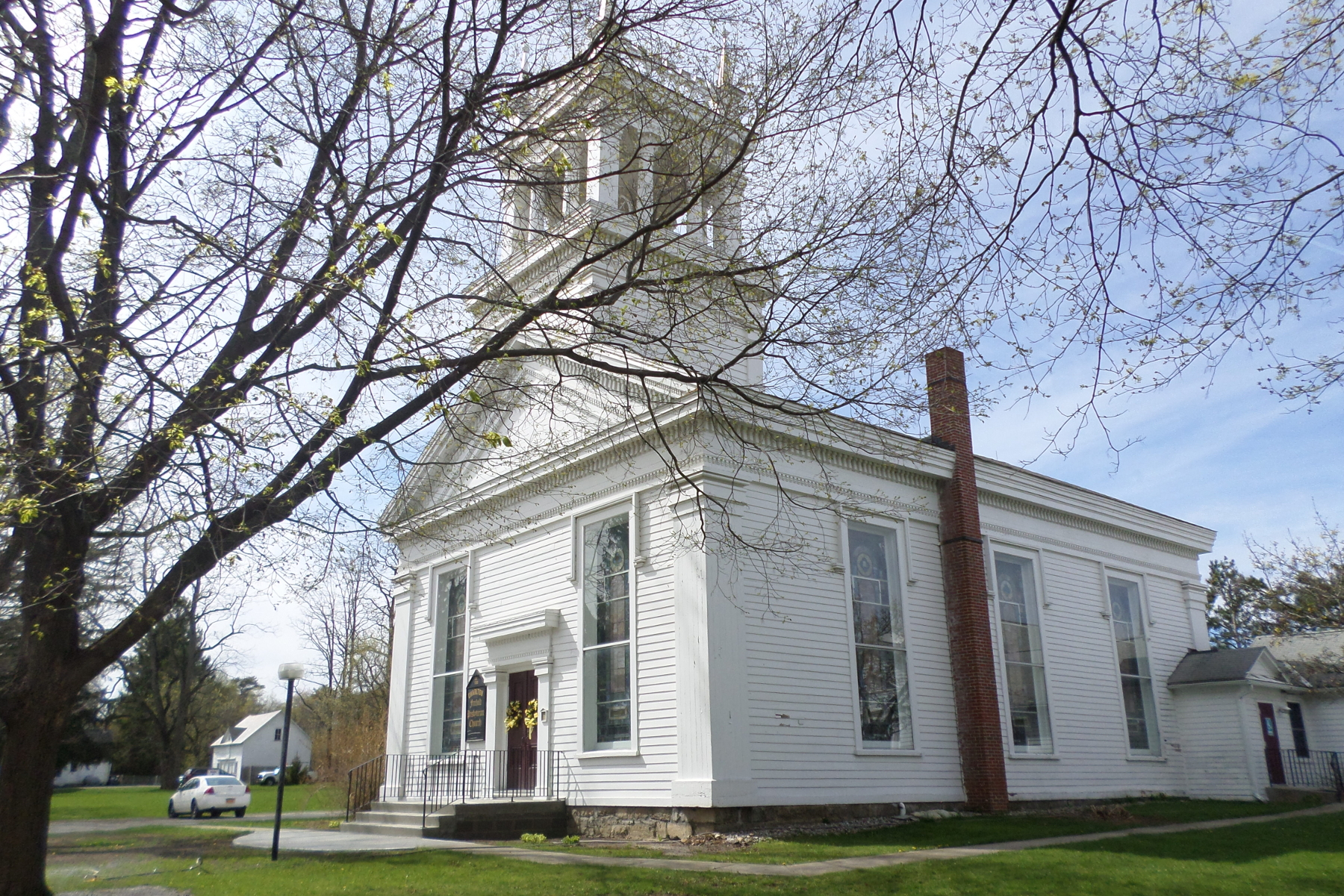
Freehold Presbyterian Church in 2016

The district is chiefly residential, but also includes the stucco covered old schoolhouse (1859), Charlton Village Shop (ca. 1829), fire hall, historical society headquarters, garage, church, and The Charlton House tavern (ca. 1791). Almost all the buildings are sided with wood painted white or with a modern shingle replacement. The buildings range from one to two stories. Six are believed to have been built prior to 1800, fifteen from 1800 to 1830, thirteen from 1830 to 1880, and fifteen after 1880. The largest and most prominent building in the district is the Greek Revival style Freehold Presbyterian Church, dated to 1852.

It was listed on the National Register of Historic Places in 1976.

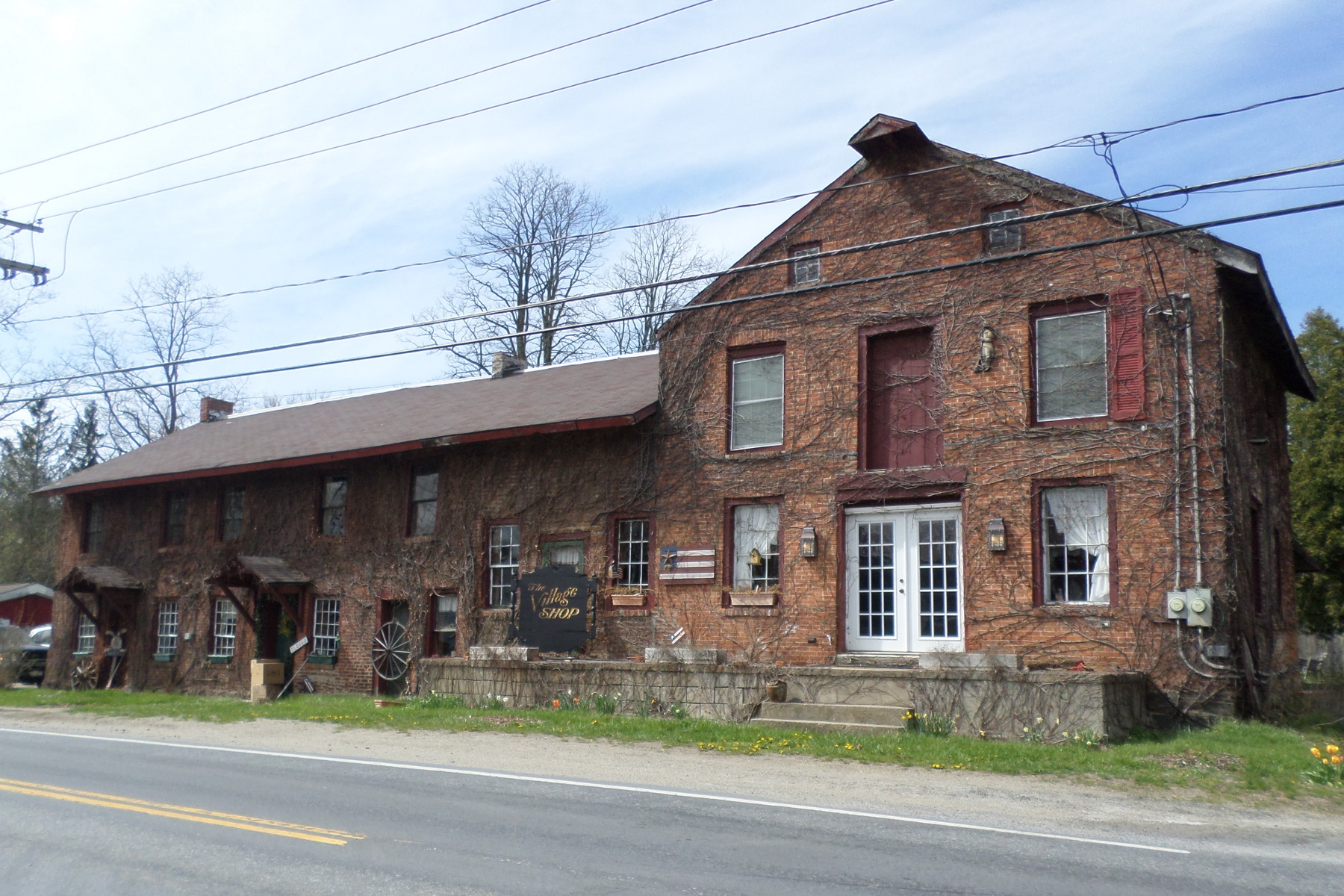
Charlton Village Shop in 2016

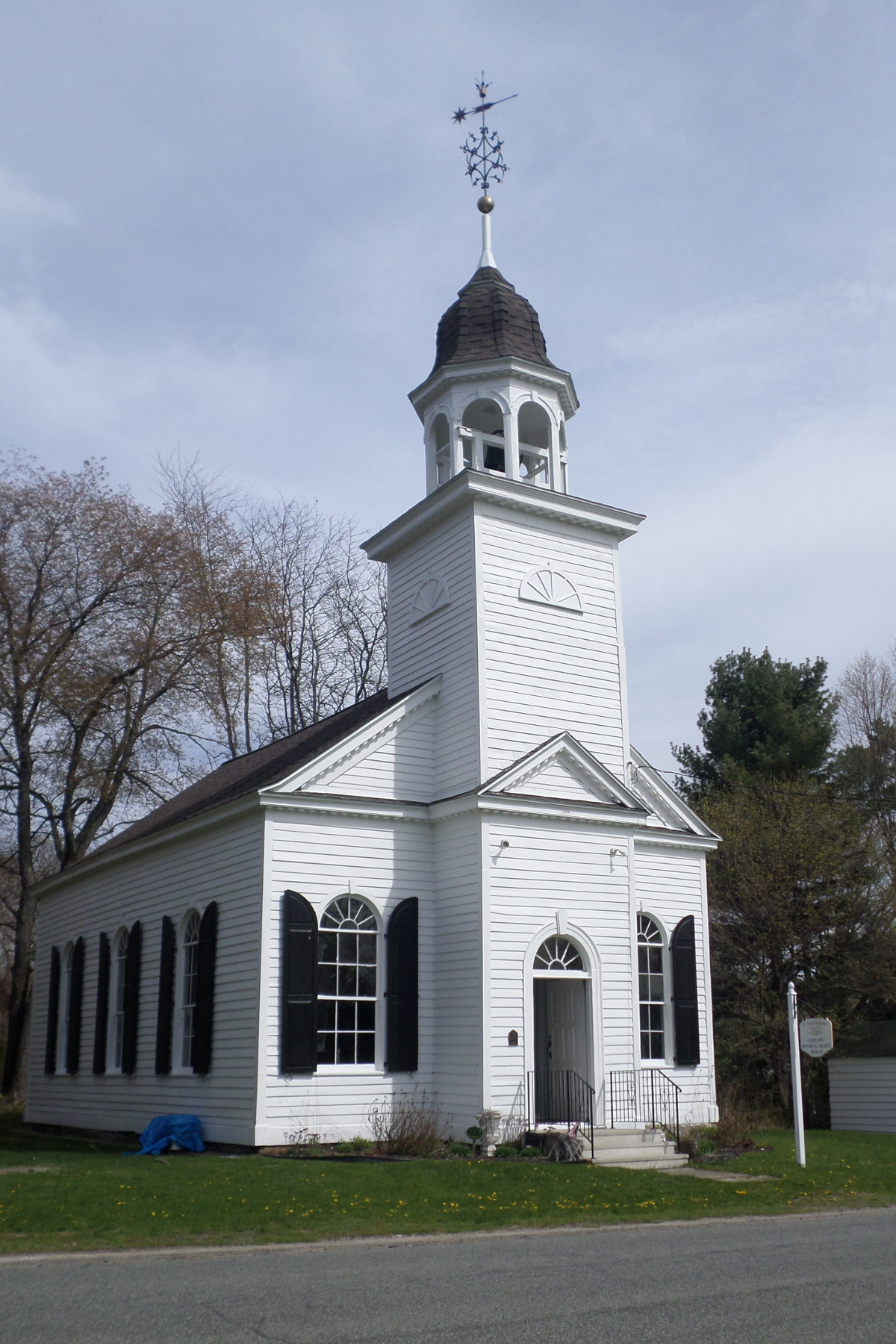
Former St. Paul's Episcopal Church in 2016
