= A. B. Earle =

American pastor

Absalom Backus Earle
- Preacher, evangelist and author
- Born: 1812; Charlton, New York, USA
- Died: March 30, 1895; Newton, Massachusetts, USA

Absalom Backus Earle (1812–1895), also known as A. B. Earle, was an American Baptist pastor, evangelist and author, well-known for his public meetings in US and Canada. He was born in Charlton, New York in 1812 and later moved to Amsterdam, New York where he pastored a church for five years.

== Life and Ministry ==
Earle was converted in 1828 at the age of 16. In 1830, two years after his conversion, he started preaching and studying the Bible. When he was 21 years old, A. B. Earle was ordained at Amsterdam, New York, where he preached for five years. Following his pastoral work, he became an evangelist for 58 years, visiting every state in the US, three provinces in Canada and the British Isles. He crossed 325,000 miles, preached 19,780 times, and 150,000 persons professed conversions in his meetings in the United States and Canada. He died at his home in Newton, Massachusetts, on March 30, 1895, at 83 years of age.

== Works ==
- Abiding Peace
- Bringing in the Sheaves
- Evidences of Conversion
- Incidents used by Rev. A. B. Earle in his meetings|
- Rest of Faith
- Revival Hymns
- The Human Will
- Two Sermons
- Winning Souls
- Work of an Evangelist: Review of Fifty Years
