= John W. Taylor (politician) =

American politician (1784–1854)

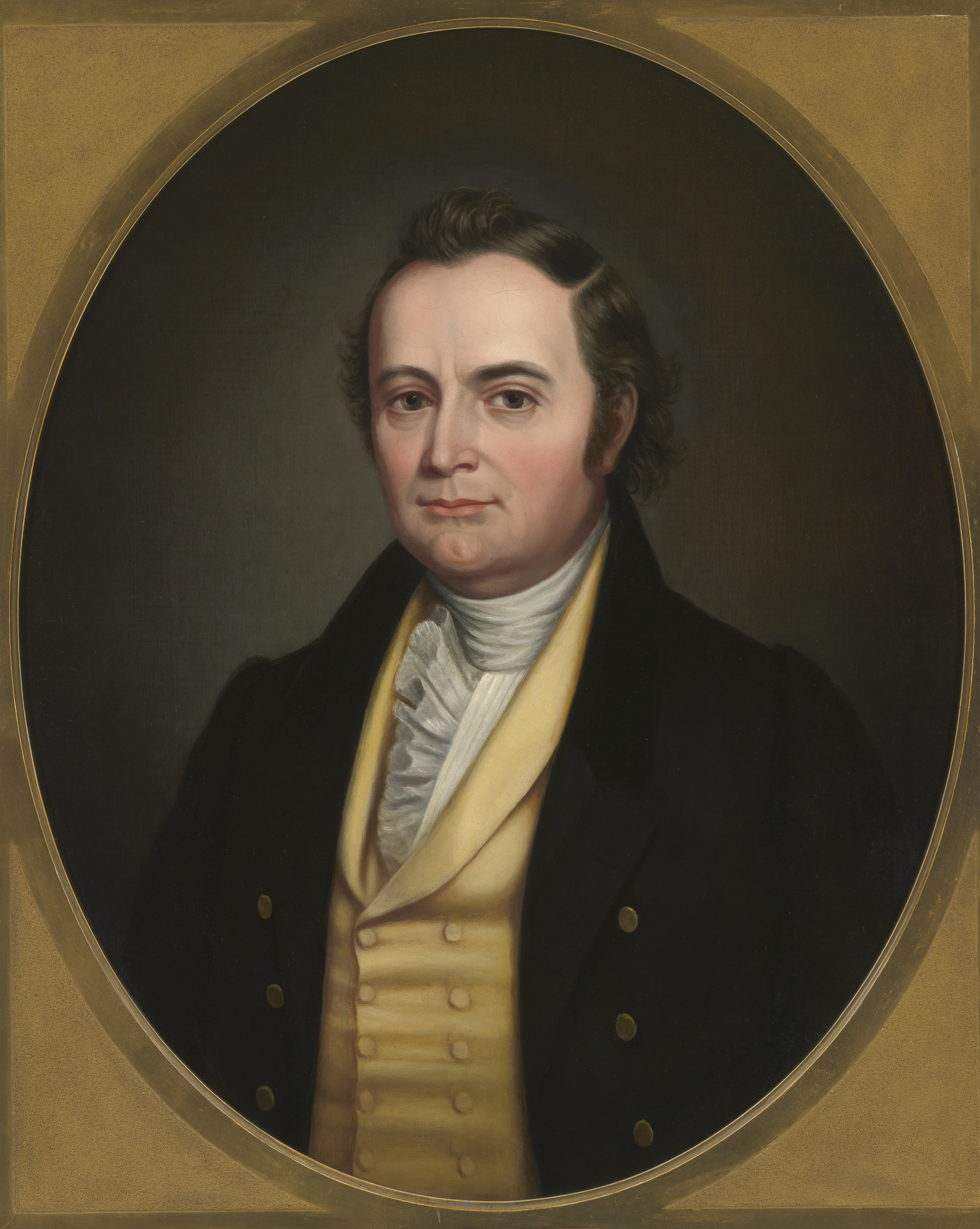
- Posthumous portrait by Caroline L. Ormes Ransom, c. 1900

9th Speaker of the United States House of Representatives
- In office December 5, 1825 – March 4, 1827
- Preceded by: Henry Clay
- Succeeded by: Andrew Stevenson
- In office November 15, 1820 (Note: multi-ballot election; voting lasted two days (The vacancy was caused by Henry Clay's resignation in October)) – March 4, 1821
- Preceded by: Henry Clay
- Succeeded by: Philip P. Barbour

Member of the U.S. House of Representatives from New York
- In office March 4, 1813 – March 3, 1833
- Preceded by: Thomas R. Gold
- Succeeded by: Joel Turrill
- Constituency: 11th district (1813–1823); 17th district (1823–1833)

Member of the New York Senate from the 5th district
- In office January 1, 1841 – December 31, 1842
- Preceded by: Samuel Young
- Succeeded by: Sidney Lawrence

Personal details
- Born: March 26, 1784 Charlton, New York
- Died: September 18, 1854 (aged 70) Cleveland, Ohio
- Party: Democratic-Republican (before 1825); National Republican (after 1825)
- Spouse: Jane Hodge Taylor
- Education: Union College
- Profession: Law

John W. Taylor (March 26, 1784 – September 18, 1854) was an early 19th-century U.S. politician from New York. He served twice as speaker of the House of Representatives.

== Life ==
Taylor was born in 1784 in that part of the Town of Ballston, then in Albany County, New York, which was, upon the creation of Saratoga County in 1791, split off to form the Town of Charlton. He received his first education at home.

Taylor graduated from Union College in 1803 as valedictorian of his class. Then he studied law, was admitted to the bar in 1807, and practiced in Ballston Spa, New York. In 1806, he married Jane Hodge (died 1838), of Albany, New York, and they had eight children. He was a member from Saratoga County of the New York State Assembly in 1812 and 1812–13.

Taylor served in the United States House of Representatives for 20 years, from 1813 to 1833, and was twice elected as Speaker of the House: in 1820 and in 1825. In 1819, he supported the proposed Tallmadge Amendment regarding the Missouri Territory's admission to the Union as a free state (which passed the House, but was defeated in the Senate), and was a staunch proponent of the subsequent Missouri Compromise of March 1820. During the floor debate on the Tallmadge Amendment, Taylor boldly criticized southern lawmakers who frequently voiced their dismay that slavery was entrenched and necessary to their existence.

After leaving Congress, Taylor resumed his law practice in Ballston Spa, and was a member of the New York State Senate (4th D.) in 1841 and 1842. He resigned his seat on August 19, 1842, after suffering a paralytic stroke. In 1843, he moved to Cleveland, Ohio, to live with his eldest daughter and her husband William D. Beattie, and died there 11 years later. He was buried in the Ballston Spa Village Cemetery.

== Note(s) ==
U.S. House of Representatives
Preceded by Thomas R. Gold	Member of the U.S. House of Representatives from New York's 11th congressional district 1813–1823	Succeeded by Charles A. Foote
Preceded by Henry Clay	Speaker of the U.S. House of Representatives; 1820–1821	Succeeded by Philip P. Barbour
Preceded by Thomas H. Hubbard	Member of the U.S. House of Representatives from New York's 17th congressional district 1823–1833	Succeeded by Samuel Beardsley, Joel Turrill
Preceded by Henry Clay	Speaker of the U.S. House of Representatives; 1825–1827	Succeeded by Andrew Stevenson
New York State Senate
Preceded by Samuel Young	New York State Senate; Fourth District (Class 2); 1841–1842	Succeeded by Sidney Lawrence
