= Charlton, New York =

Charlton
- Town
- Town of Charlton
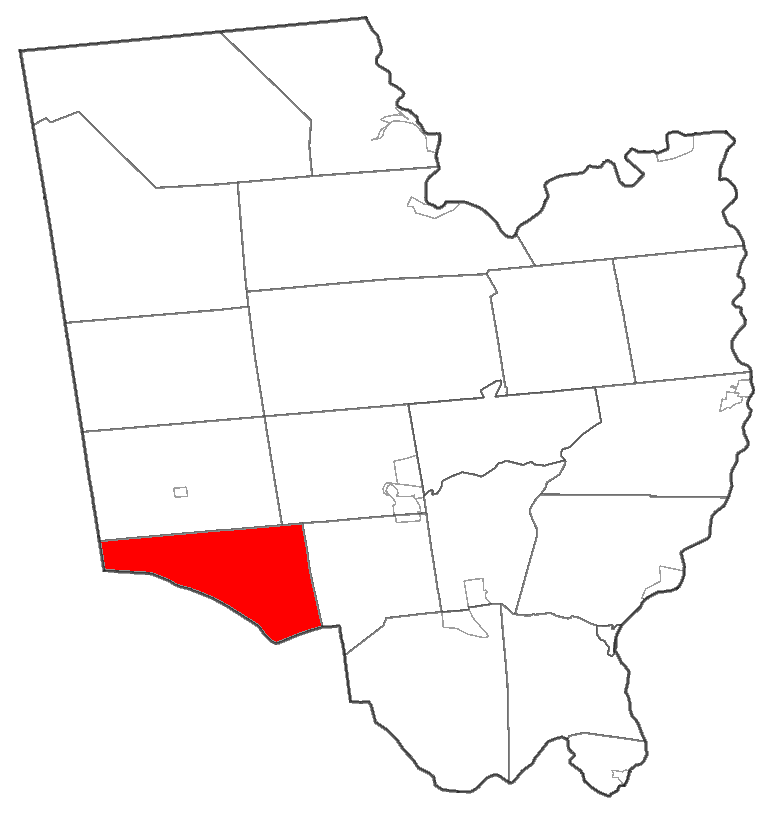
- Map highlighting Charlton's location within Saratoga County.

- Location within the state of New York
- Coordinates: 42°57′1″N 73°59′27″W
- Country: United States
- State: New York
- County: Saratoga
- Named for: Charlton, Worcestershire

Area
  - Total: 32.96 sq mi (85.37 km^{2})
  - Land: 32.77 sq mi (84.88 km^{2})
  - Water: 0.19 sq mi (0.49 km^{2})
- Elevation: 663 ft (202 m)

Population (2020)
  - Total: 4,328
  - Density: 132.1/sq mi (50.99/km^{2})
- Time zone: UTC-5 (Eastern (EST))
  - Summer (DST): UTC-4 (EDT)
- ZIP code: 12019
- Area code: 518
- FIPS code: 36-13926
- GNIS feature ID: 0978812
- Website: Town of Charlton

Charlton is a town in Saratoga County, New York, United States. The population was 4,328 at the 2020 census.

The Town of Charlton is located in the southwestern part of the county and is north of Schenectady. The town is home to the Charlton Historic District, which is home to many historic buildings.

== History ==
The region was first settled circa 1680 by travelers from the small village of Charlton, located in Worcestershire, United Kingdom. The town was formed in 1792 from the Town of Ballston, immediately after Saratoga County was established. The town was previously known as "Freehold" due to the number of settlers from New Jersey.

== Notable people ==
- John W. Taylor, Congressman, Speaker of the House.
- A. B. Earle, pastor, evangelist, author

== Geography ==
According to the United States Census Bureau, the town has a total area of 32.8 square miles (85 km^{2}), of which 32.8 square miles (85 km^{2}) is land and 0.04 square miles (0.10 km^{2}) (0.06%) is water.

The southern town line is the border of Schenectady County, and the western town boundary is the border of Montgomery County.

New York State Route 67 (Amsterdam Road) is an east-west highway which intersects New York State Route 147, a north-south highway, north of West Charlton.

The town borders Galway to the North, Ballston to the east, Glenville to the south, and Amsterdam to the west.

== Demographics ==
Historical population
Census	Pop.	Note	%±
1800	1,746		—
1810	1,946		11.5%
1820	1,953		0.4%
1830	2,023		3.6%
1840	1,933		−4.4%
1850	1,902		−1.6%
1860	1,752		−7.9%
1870	1,607		−8.3%
1880	1,474		−8.3%
1890	1,175		−20.3%
1900	1,109		−5.6%
1910	1,030		−7.1%
1920	914		−11.3%
1930	978		7.0%
1940	1,063		8.7%
1950	1,298		22.1%
1960	3,024		133.0%
1970	3,772		24.7%
1980	4,019		6.5%
1990	3,984		−0.9%
2000	3,954		−0.8%
2010	4,133		4.5%
2020	4,328		4.7%
U.S. Decennial Census

As of the census of 2000, there were 3,954 people, 1,429 households, and 1,204 families residing in the town. The population density was 120.5 inhabitants per square mile (46.5/km^{2}). There were 1,464 housing units at an average density of 44.6 per square mile (17.2/km^{2}). The racial makeup of the town was 98.46% White, 0.28% African American, 0.15% Native American, 0.32% Asian, 0.10% from other races, and 0.68% from two or more races. Hispanic or Latino of any race were 0.96% of the population.

There were 2,429 households, out of which 34.7% had children under the age of 18 living with them, 75.4% were married couples living together, 5.3% had a male householder with no wife present, and 15.7% were non-families. 12.9% of all households were made up of individuals, and 6.6% had someone living alone who was 65 years of age or older. The average household size was 2.74 and the average family size was 3.00.

In the town, the population was spread out, with 25.2% under the age of 18, 5.4% from 18 to 24, 24.2% from 25 to 44, 31.9% from 45 to 64, and 13.3% who were 65 years of age or older. The median age was 42 years. For every 100 females, there were 95.2 males. For every 100 females age 18 and over, there were 96.0 males.

The median income for a household in the town was $102,059, and the per capita income was $46,884. About 4.4% of persons were below the poverty line.

== Communities and locations in Charlton ==
- Blue Corners – A hamlet.
- Charlton – A hamlet south of the town center on County Roads 51 and 52. The Charlton Historic District was listed on the National Register of Historic Places in 1976.
- Harmony Corners – A hamlet in the northeastern corner of the town on NY-67.
- Holbrook Corners – A hamlet near the northern town line, located on NY-67.
- Komar Park – A hamlet near the southeastern part of Charlton..
- Tucker Heights – A hamlet by the southern town line.
- West Charlton – A hamlet northwest of Charlton, located on NY-147. The West Charlton United Presbyterian Church was listed on the National Register of Historic Places in 1998.
- Wheeler Estates – A location in the southeastern section of Charlton.
