= West Charlton United Presbyterian Church =

Historic church in New York, United States

- U.S. National Register of Historic Places
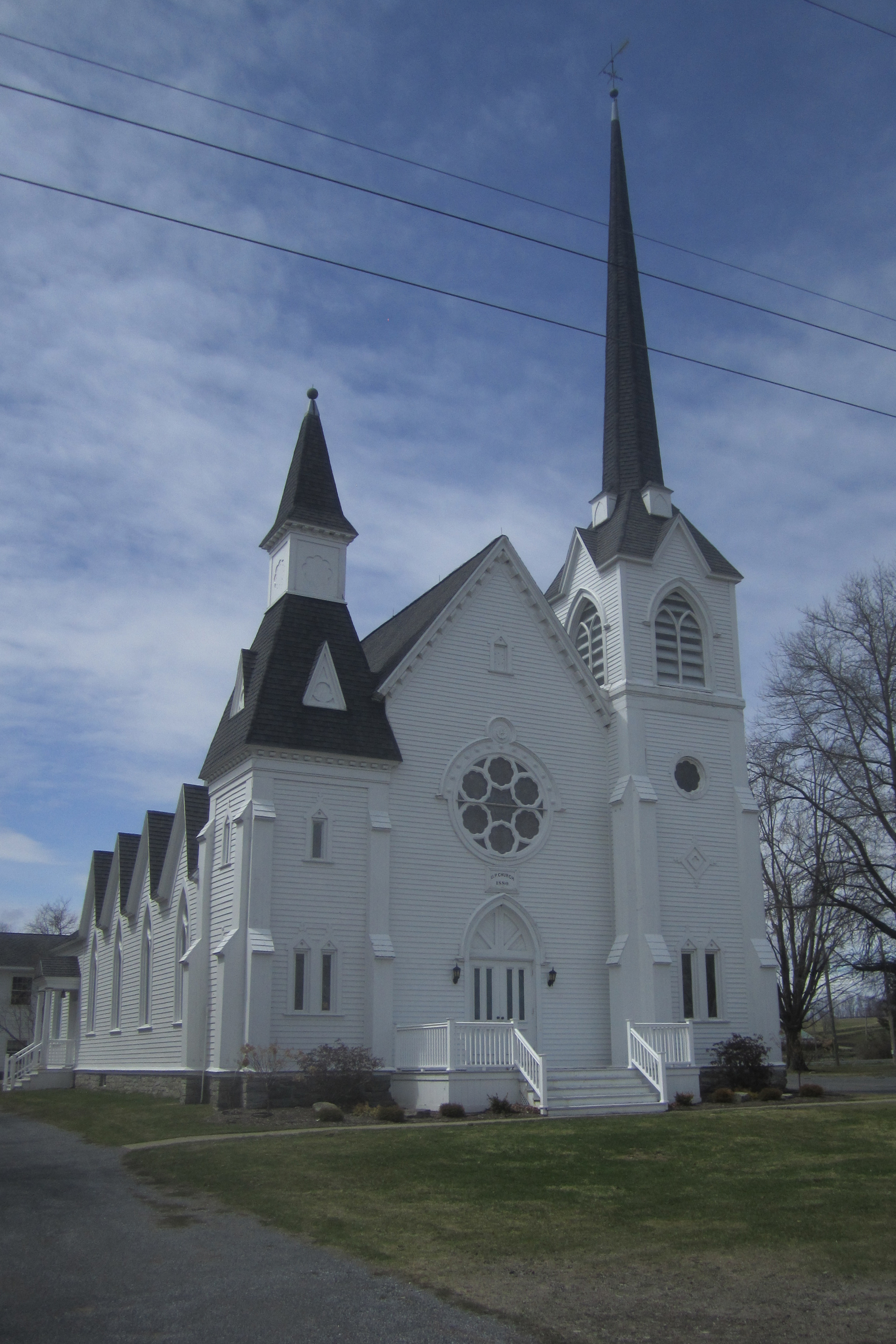

- Location within New York Location within the United States
- Location: 1331 Sacandaga Rd., West Charlton, New York
- Coordinates: 42°58′22″N 74°1′50″W
- Area: 2.1 acres (0.85 ha)
- Built: c1880
- Architect: Nichols, Charles C.; Hall Bros.
- Architectural style: Late Victorian
- NRHP reference No.: 98000127
- Added to NRHP: February 20, 1998

West Charlton United Presbyterian Church, also known as "Scotch Church," is a historic Presbyterian church at 1331 Sacandaga Road in West Charlton, Saratoga County, New York. It was built about 1880 and is a rectangular, wood-frame building in the Late Victorian style. It features engaged corner towers and a polygonal chapel added in 1904. The north tower supports a louvered belfry topped by a tall spire. The church was founded by immigrants from Scotland.

It was listed on the National Register of Historic Places in 1998.
