= List of Speaker of the United States House of Representatives elections =

An election for speaker of the United States House of Representatives is held when the House first convenes after a general election for its two-year term, or when a sitting speaker dies, resigns, or is removed from the position. The speaker is the political and parliamentary leader of the House, and is simultaneously the body's presiding officer, the de facto leader of the body's majority party, and the institution's administrative head.

A speaker election is generally held at least every two years; the House has elected a Speaker 129 times since the office was created in 1789. Traditionally, each political party's caucus/conference selects a candidate for speaker from among its senior leaders prior to the vote, and the majority party's nominee is elected. Prior to 1839, the House elected its speaker by paper ballot, but since, on all but three occasions, has done so by roll call vote. A majority of votes cast (as opposed to a majority of the full membership of the House) is necessary to elect a speaker. By House precedents, votes of present are not to be included in the official vote total, only votes cast for a person by name are; even so, they have been counted on several occasions.

If no candidate receives a majority vote, then the roll call is repeated until a speaker is elected. Multiple rounds of voting have been necessary 16 times since 1789, almost all before the American Civil War. In the 20th century only one election went to multiple ballots (in 1923). In the 21st century, it has happened twice in the same year, in January and in October 2023.

Representatives are not restricted to voting for the candidate nominated by their party, but generally do. Additionally, as the U.S. Constitution does not explicitly state that the speaker must be an incumbent member of the House, it is permissible for representatives to vote for someone who is not a member of the House at the time, and non-members have received a few votes in various speaker elections over the past several years. Nevertheless, every person elected speaker has been a member.

Altogether, 56 people have served as speaker over the past 237 years; 32 of them served multiple terms and seven of those served nonconsecutive terms. Sam Rayburn holds the record for electoral victories, with 10. He led the House from September 1940 to January 1947, January 1949 to January 1953, and January 1955 to November 1961 (a tenure totaling 17 years).

== Elections from 1789 to 1799 ==
=== April 1789 ===
The first-ever election for speaker of the House took place on April 1, 1789, at the start of the 1st Congress, following the 1788–89 elections in which candidates who supported the new Constitution won a majority of the seats. Frederick Muhlenberg, who had promoted the ratification of the Constitution, received a majority of the votes cast and was elected speaker. Though political parties did not yet exist, political factions, from which they evolved, formed almost immediately after Congress began its work. Those who supported the Washington administration were referred to as "Pro-Administration", while those in opposition were known as "Anti-Administration".

1789 election for speaker
Party	Candidate	Votes	%
Pro-Administration	Frederick Muhlenberg (PA at-large)	23	76.67
—	Others	7	23.33
Total votes		30	100
Votes necessary		16	>50

=== October 1791 ===
An election for speaker took place on October 24, 1791, at the start of the 2nd Congress, following the 1790–91 elections in which Pro-Administration candidates won a majority of the seats. Jonathan Trumbull Jr. received a majority of the votes cast and was elected speaker.

1791 election for speaker
Party	Candidate	Votes	%
Pro-Administration	Jonathan Trumbull Jr. (CT at-large)	Majority	(Note: As the specific number of votes in the 1791 speaker election is not known, a candidate vote percentage is indeterminable.)
Total votes		(?)	100
Votes necessary		(?)	>50

=== December 1793 ===
An election for speaker took place on December 2, 1793, at the start of the 3rd Congress, following the 1792–93 elections, in which anti-administration candidates won a majority of the seats. The faction was unable, however, to turn this numerical advantage into victory in the election for speaker, as several of them were not in attendance for the vote. Consequently, several Anti-Administration members voted strategically for former speaker Frederick Muhlenberg, a Pro-Administration moderate, who received a majority of the votes cast in the 3rd ballot and was elected speaker. This was the first speaker of the House election to be contested primarily on a partisan basis.

1793 election for speaker
December 2, 1793 – 1st ballot
Party	Candidate	Votes	%
Pro-Administration	Theodore Sedgwick (MA 2)	24	36.36
Pro-Administration	Frederick Muhlenberg (PA at-large)	21	31.82
Anti-Administration	Abraham Baldwin (GA at-large)	14	21.22
—	Others	7	10.60
Total votes:		66	100
Votes necessary:		34	>50
December 2, 1793 – 3rd Ballot
Party	Candidate	Votes	%
Pro-Administration	Frederick Muhlenberg (PA at-large)	37	(Note: As the specific number of third ballot votes for others in the 1793 speaker election is not known, candidate vote percentages are indeterminable.)
Pro-Administration	Theodore Sedgwick (MA 2)	27	(Note: As the specific number of third ballot votes for others in the 1793 speaker election is not known, candidate vote percentages are indeterminable.)
—	Others	(?)	(Note: As the specific number of third ballot votes for others in the 1793 speaker election is not known, candidate vote percentages are indeterminable.)
Total votes:		64+	100
Votes necessary:		~34	>50

=== December 1795 ===
An election for speaker took place on December 7, 1795, at the start of the 4th Congress, following the 1794–95 elections. During the preceding Congress, the Pro-Administration faction coalesced into the Federalist Party, and the Anti-Administration faction into the Democratic-Republican Party. Though Democratic-Republicans won a majority of the seats in these elections, several joined with the Federalists to elect Jonathan Dayton speaker on the first ballot.

1795 election for speaker
Party	Candidate	Votes	%
Federalist	Jonathan Dayton (NJ at-large)	46	58.23
Democratic-Republican	Frederick Muhlenberg (PA 2) (incumbent)	31	39.24
—	Others	2	2.53
Total votes		79	100
Votes necessary		40	>50

=== May 1797 ===
An election for speaker took place on May 15, 1797, at the start (Note: This was the date upon which the House met for the first time during a special session of Congress, convened by presidential proclamation in accordance with Article II, Section 3, Clause 3 of the Constitution; it is not necessarily the start date of the special session.) of the 5th Congress, following the 1796–97 elections in which Federalists won a majority of the seats. In a near-unanimous vote, Jonathan Dayton was re-elected speaker.

1797 election for speaker
Party	Candidate	Votes	%
Federalist	Jonathan Dayton (NJ at-large) (incumbent)	78	97.50
Federalist	George Dent (MD 1)	1	1.25
Democratic-Republican	Abraham Baldwin (GA at-large)	1	1.25
Total votes		80	100
Votes necessary		41	>50

=== December 1799 ===
An election for speaker took place on December 2, 1799, at the start of the 6th Congress, following the 1798–99 elections in which Federalists won a majority of the seats. Theodore Sedgwick received a majority of the votes cast in the 2nd ballot and was elected speaker.

1799 election for speaker
December 2, 1799 – 1st Ballot
Party	Candidate	Votes	%
Federalist	Theodore Sedgwick (MA 1)	42	49.41
Democratic-Republican	Nathaniel Macon (NC 5)	27	31.76
Federalist	George Dent (MD 1)	13	15.30
Federalist	John Rutledge Jr. (SC 2)	2	2.36
Democratic-Republican	Thomas Sumter (SC 4)	1	1.17
Total votes:		85	100
Votes necessary:		43	>50
December 2, 1799 – 2nd ballot
Party	Candidate	Votes	%
Federalist	Theodore Sedgwick (MA 1)	44	51.16
Democratic-Republican	Nathaniel Macon (NC 5)	38	46.51
Federalist	George Dent (MD 1)	3	1.75
Federalist	John Rutledge Jr. (SC 2)	1	0.58
Total votes:		86	100
Votes necessary:		44	>50

== Elections from 1801 to 1899 ==
=== December 1801 ===
An election for speaker took place on December 7, 1801, at the start of the 7th Congress, following the 1800–01 elections in which Democratic-Republicans won a majority of the seats. Nathaniel Macon received a majority of the votes cast and was elected speaker.

1801 election for speaker
Party	Candidate	Votes	%
Democratic-Republican	Nathaniel Macon (NC 5)	53	65.43
Federalist	James A. Bayard (DE at-large)	26	32.10
Federalist	John C. Smith (CT at-large)	2	2.47
Total votes		81	100
Votes necessary		41	>50

=== October 1803 ===
An election for speaker took place on October 17, 1803, at the start of the 8th Congress, following the 1802–03 elections in which Democratic-Republicans won a majority of the seats. Nathaniel Macon received a majority of the votes cast and was re-elected speaker.

1803 election for speaker
Party	Candidate	Votes	%
Democratic-Republican	Nathaniel Macon (NC 6) (incumbent)	76	71.03
Democratic-Republican	Joseph Varnum (MA 4)	30	28.04
Democratic-Republican	John Dawson (VA 10)	1	0.93
Total votes		107	100
Votes necessary		54	>50

=== December 1805 ===
An election for speaker took place on December 2, 1805, at the start of the 9th Congress, following the 1804–05 elections in which the Democratic-Republicans won a majority of the seats. Nathaniel Macon received a majority of the votes cast in the 3rd ballot and was re-elected speaker. A number of Democratic-Republicans did not support Macon's bid for a third term as he had broken ranks with President Jefferson and aligned himself with the splinter Quids faction.

1805 election for speaker
December 2, 1805 – 1st ballot
Party	Candidate	Votes	%
Democratic-Republican	Nathaniel Macon (NC 6) (incumbent)	51	48.58
Democratic-Republican	Joseph Varnum (MA 4)	26	24.76
Federalist	John C. Smith (CT at-large)	16	15.24
Democratic-Republican	John Dawson (VA 10)	10	9.52
Democratic-Republican	Andrew Gregg (PA 5)	2	1.90
Total votes:		105	100
Votes necessary:		53	>50
December 2, 1805 – 3rd ballot
Party	Candidate	Votes	%
Democratic-Republican	Nathaniel Macon (NC 6) (incumbent)	58	54.71
Democratic-Republican	Joseph Varnum (MA 4)	23	21.70
Federalist	John C. Smith (CT at-large)	18	16.98
Democratic-Republican	John Dawson (VA 10)	3	2.83
Democratic-Republican	Andrew Gregg (PA 5)	2	1.89
—	Others	2	1.89
Total votes:		106	100
Votes necessary:		54	>50

=== October 1807 ===
An election for speaker took place on October 26, 1807, at the start of the 10th Congress, following the 1806–07 elections in which Democratic-Republicans won a majority of the seats. Joseph B. Varnum received a majority of the votes cast and was elected speaker.

1807 election for speaker
Party	Candidate	Votes	%
Democratic-Republican	Joseph Varnum (MA 4)	59	50.43
Federalist	Charles Goldsborough (MD 8)	17	14.53
Democratic-Republican	Burwell Bassett (VA 12)	17	14.53
Democratic-Republican	Josiah Masters (NY 10)	8	6.84
Democratic-Republican	Thomas Blount (NC 3)	7	5.98
—	Others	9	7.69
Total votes		117	100
Votes necessary		59	>50

=== May 1809 ===
An election for speaker took place on May 22, 1809, at the start of the 11th Congress, following the 1808–09 elections in which the Democratic-Republicans won a majority of the seats. On the first ballot, Joseph Varnum received 60 of the 118 votes cast for individuals. In addition to these, two ballots were returned blank. The question arose over whether or not the blank ballots counted. If they were, then the total number of votes cast would be 120, making the threshold for election 61. If they were not, then the threshold would be 60 (of 118), thus making Varnum the winner. After a brief debate a motion to proceed with a second ballot was approved. Varnum received a majority of the votes cast in the 2nd ballot and was re-elected speaker.

1809 election for speaker
May 22, 1809 – 1st Ballot
Party	Candidate	Votes	%
Democratic-Republican	Joseph Varnum (MA 4) (incumbent)	60	50.00
Democratic-Republican	Nathaniel Macon (NC 6)	36	30.00
Federalist	Timothy Pitkin (CT at-large)	20	16.67
Democratic-Republican	Roger Nelson (MD 4)	1	0.83
Federalist	Charles Goldsborough (MD 8)	1	0.83
—	Blank	2	1.67
Total votes:		120	100
Votes necessary:		61	>50
May 22, 1809 – 2nd ballot
Party	Candidate	Votes	%
Democratic-Republican	Joseph Varnum (MA 4) (incumbent)	65	54.62
Democratic-Republican	Nathaniel Macon (NC 6)	45	37.82
Federalist	Timothy Pitkin (CT at-large)	6	5.04
Democratic-Republican	Benjamin Howard (KY 5)	1	0.84
Democratic-Republican	Roger Nelson (MD 4)	1	0.84
Federalist	Charles Goldsborough (MD 8)	1	0.84
Total votes:		119	100
Votes necessary:		60	>50

=== November 1811 ===
An election for speaker took place on November 4, 1811, at the start of the 12th Congress, following the 1810–11 elections in which Democratic-Republicans won a majority of the seats. Henry Clay, a freshman congressman, received a majority of the votes cast and was elected speaker. This marks the only time in American History a Speaker of the House was elected on their first ever day on its floor.

1811 election for speaker
Party	Candidate	Votes	%
Democratic-Republican	Henry Clay (KY 2)	75	63.03
Democratic-Republican	William W. Bibb (GA at-large)	38	31.93
Democratic-Republican	Nathaniel Macon (NC 6)	3	2.52
Democratic-Republican	Hugh Nelson (VA 21)	2	1.68
Democratic-Republican	Burwell Bassett (VA 12)	1	0.84
Total votes		119	100
Votes necessary		60	>50

=== May 1813 ===
An election for speaker took place on May 24, 1813, at the start of the 13th Congress, following the 1812–13 elections in which Democratic-Republicans won a majority of the seats. Henry Clay received a majority of the votes cast and was re-elected speaker.

1813 election for speaker
Party	Candidate	Votes	%
Democratic-Republican	Henry Clay (KY 5) (incumbent)	89	60.13
Federalist	Timothy Pitkin (CT at-large)	54	36.49
—	Others	5	3.38
Total votes		148	100
Votes necessary		75	>50

=== January 1814 ===
On January 19, 1814, during the second session of the 13th Congress, Henry Clay resigned as speaker to accept a commission from President James Madison to serve as a negotiator for a peace agreement to end the War of 1812. Later that day, an intra-term election for a new speaker was held. Langdon Cheves received a majority of the votes cast and was elected speaker.

1814 special election for speaker
Party	Candidate	Votes	%
Democratic-Republican	Langdon Cheves (SC 1)	94	56.97
Democratic-Republican	Felix Grundy (TN 5)	59	35.76
—	Others	12	7.27
Total votes		165	100
Votes necessary		83	>50

=== December 1815 ===
An election for speaker took place on December 4, 1815, at the start of the 14th Congress following the 1814–15 elections in which Democratic-Republicans won a majority of the seats. Elected again to the House, former speaker Henry Clay received a majority of the votes cast and was elected speaker.

1815 election for speaker
Party	Candidate	Votes	%
Democratic-Republican	Henry Clay (KY 2)	87	71.31
Democratic-Republican	Hugh Nelson (VA 22)	13	10.65
Federalist	Timothy Pitkin (CT at-large)	9	7.38
Democratic-Republican	Nathaniel Macon (NC 6)	7	5.74
Federalist	Joseph Lewis Jr. (VA 8)	2	1.64
Federalist	Timothy Pickering (MA 3)	1	0.82
—	Blank	3	2.46
Total votes		122	100
Votes necessary		62	>50

=== December 1817 ===
An election for speaker took place on December 1, 1817, at the start of the 15th Congress following the 1816–17 elections in which Democratic-Republicans won a majority of the seats. In a near-unanimous vote, Henry Clay was re-elected speaker.

1817 election for speaker
Party	Candidate	Votes	%
Democratic-Republican	Henry Clay (KY 2) (incumbent)	143	95.33
Democratic-Republican	Samuel Smith (MD 5)	6	4.00
—	Blank	1	0.67
Total votes		150	100
Votes necessary		76	>50

=== December 1819 ===
An election for speaker took place on December 6, 1819, at the start of the 16th Congress following the 1818–19 elections in which Democratic-Republicans won a majority of the seats. In a near-unanimous vote, Henry Clay was re-elected speaker.

1819 election for speaker
Party	Candidate	Votes	%
Democratic-Republican	Henry Clay (KY 2) (incumbent)	147	94.84
—	Others	8	5.16
Total votes		155	100
Votes necessary		78	>50

=== November 1820 ===
In October 1820, between the first and the second session of the 16th Congress, Henry Clay resigned as speaker so he could return to his private law practice; he kept his House seat however, until his term ended the following March (he had not run for re-election in 1820). Consequently, an intra-term election for a new speaker was held on November 13–15, 1820. Coming as it did less than a year after the rancorous Missouri statehood debate, the choice of Clay's successor became mired in the continuing national debate between Northerners and Southerners over the expansion of slavery into territories and future states. The chief candidate of Northern antislavery members, John W. Taylor of New York, finally received a majority of the votes cast in the 22nd ballot and was elected speaker. In addition to discord over slavery, Taylor's path to victory was made even more difficult by a division within that state's congressional delegation between supporters of Governor DeWitt Clinton and those who opposed him (known as the Bucktails).

1820 special election for speaker
November 13, 1820 – 1st ballot
Party	Candidate	Votes	%
Democratic-Republican	John W. Taylor (NY 11)	40	30.30
Democratic-Republican	William Lowndes (SC 2)	34	25.75
Democratic-Republican	Samuel Smith (MD 5)	27	20.45
Federalist	John Sergeant (PA 1)	18	13.65
Democratic-Republican	Hugh Nelson (VA 22)	10	7.58
—	Others	3	2.27
Total votes		132	100
Votes necessary		67	>50
November 15, 1820 – 22nd ballot
Party	Candidate	Votes	%
Democratic-Republican	John W. Taylor (NY 11)	76	51.35
Democratic-Republican	William Lowndes (SC 2)	44	29.73
Democratic-Republican	Samuel Smith (MD 5)	27	18.25
—	Others	1	0.67
Total votes		148	100
Votes necessary		75	>50

=== December 1821 ===
An election for speaker took place December 3–4, 1821, at the start of the 17th Congress, following the 1820–21 elections in which the Democratic-Republicans won a majority of the seats. Philip P. Barbour received a majority of the votes cast in the 12th ballot and was elected speaker.

1821 election for speaker
December 3, 1821 – 1st ballot
Party	Candidate	Votes	%
Democratic-Republican	John W. Taylor (NY 11) (incumbent)	60	37.26
Democratic-Republican	Caesar A. Rodney (DE at-large)	45	27.95
Federalist	Louis McLane (DE at-large)	29	18.01
Democratic-Republican	Samuel Smith (MD 5)	20	12.42
Democratic-Republican	Hugh Nelson (VA 22)	5	3.11
—	Others	2	1.24
Total votes:		161	100
Votes necessary:		81	>50
December 4, 1821 – 12th ballot
Party	Candidate	Votes	%
Democratic-Republican	Philip P. Barbour (VA 11)	88	51.16
Democratic-Republican	John W. Taylor (NY 11) (incumbent)	67	38.95
Democratic-Republican	Henry Baldwin (PA 14)	6	3.49
Democratic-Republican	Samuel Smith (MD 5)	4	2.33
Democratic-Republican	Caesar A. Rodney (DE at-large)	3	1.74
—	Others	4	2.33
Total votes:		172	100
Votes necessary:		87	>50

=== December 1823 ===
An election for speaker took place on December 1, 1823, at the start of the 18th Congress following the 1822–23 elections in which Democratic-Republicans won a majority of the seats. Elected again to the House, former speaker Henry Clay received a majority of the votes cast and was elected speaker.

1823 election for speaker
Party	Candidate	Votes	%
Democratic-Republican	Henry Clay (KY 3)	139	76.80
Democratic-Republican	Philip P. Barbour (VA 11) (incumbent)	42	23.20
Total votes		181	100
Votes necessary		91	>50

=== December 1825 ===
An election for speaker took place on December 5, 1825, at the start of the 19th Congress, following the 1824–25 elections and the 1825 presidential contingent election. In the aftermath of these elections, the Democratic-Republican Party rapidly splintered between those who supported the new president, John Quincy Adams, and those who supported Andrew Jackson. Representatives who supported Adams held a slim majority in the House. Former speaker John W. Taylor received a majority of the votes cast in the 2nd ballot and was elected speaker.

1825 election for speaker
December 5, 1825 – 1st ballot
Party	Candidate	Votes	%
Adams	John W. Taylor (NY 17)	89	45.88
Adams	John W. Campbell (OH 5)	41	21.13
Jackson	Louis McLane (DE at-large)	36	18.55
Jackson	Andrew Stevenson (VA 16)	17	8.76
Adams	Lewis Condict (NJ at-large)	6	3.10
—	Others	5	2.58
Total votes:		194	100
Votes necessary:		98	>50
December 5, 1825 – 2nd ballot
Party	Candidate	Votes	%
Adams	John W. Taylor (NY 17)	99	51.30
Jackson	Louis McLane (DE at-large)	44	22.80
Adams	John W. Campbell (OH 5)	42	21.76
Jackson	Andrew Stevenson (VA 16)	5	2.59
—	Others	3	1.55
Total votes:		193	100
Votes necessary:		97	>50

=== December 1827 ===
An election for speaker took place on December 3, 1827, at the start of the 20th Congress following the 1826–27 elections in which Jacksonians, candidates supporting Andrew Jackson in opposition to President John Quincy Adams won a majority of the seats. Andrew Stevenson won a majority of the votes cast and was elected speaker.

1827 election for speaker
Party	Candidate	Votes	%
Jacksonian	Andrew Stevenson (VA 16)	104	50.73
Adams	John W. Taylor (NY 17) (incumbent)	94	45.86
Jacksonian	Philip P. Barbour (VA 11)	4	1.95
—	Others	3	1.46
Total votes		205	100
Votes necessary		103	>50

=== December 1829 ===
An election for speaker took place on December 7, 1829, at the start of the 21st Congress following the 1828–29 elections in which Jacksonians, candidates supporting now-President Andrew Jackson won a majority of the seats. Andrew Stevenson won a majority of the votes cast and was re-elected speaker.

1829 election for speaker
Party	Candidate	Votes	%
Jacksonian	Andrew Stevenson (VA 16) (incumbent)	152	79.58
—	Others	39	20.42
Total votes		191	100
Votes necessary		96	>50

=== December 1831 ===
An election for speaker took place on December 5, 1831, at the start of the 22nd Congress following the 1830–31 elections in which Jacksonians won a majority of the seats. Andrew Stevenson won a majority of the votes cast and was re-elected speaker.

1831 election for speaker
Party	Candidate	Votes	%
Jacksonian	Andrew Stevenson (VA 16) (incumbent)	98	50.26
Jacksonian	Joel B. Sutherland (PA 1)	54	27.69
Anti-Jacksonian	John W. Taylor (NY 17)	18	9.23
Jacksonian	Charles A. Wickliffe (KY 9)	15	7.69
Anti-Jacksonian	Lewis Condict (NJ 1)	4	2.05
—	Others	6	3.08
Total votes		195	100
Votes necessary		98	>50

=== December 1833 ===
An election for speaker took place on December 2, 1833, at the start of the 23rd Congress following the 1832–33 elections in which Jacksonians won a majority of the seats. Andrew Stevenson won a majority of the votes cast and was re-elected speaker.

1833 election for speaker
Party	Candidate	Votes	%
Jacksonian	Andrew Stevenson (VA 11) (incumbent)	142	65.44
Anti-Jacksonian	Lewis Williams (NC 13)	39	17.97
Anti-Jacksonian	Edward Everett (MA 4)	15	6.91
Jacksonian	John Bell (TN 7)	4	1.84
—	Others	9	4.15
—	Blank	8	3.69
Total votes		217	100
Votes necessary		109	>50

=== June 1834 ===
In June 1834, Andrew Stevenson resigned as speaker of the House and from Congress to accept President Andrew Jackson's nomination as the U.S. minister to the United Kingdom. Consequently, an intra-term election for a new speaker was held on June 2, 1834, during the 23rd Congress. The president favored James K. Polk for the post, but when members of his "Kitchen Cabinet" went to Capitol Hill and lobbied on Polk's behalf, they were rebuffed. Perceived as an encroachment upon a constitutional prerogative of the House, the effort to influence the vote splintered Jacksonian party unity and energized the opposition. John Bell ultimately received a majority of the votes cast in the 10th ballot and was elected speaker. (Note: Though Bell won the special election thanks to opposition support, he promoted President Jackson's agenda throughout the balance of the 23rd Congress. Bell openly broke with the president, however, in 1835, by endorsing Tennessee Senator Hugh White, rather than Democratic Party nominee Martin Van Buren, as Jackson's successor. Bell was branded a "hypocritical apostate" and expelled from the party.)

1834 special election for speaker
June 2, 1834 – 1st ballot
Party	Candidate	Votes	%
Jacksonian	Richard H. Wilde (GA at-large)	64	29.09
Jacksonian	James K. Polk (TN 9)	42	19.09
Jacksonian	Joel B. Sutherland (PA 1)	34	15.45
Jacksonian	John Bell (TN 7)	30	13.64
Jacksonian	Jesse Speight (NC 4)	18	8.18
Jacksonian	James M. Wayne (GA at-large)	15	6.82
Anti-Jacksonian	Lewis Williams (NC 13)	4	1.82
Anti-Jacksonian	Edward Everett (MA 4)	3	1.36
—	Others	6	2.73
—	Blank	4	1.82
Total votes:		220	100
Votes necessary:		111	>50
June 2, 1834 – 10th ballot
Party	Candidate	Votes	%
Jacksonian	John Bell (TN 7)	114	52.29
Jacksonian	James K. Polk (TN 9)	78	35.78
Jacksonian	Richard H. Wilde (GA at-large)	11	5.05
Jacksonian	James M. Wayne (GA at-large)	6	2.75
Jacksonian	Joel B. Sutherland (PA 1)	2	0.92
Jacksonian	Jesse Speight (NC 4)	1	0.46
—	Blank	6	2.75
Total votes:		218	100
Votes necessary:		110	>50

=== December 1835 ===
An election for speaker took place on December 7, 1835, at the start of the 24th Congress, following the 1834–35 elections in which Jacksonians won a majority of the seats. James K. Polk won a majority of the votes cast and was elected speaker.

1835 election for speaker
Party	Candidate	Votes	%
Jacksonian	James K. Polk (TN 9)	132	58.67
Anti-Jacksonian	John Bell (TN 7) (incumbent)	84	37.33
Anti-Jacksonian	Charles F. Mercer (VA 14)	3	1.33
Anti-Masonic	John Quincy Adams (MA 12)	2	0.89
Anti-Jacksonian	Francis Granger (NY 26)	1	0.44
—	Blank	3	1.33
Total votes		225	100
Votes necessary		113	>50

=== September 1837 ===
An election for speaker took place on September 4, 1837, at the start of the 25th Congress, following the 1836–37 elections in which Democrats won a majority of the seats. James K. Polk won a majority of the votes cast and was re-elected speaker.

1837 election for speaker
Party	Candidate	Votes	%
Democratic	James K. Polk (TN 9) (incumbent)	116	51.79
Whig	John Bell (TN 7)	103	45.98
—	Others	5	2.23
Total votes		224	100
Votes necessary		113	>50

=== December 1839 ===
An election for speaker took place December 14–16, 1839, at the start of the 26th Congress, following the 1838–39 elections in which the Democrats won a slim majority of the seats. Balloting was delayed for two weeks as Democrats and Whigs contested the seating of five representatives-elect from New Jersey, commencing only after the House resolved not to seat either delegation immediately. Once underway, the narrowly divided House was unable to make a quick choice. Finally, on the 11th ballot, Robert M. T. Hunter received a majority of the votes cast and was elected speaker.

1839 election for speaker
December 14, 1839 – 1st ballot
Party	Candidate	Votes	%
Democratic	John W. Jones (VA 3)	113	48.09
Whig	John Bell (TN 7)	102	43.40
Whig	William Dawson (GA at-large)	11	4.68
Democratic	Francis W. Pickens (SC 5)	5	2.13
Democratic	Dixon H. Lewis (AL 4)	3	1.28
Conservative	George W. Hopkins (VA 18)	1	0.42
Total votes:		235	100
Votes necessary:		118	>50
December 16, 1839 – 11th ballot
Party	Candidate	Votes	%
Whig	Robert M. T. Hunter (VA 9)	119	51.29
Democratic	John W. Jones (VA 3)	55	23.71
Democratic	George M. Keim (PA 9)	24	10.35
Democratic	Zadok Casey (IL 2)	10	4.31
Democratic	Francis W. Pickens (SC 5)	9	3.88
Democratic	Francis Thomas (MD 6)	3	1.29
—	Others	12	5.17
Total votes:		232	100
Votes necessary:		117	>50

=== May 1841 ===
An election for speaker took place on May 31, 1841, at the start of the 27th Congress, following the 1840–41 elections in which Whigs won a majority of the seats. John White won a majority of the votes cast and was elected speaker.

1841 election for speaker
Party	Candidate	Votes	%
Whig	John White (KY 9)	121	54.75
Democratic	John W. Jones (VA 3)	84	38.01
Whig	Henry A. Wise (VA 8)	8	3.62
Whig	Joseph Lawrence (PA 21)	5	2.26
Whig	George N. Briggs (MA 7)	1	0.45
Democratic	Nathan Clifford (ME 1)	1	0.45
Whig	William C. Johnson (MD 5)	1	0.45
Total votes		221	100
Votes necessary		111	>50

=== December 1843 ===
An election for speaker took place on December 4, 1843, at the start of the 28th United States Congress following the 1842–43 elections in which Democrats won a majority of the seats. John W. Jones received a majority of the votes cast and was elected speaker.

1843 election for speaker
Party	Candidate	Votes	%
Democratic	John W. Jones (VA 6)	128	68.09
Whig	John White (KY 6) (incumbent)	59	31.38
Democratic	William Wilkins (PA 21)	1	0.53
Total votes		188	100
Votes necessary		95	>50

=== December 1845 ===
An election for speaker took place on December 1, 1845, at the start of the 29th United States Congress following the 1844–45 elections in which Democrats won a majority of the seats. John W. Davis received a majority of the votes cast and was elected speaker.

1845 election for speaker
Party	Candidate	Votes	%
Democratic	John W. Davis (IN 6)	119	56.67
Whig	Samuel F. Vinton (OH 12)	72	34.29
Democratic	Moses Norris (NH at-large)	9	4.28
American	William S. Miller (NY 3)	5	2.38
—	Others	5	2.38
Total votes		210	100
Votes necessary		106	>50

=== December 1847 ===
An election for speaker took place on December 6, 1847, at the start of the 30th Congress, following the 1846–47 elections in which the Whigs won a slim majority of the seats. Robert C. Winthrop received a majority of the votes cast in the 3rd ballot and was elected speaker. The election became a multi-ballot affair when a few "Conscience Whigs" initially refused to support Winthrop because he rejected their demand for a pledge to constitute key House committees so as to favor the reporting of antislavery legislation.

1847 election for speaker
December 6, 1847 – 1st ballot
Party	Candidate	Votes	%
Whig	Robert C. Winthrop (MA 1)	108	49.09
Democratic	Linn Boyd (KY 1)	61	27.73
Democratic	Robert McClelland (MI 1)	23	10.45
Democratic	John A. McClernard (IL 2)	11	5.00
Democratic	James McKay (NC 6)	5	2.27
Democratic	Howell Cobb (GA 6)	3	1.37
Whig	James Wilson (NH 3)	2	0.91
—	Others	7	3.18
Total votes:		220	100
Votes necessary:		111	>50
December 6, 1847 – 3rd ballot
Party	Candidate	Votes	%
Whig	Robert C. Winthrop (MA 1)	110	50.46
Democratic	Linn Boyd (KY 1)	64	29.36
Democratic	Robert McClelland (MI 1)	14	6.42
Democratic	John A. McClernard (IL 2)	8	3.67
Democratic	Robert Rhett (SC 7)	7	3.21
Democratic	Armistead Burt (SC 5)	4	1.83
Democratic	Howell Cobb (GA 6)	4	1.83
Whig	James Wilson (NH 3)	2	0.92
—	Others	5	2.30
Total votes:		218	100
Votes necessary:		110	>50

=== December 1849 ===
An election for speaker took place December 3–22, 1849, at the start of the 31st Congress, following the 1848–49 elections in which the Democrats won a slim majority of the seats. Divisions within both the Democratic Party and Whig Party over slavery plus the presence of the new Single-issue antislavery Free Soil Party led to pandemonium in the House and a protracted struggle to elect a speaker. After 59 ballots without a majority choice, the House adopted a plurality rule stating that, if after three more ballots no-one garnered a majority of the votes, the person receiving the highest number of votes on the next ensuing ballot would be declared to have been chosen speaker. On the decisive 63rd ballot, Howell Cobb received the most votes, 102 votes out of 221, or nine less than a majority, and was elected speaker. Altogether, 94 individual congressmen received votes in this election.

1849 election for speaker
December 3, 1849 – 1st ballot
Party	Candidate	Votes	%
Democratic	Howell Cobb (GA 6)	103	46.61
Whig	Robert C. Winthrop (MA 1) (incumbent)	96	43.44
Free Soil	David Wilmot (PA 12)	8	3.62
Whig	Meredith P. Gentry (TN 7)	6	2.71
Whig	Horace Mann (MA 8)	2	0.91
—	Others	6	2.71
Total votes:		221	100
Votes necessary:		111	>50
December 22, 1849 – 63rd ballot
Party	Candidate	Votes	%
Democratic	Howell Cobb (GA 6)	102	46.16
Whig	Robert C. Winthrop (MA 1) (incumbent)	99	44.80
Free Soil	David Wilmot (PA 12)	8	3.62
Whig	Charles S. Morehead (KY 8)	4	1.81
Democratic	William Strong (PA 9)	3	1.34
—	Others	5	2.27
Total votes:		221	100
Votes necessary:		Plurality (Note: Because the 1849 election of Howell Cobb as speaker came as a result of an unconventional rules change, the House adopted a resolution declaring that Cobb had been duly chosen speaker by House members.)	

=== December 1851 ===
An election for speaker took place on December 1, 1851, at the start of the 32nd Congress following the 1850–51 elections in which Democrats won a majority of the seats. Linn Boyd received a majority of the votes cast and was elected speaker.

1851 election for speaker
Party	Candidate	Votes	%
Democratic	Linn Boyd (KY 1)	118	55.40
Whig	Edward Stanly (NC 8)	21	9.86
Whig	Joseph R. Chandler (PA 2)	20	9.39
Whig	Thaddeus Stevens (PA 8)	16	7.51
Democratic	Thomas H. Bayly (VA 7)	8	3.75
Whig	John L. Taylor (OH 8)	6	2.82
Whig	Alexander Evans (MD 5)	4	1.88
Democratic	Thomas S. Bocock (VA 4)	4	1.88
Whig	Meredith P. Gentry (TN 7)	3	1.41
Union	Junius Hillyer (GA 6)	2	0.94
—	Others	11	5.16
Total votes		213	100
Votes necessary		107	>50

=== December 1853 ===
An election for speaker took place on December 5, 1853, at the start of the 33rd Congress following the 1852–53 elections in which Democrats won a majority of the seats. Linn Boyd received a majority of the votes cast and was re-elected speaker.

1853 election for speaker
Party	Candidate	Votes	%
Democratic	Linn Boyd (KY 1) (incumbent)	143	65.90
Whig	Joseph R. Chandler (PA 2)	35	6.13
Whig	Lewis D. Campbell (OH 8)	11	5.07
Whig	Presley Ewing (KY 3)	7	3.23
Whig	Solomon G. Haven (NY 32)	6	2.77
Democratic	James L. Orr (SC 5)	4	1.84
Whig	William Preston (KY 7)	3	1.38
Whig	John G. Miller (MO 5)	3	1.38
Whig	Thomas M. Howe (PA 22)	2	0.92
—	Others	3	1.38
Total votes		217	100
Votes necessary		109	>50

=== December 1855 – February 1856 ===
An election for speaker took place over the course of two months, December 3, 1855, through February 2, 1856, at the start of the 34th Congress, following the 1854–55 elections in which candidates primarily in Northern states running on various fusion tickets—included members from the Whig, Free Soil and American parties, along with members of the nascent Republican Party—grouped together under the Opposition Party label, won a majority of the seats. This new, but transitional, party sprang-up amid the fallout from the Kansas–Nebraska Act (approved by Congress in mid 1854), which had sparked violence over slavery in Kansas and hardened sectional positions on the subject. Personal views on slavery drove members' words and actions during this protracted electoral contest. After 129 ballots without a majority choice, the House once again adopted a plurality rule to break the deadlock. On the decisive 133rd ballot, Nathaniel P. Banks (Note: Nathaniel Banks had been a Democrat during the 33rd Congress, but was re-elected to the 34th Congress on the American (Know Nothing) ticket. During his tenure as speaker, Banks changed his political affiliation again, joining the new Republican Party and supporting its first presidential nominee, John C. Frémont, in the 1856 presidential election.) received the most votes, 103 votes out of 214, or five less than a majority, and was elected speaker. A record 135 individual congressmen (nearly 58% of the House's membership), received votes in this, the longest speaker election in House history.

1855–56 election for speaker
December 3, 1855 – 1st ballot
Party	Candidate	Votes	%
Democratic	William A. Richardson (IL 5)	74	32.89
Opposition	Lewis D. Campbell (OH 3)	53	23.56
American	Humphrey Marshall (KY 7)	30	13.34
American	Nathaniel P. Banks (MA 7)	21	9.33
Opposition	Henry M. Fuller (PA 11)	17	7.56
Opposition	Alexander Pennington (NJ 5)	7	3.11
Opposition	Aaron Harlan (OH 7)	3	1.33
Democratic	John Wheeler (NY 6)	3	1.33
American	Benjamin B. Thurston (RI 2)	3	1.33
Opposition	Israel Washburn Jr. (ME 5)	2	0.89
Opposition	William A. Howard (MI 1)	2	0.89
—	Others	10	4.44
Total votes:		225	100
Votes necessary:		113	>50
February 2, 1856 – 133rd ballot
Party	Candidate	Votes	%
American	Nathaniel P. Banks (MA 7)	103	48.13
Democratic	William Aiken Jr. (SC 2)	100	46.73
Opposition	Henry M. Fuller (PA 11)	6	2.80
Opposition	Lewis D. Campbell (OH 3)	4	1.87
Democratic	Daniel Wells Jr. (WI 1)	1	0.47
Total votes:		214	100
Votes necessary:		Plurality (Note: Because the 1856 election of Nathaniel Banks as speaker came as a result of an unconventional rules change, the House adopted a resolution declaring that Banks had been duly chosen speaker by House members.)	

=== December 1857 ===
An election for speaker took place on December 7, 1857, at the start of the 35th Congress, following the 1856–57 elections in which Democrats won a majority of the seats. James L. Orr received a majority of the votes cast and was elected speaker.

1857 election for speaker
Party	Candidate	Votes	%
Democratic	James L. Orr (SC 5)	128	56.89
Republican	Galusha A. Grow (PA 14)	84	37.33
American	Felix Zollicoffer (TN 8)	3	1.33
Republican	Lewis D. Campbell (OH 3)	3	1.33
American	H. Winter Davis (MD 4)	2	0.90
American	James B. Ricaud (MD 2)	2	0.90
American	Humphrey Marshall (KY 7)	1	0.44
Republican	Francis P. Blair Jr. (MO 1)	1	0.44
Republican	Valentine B. Horton (OH 11)	1	0.44
Total votes		225	100
Votes necessary		113	>50

=== December 1859 – February 1860 ===
An election for speaker took place over the course of eight weeks, December 5, 1859, through February 1, 1860, at the start of the 36th Congress, following the 1858–59 elections in which the Republicans won a plurality of the seats. William Pennington, a freshman congressman, received a majority of the votes cast in the 44th ballot and was elected speaker. In total, 90 representatives received at least one vote during the election. The bitter election dispute deepened the rift between slave states and free states and helped push Southern political leaders further toward secession.

1859–60 election for speaker
December 5, 1859 – 1st ballot
Party	Candidate	Votes	%
Democratic	Thomas S. Bocock (VA 5)	86	37.40
Republican	John Sherman (OH 13)	66	28.70
Republican	Galusha A. Grow (PA 14)	43	18.70
Opposition	Alexander Boteler (VA 8)	14	6.08
Opposition	Thomas A. R. Nelson (TN 1)	5	2.17
Opposition	John A. Gilmer (NC 5)	3	1.30
Anti-Lecompton Democrat	Garnett Adrain (NJ 3)	2	0.87
Anti-Lecompton Democrat	John G. Davis (IN 7)	2	0.87
Anti-Lecompton Democrat	John B. Haskin (NY 9)	2	0.87
—	Others	7	3.04
Total votes:		230	100
Votes necessary:		116	>50
February 1, 1860 – 44th ballot
Party	Candidate	Votes	%
Republican	William Pennington (NJ 5)	117	50.22
Democratic	John A. McClernand (IL 6)	85	36.48
Opposition	John A. Gilmer (NC 5)	16	6.86
Democratic	Martin J. Crawford (GA 2)	4	1.72
Opposition	William N. H. Smith (NC 1)	4	1.72
Democratic	John McQueen (SC 1)	2	0.86
—	Others	5	2.14
Total votes:		233	100
Votes necessary:		117	>50

=== July 1861 ===
An election for speaker took place on July 4, 1861, at the start of the 37th Congress, following the 1860–61 elections in which Republicans won a majority of the seats, and the subsequent secession of several states from the Union at the outset of the Civil War. (Note: As representatives resigned from Congress to join the Confederacy, or were expelled for supporting the rebellion, their seats were declared vacant. Some representatives were seated during the 37th Congress from: Louisiana (2 of 4), Tennessee (3 of 10) and Virginia (4 of 13). None were seated from Alabama, Arkansas, Florida, Georgia, Mississippi, North Carolina, South Carolina or Texas (39 representatives altogether).) Galusha A. Grow received a majority of the votes cast on the first ballot and was elected speaker, but only after his chief opponent, Francis Preston Blair Jr., withdrew following the roll call vote, at which time 28 votes shifted to Grow.

1861 election for speaker (Note: Table shows first ballot vote tally after vote shifts; votes before shifts were: Galusha A. Grow – 71, Francis P. Blair Jr. – 40, John J. Crittenden – 12, John S. Phelps – 7, Clement Vallandingham – 7, Erastus Corning – 6, Samuel S. Cox – 6, William A. Richardson – 3, John A. McClernand – 2, Charles B. Calvert – 1, John W. Crisfield – 1, John W. Noell – 1, George H. Pendleton – 1, and Thaddeus Stevens – 1 (total votes: 159 / votes necessary: 80).)
Party	Candidate	Votes	%
Republican	Galusha A. Grow (PA 14)	99	62.27
Union	John J. Crittenden (KY 8)	12	7.55
Republican	Francis P. Blair Jr. (MO 1)	11	6.91
Democratic	John S. Phelps (MO 6)	7	4.40
Democratic	Clement Vallandingham (OH 3)	7	4.40
Democratic	Erastus Corning (NY 14)	7	4.40
Democratic	Samuel S. Cox (OH 12)	6	3.77
Democratic	William A. Richardson (IL 5)	3	1.89
Democratic	John A. McClernand (IL 6)	2	1.26
Union	Charles B. Calvert (MD 6)	1	0.63
Union	John W. Crisfield (MD 1)	1	0.63
Democratic	John W. Noell (MO 7)	1	0.63
Democratic	George H. Pendleton (OH 1)	1	0.63
Democratic	Hendrick B. Wright (PA 12)	1	0.63
Total votes		159	100
Votes necessary		80	>50

=== December 1863 ===
An election for speaker took place on December 7, 1863, at the start of the 38th Congress, following the 1862–63 elections in which Republicans won only a plurality of the seats, but retained control of the House with the assistance of Unconditional Union members. Schuyler Colfax received a majority of the votes cast and was elected speaker.

1863 election for speaker
Party	Candidate	Votes	%
Republican	Schuyler Colfax (IN 9)	101	55.49
Democratic	Samuel S. Cox (OH 12)	42	23.08
Democratic	John L. Dawson (PA 21)	12	6.59
Union	Robert Mallory (KY 5)	10	5.49
Democratic	Henry G. Stebbins (NY 1)	8	4.40
Union	Austin A. King (MO 6)	6	3.30
Republican	Francis P. Blair Jr. (MO 6)	2	1.10
Democratic	John D. Stiles (PA 6)	1	0.55
Total votes		182	100
Votes necessary		92	>50

=== December 1865 ===
An election for speaker took place on December 4, 1865, at the start of the 39th Congress, following the 1864–65 elections in which Republicans won a majority of the seats. Schuyler Colfax received a majority of the votes cast and was re-elected speaker.

1865 election for speaker
Party	Candidate	Votes	%
Republican	Schuyler Colfax (IN 9) (incumbent)	139	79.43
Democratic	James Brooks (NY 8)	36	20.57
Total votes		175	100
Votes necessary		88	>50

=== March 1867 ===
An election for speaker took place on March 4, 1867, at the start of the 40th Congress, following the 1866–67 elections in which Republicans won a majority of the seats. Schuyler Colfax received a majority of the votes cast and was re-elected speaker.

1867 election for speaker
Party	Candidate	Votes	%
Republican	Schuyler Colfax (IN 9) (incumbent)	127	80.89
Democratic	Samuel S. Marshall (IL 11)	30	19.11
Total votes		157	100
Votes necessary		79	>50

=== March 1869 (40th Congress) ===
On March 3, 1869, the final full day of the 40th Congress, Schuyler Colfax, who was to be sworn into office as the nation's 17th vice president the next day, resigned as speaker. Immediately afterward, the House passed a motion declaring Theodore Pomeroy duly elected speaker in place of Colfax (for one day).

1869 special election for speaker
Party	Candidate	Votes	%
Republican	Theodore M. Pomeroy (NY 24)	Voice	U C

=== March 1869 (41st Congress) ===
An election for speaker took place on March 4, 1869, at the start of the 41st Congress, following the 1868–69 elections in which Republicans won a majority of the seats. James G. Blaine received a majority of the votes cast and was elected speaker.

1869 election for speaker
Party	Candidate	Votes	%
Republican	James G. Blaine (ME 3)	135	70.31
Democratic	Michael C. Kerr (IN 2)	57	29.69
Total votes		192	100
Votes necessary		97	>50

=== March 1871 ===
An election for speaker took place on March 4, 1871, at the start of the 42nd Congress, following the 1870–71 elections in which Republicans won a majority of the seats. James G. Blaine received a majority of the votes cast and was re-elected speaker.

1871 election for speaker
Party	Candidate	Votes	%
Republican	James G. Blaine (ME 3) (incumbent)	126	57.80
Democratic	George W. Morgan (OH 13)	92	42.20
Total votes		218	100
Votes necessary		110	>50

=== December 1873 ===
An election for speaker took place on December 1, 1873, at the start of the 43rd Congress, following the 1872–73 elections in which Republicans won a majority of the seats. James G. Blaine received a majority of the votes cast and was re-elected speaker.

1873 election for speaker
Party	Candidate	Votes	%
Republican	James G. Blaine (ME 3) (incumbent)	189	70.26
Democratic	Fernando Wood (NY 9)	76	28.25
Democratic	Samuel S. Cox (NY 6)	2	0.75
Democratic	Hiester Clymer (PA 8)	1	0.37
Democratic	Alexander H. Stephens (GA 8)	1	0.37
Total votes		269	100
Votes necessary		135	>50

=== December 1875 ===
An election for speaker took place on December 6, 1875, at the start of the 44th Congress, following the 1874–75 elections in which Democrats won a majority of the seats. Michael C. Kerr, who had just returned to Congress after losing re-election two years earlier, received a majority of the votes cast and was elected speaker. This was the first time in 16 years, since 1859, that Democrats controlled the House.

1875 election for speaker
Party	Candidate	Votes	%
Democratic	Michael C. Kerr (IN 3)	173	61.35
Republican	James G. Blaine (ME 3) (incumbent)	106	37.59
Democratic	Alpheus S. Williams (MI 1)	1	0.35
Independent	William B. Anderson (IL 19)	1	0.35
Independent	Alexander Campbell (IL 7)	1	0.35
Total votes		282	100
Votes necessary		142	>50

=== December 1876 ===
Michael C. Kerr died on August 19, 1876, between the first and second sessions of the 44th Congress. Consequently, an intra-term election for a new speaker was held on December 4, 1876, when Congress reconvened. Samuel J. Randall received a majority of the votes cast and was elected speaker.

1876 special election for speaker
Party	Candidate	Votes	%
Democratic	Samuel J. Randall (PA 3)	162	65.59
Republican	James A. Garfield (OH 19)	82	33.20
Republican	Charles G. Williams (WI 1)	1	0.4
Republican	George F. Hoar (MA 2)	1	0.4
Democratic	William Ralls Morrison (IL 17)	1	0.4
Total votes		247	100
Votes necessary		124	>50

=== October 1877 ===
An election for speaker took place on October 15, 1877, at the start of the 45th Congress, following the 1876–77 elections in which Democrats won a majority of the seats, and the electoral crisis spawned by the contentious 1876 presidential election. Samuel J. Randall received a majority of the votes cast and was re-elected speaker.

1877 election for speaker
Party	Candidate	Votes	%
Democratic	Samuel J. Randall (PA 3) (incumbent)	149	53.03
Republican	James A. Garfield (OH 19)	132	46.97
Total votes		281	100
Votes necessary		141	>50

=== March 1879 ===
An election for speaker took place on March 18, 1879, at the start of the 46th Congress, following the 1878–79 elections in which Democrats won only a plurality of the seats, but retained control of power with the help of several Independent Democrats. Samuel J. Randall received a slim majority of the votes cast and was re-elected speaker.

1879 election for speaker
Party	Candidate	Votes	%
Democratic	Samuel J. Randall (PA 3) (incumbent)	144	50.88
Republican	James A. Garfield (OH 19)	125	44.17
Greenback	Hendrick B. Wright (PA 12)	13	4.59
Republican	William D. Kelley (PA 4)	1	0.35
Total votes		283	100
Votes necessary		142	>50

=== December 1881 ===
An election for speaker took place on December 5, 1881, at the start of the 47th Congress following the 1880 elections in which Republicans won a majority of the seats. J. Warren Keifer won a majority of the votes cast and was elected speaker.

1881 election for speaker
Party	Candidate	Votes	%
Republican	J. Warren Keifer (OH 8)	148	51.93
Democratic	Samuel J. Randall (PA 3) (incumbent)	129	45.26
Greenback	Nicholas Ford (MO 9)	8	2.81
Total votes		285	100
Votes necessary		143	>50

=== December 1883 ===
An election for speaker took place on December 3, 1883, at the start of the 48th Congress following the 1882 elections in which Democrats won a majority of the seats. John G. Carlisle received a majority of the votes cast and was elected speaker.

1883 election for speaker
Party	Candidate	Votes	%
Democratic	John G. Carlisle (KY 6)	190	61.69
Republican	J. Warren Keifer (OH 8) (incumbent)	113	36.69
Republican	George D. Robinson (MA 12)	2	0.66
Republican	James W. Wadsworth (NY 27)	1	0.32
Republican	Edward S. Lacey (MI 3)	1	0.32
Readjuster	John S. Wise (VA at-large)	1	0.32
Total votes		308	100
Votes necessary		155	>50

=== December 1885 ===
An election for speaker took place on December 7, 1885, at the start of the 49th Congress following the 1884 elections in which Democrats won a majority of the seats. John G. Carlisle received a majority of the votes cast and was re-elected speaker.

1885 election for speaker
Party	Candidate	Votes	%
Democratic	John G. Carlisle (KY 6) (incumbent)	178	56.33
Republican	Thomas B. Reed (ME 1)	138	43.67
Total votes		316	100
Votes necessary		159	>50

=== December 1887 ===
An election for speaker took place on December 5, 1887, at the start of the 50th Congress following the 1886 elections in which Democrats won a majority of the seats. John G. Carlisle received a majority of the votes cast and was re-elected speaker.

1887 election for speaker
Party	Candidate	Votes	%
Democratic	John G. Carlisle (KY 6) (incumbent)	163	52.24
Republican	Thomas B. Reed (ME 1)	147	47.12
Republican	Charles N. Brumm (PA 13)	2	0.64
Total votes		312	100
Votes necessary		157	>50

=== December 1889 ===
An election for speaker took place on December 2, 1889, at the start of the 51st Congress following the 1888 elections in which Republicans won a majority of the seats. Thomas B. Reed received a majority of the votes cast and was elected speaker.

1889 election for speaker
Party	Candidate	Votes	%
Republican	Thomas B. Reed (ME 1)	166	51.71
Democratic	John G. Carlisle (KY 6) (incumbent)	154	47.98
Democratic	Amos J. Cummings (PA 9)	1	0.31
Total votes		321	100
Votes necessary		161	>50

=== December 1891 ===
An election for speaker took place on December 8, 1891, at the start of the 52nd Congress following the 1890 elections in which Democrats won a majority of the seats. Charles F. Crisp received a majority of the votes cast and was elected speaker.

1891 election for speaker
Party	Candidate	Votes	%
Democratic	Charles F. Crisp (GA 3)	228	71.47
Republican	Thomas B. Reed (ME 1) (incumbent)	83	26.02
Populist	Thomas E. Watson (GA 10)	8	2.51
Total votes		319	100
Votes necessary		160	>50

=== August 1893 ===
An election for speaker took place on August 7, 1893, at the start of the 53rd Congress following the 1892 elections in which Democrats won a majority of the seats. Charles F. Crisp received a majority of the votes cast and was re-elected speaker.

1893 election for speaker
Party	Candidate	Votes	%
Democratic	Charles F. Crisp (GA 3) (incumbent)	213	62.46
Republican	Thomas B. Reed (ME 1)	121	35.49
Populist	Jerry Simpson (KS 7)	7	2.05
Total votes		341	100
Votes necessary		171	>50

=== December 1895 ===
An election for speaker took place on December 2, 1895, at the start of the 54th Congress following the 1894 elections in which Republicans won a majority of the seats. Former speaker Thomas B. Reed received a majority of the votes cast and was elected speaker.

1895 election for speaker
Party	Candidate	Votes	%
Republican	Thomas B. Reed (ME 1)	240	70.18
Democratic	Charles F. Crisp (GA 3) (incumbent)	95	27.78
Populist	John C. Bell (CO 2)	6	1.75
Democratic	David B. Culberson (TX 4)	1	0.29
Total votes		342	100
Votes necessary		172	>50

=== March 1897 ===
An election for speaker took place on March 15, 1897, at the start of the 55th Congress following the 1896 elections in which Republicans won a majority of the seats. Thomas B. Reed received a majority of the votes cast and was re-elected speaker.

1897 election for speaker
Party	Candidate	Votes	%
Republican	Thomas B. Reed (ME 1) (incumbent)	200	59.52
Democratic	Joseph W. Bailey (TX 4)	114	33.93
Populist	John C. Bell (CO 2)	21	6.25
Silver	Francis G. Newlands (NV at-large)	1	0.30
Total votes		336	100
Votes necessary		169	>50

=== December 1899 ===
An election for speaker took place on December 4, 1899, at the start of the 56th Congress following the 1898 elections in which Republicans won a majority of the seats. David B. Henderson received a majority of the votes cast and was elected speaker.

1898 election for speaker
Party	Candidate	Votes	%
Republican	David B. Henderson (IA 3)	177	52.68
Democratic	James D. Richardson (TN 5)	153	45.54
Populist	John C. Bell (CO 2)	4	1.19
Silver	Francis G. Newlands (NV at-large)	2	0.59
Total votes		336	100
Votes necessary		169	>50

== Elections from 1901 to 1999 ==
=== December 1901 ===
An election for speaker took place on December 2, 1901, at the start of the 57th Congress following the 1900 elections in which Republicans won a majority of the seats. David B. Henderson received a majority of the votes cast and was re-elected speaker.

1901 election for speaker
Party	Candidate	Votes	%
Republican	David B. Henderson (IA 3) (incumbent)	192	55.49
Democratic	James D. Richardson (TN 5)	152	43.93
Populist	William L. Stark (NE 4)	1	0.29
Democratic	Amos J. Cummings (NY 10)	1	0.29
Total votes		346	100
Votes necessary		174	>50

=== November 1903 ===
An election for speaker took place on November 9, 1903, at the start of the 58th Congress following the 1902 elections in which Republicans won a majority of the seats. Joseph Cannon received a majority of the votes cast and was elected speaker.

1903 election for speaker
Party	Candidate	Votes	%
Republican	Joseph Cannon (IL 12)	198	54.25
Democratic	John Williams (MS 8)	167	45.75
Total votes		365	100
Votes necessary		183	>50

=== December 1905 ===
An election for speaker took place on December 4, 1905, at the start of the 59th Congress following the 1904 elections in which Republicans won a majority of the seats. Joseph Cannon received a majority of the votes cast and was re-elected speaker.

1905 election for speaker
Party	Candidate	Votes	%
Republican	Joseph Cannon (IL 18) (incumbent)	243	65.50
Democratic	John Williams (MS 8)	128	34.50
Total votes		371	100
Votes necessary		186	>50

=== December 1907 ===
An election for speaker took place on December 2, 1907, at the start of the 60th Congress following the 1906 elections in which Republicans won a majority of the seats. Joseph Cannon received a majority of the votes cast and was re-elected speaker.

1907 election for speaker
Party	Candidate	Votes	%
Republican	Joseph Cannon (IL 18) (incumbent)	213	56.80
Democratic	John Williams (MS 8)	162	43.20
Total votes		375	100
Votes necessary		188	>50

=== March 1909 ===
An election for speaker took place on March 15, 1909, at the start of the 61st Congress following the 1908 elections in which Republicans won a majority of the seats. Joseph Cannon received a majority of the votes cast and was re-elected speaker. Cannon's election to a fourth term as speaker was challenged by a group of dissatisfied progressive Republicans, who voted for other people.

1909 election for speaker
Party	Candidate	Votes	%
Republican	Joseph Cannon (IL 18) (incumbent)	204	53.40
Democratic	Champ Clark (MO 9)	166	43.46
Republican	Henry A. Cooper (WI 1)	8	2.10
Republican	George W. Norris (NE 5)	2	0.52
Republican	John J. Esch (WI 7)	1	0.26
Republican	William P. Hepburn (IA 8)	1	0.26
Total votes		382	100
Votes necessary		192	>50

=== April 1911 ===
An election for speaker took place on April 4, 1911, at the start of the 62nd Congress following the 1910 elections in which Democrats won a majority of the seats. Champ Clark received a majority of the votes cast and was elected speaker. This was the first time in 16 years, since 1895, that Democrats controlled the House.

1911 election for speaker
Party	Candidate	Votes	%
Democratic	Champ Clark (MO 9)	220	59.78
Republican	James R. Mann (IL 2)	131	35.60
Republican	Henry A. Cooper (WI 1)	16	4.35
Republican	George W. Norris (NE 5)	1	0.27
Total votes		368	100
Votes necessary		185	>50

=== April 1913 ===
An election for speaker took place on April 7, 1913, at the start of the 63rd Congress following the 1912 elections in which Democrats won a majority of the seats. Champ Clark received a majority of the votes cast and was re-elected speaker.

1913 election for speaker
Party	Candidate	Votes	%
Democratic	Champ Clark (MO 9) (incumbent)	272	66.99
Republican	James R. Mann (IL 2)	111	27.34
Republican	Victor Murdock (KS 8)	18	4.43
Republican	Henry A. Cooper (WI 1)	4	0.99
Republican	John M. Nelson (WI 3)	1	0.25
Total votes		406	100
Votes necessary		204	>50

=== December 1915 ===
An election for speaker took place on December 6, 1915, at the start of the 64th Congress following the 1914 elections in which Democrats won a majority of the seats. Champ Clark received a majority of the votes cast and was re-elected speaker.

1915 election for speaker
Party	Candidate	Votes	%
Democratic	Champ Clark (MO 9) (incumbent)	222	52.61
Republican	James R. Mann (IL 2)	195	46.21
—	Present	5	1.18
Total votes		422	100
Votes necessary		212	>50

=== April 1917 ===
An election for speaker took place on April 2, 1917, at the start of the 65th Congress following 1916 elections in which Republicans won a plurality of the seats. Even so, Champ Clark received a majority of the votes cast and was re-elected speaker. Democrats were able to retain control of the House by forming a Coalition with third-party (Progressive, Prohibition and Socialist) members.

1917 election for speaker
Party	Candidate	Votes	%
Democratic	Champ Clark (MO 9) (incumbent)	217	50.70
Republican	James R. Mann (IL 2)	205	47.89
Republican	Frederick H. Gillett (MA 2)	2	0.47
Republican	Irvine Lenroot (WI 11)	2	0.47
—	Present	2	0.47
Total votes		428	100
Votes necessary		215	>50

=== May 1919 ===
An election for speaker took place on May 19, 1919, at the start of the 66th Congress following 1918 elections in which Republicans won a majority of the seats. Frederick H. Gillett received a majority of the votes cast and was elected speaker.

1919 election for speaker
Party	Candidate	Votes	%
Republican	Frederick H. Gillett (MA 2)	228	57.00
Democratic	Champ Clark (MO 9) (incumbent)	172	43.00
Total votes		400	100
Votes necessary		201	>50

=== April 1921 ===
An election for speaker took place on April 11, 1921, at the start of the 67th Congress following 1920 elections in which Republicans won a majority of the seats. Frederick H. Gillett received a majority of the votes cast and was re-elected speaker.

1921 election for speaker
Party	Candidate	Votes	%
Republican	Frederick H. Gillett (MA 2) (incumbent)	297	70.01
Democratic	Claude Kitchin (NC 2)	122	29.05
—	Present	1	0.24
Total votes		420	100
Votes necessary		211	>50

=== December 1923 ===
An election for speaker took place December 3–5, 1923, at the start of the 68th Congress, following the 1922 elections in which the Republicans won a majority of the seats. Frederick H. Gillett received a majority of the votes cast in the 9th ballot and was re-elected speaker. Progressive Republicans had refused to support Gillett for the first eight ballots. Only after winning concessions from Republican conference leaders (a seat on the House Rules Committee and a pledge that requested House rules changes would be considered) did they agree to support him.

1923 election for speaker
December 3, 1923 – 1st ballot
Party	Candidate	Votes	%
Republican	Frederick H. Gillett (MA 2) (incumbent)	197	47.58
Democratic	Finis J. Garrett (TN 9)	195	47.10
Republican	Henry A. Cooper (WI 1)	17	4.11
Republican	Martin B. Madden (IL 1)	5	1.21
Total votes:		414	100
Votes necessary:		208	>50
December 5, 1923 – 9th ballot
Party	Candidate	Votes	%
Republican	Frederick H. Gillett (MA 2) (incumbent)	215	51.94
Democratic	Finis J. Garrett (TN 9)	197	47.58
Republican	Martin B. Madden (IL 1)	2	0.48
Total votes:		414	100
Votes necessary:		208	>50

=== December 1925 ===
An election for speaker took place on December 7, 1925, at the start of the 69th Congress following 1924 elections in which Republicans won a majority of the seats. Nicholas Longworth received a majority of the votes cast and was elected speaker, even though progressive Republicans refused to vote for him.

1925 election for speaker
Party	Candidate	Votes	%
Republican	Nicholas Longworth (OH 1)	229	54.52
Democratic	Finis J. Garrett (TN 9)	173	41.19
Republican	Henry A. Cooper (WI 1)	13	3.10
—	Present	5	1.19
Total votes		420	100
Votes necessary		211	>50

=== December 1927 ===
An election for speaker took place on December 5, 1927, at the start of the 70th Congress following 1926 elections in which Republicans won a majority of the seats. Nicholas Longworth received a majority of the votes cast and was re-elected speaker.

1927 election for speaker
Party	Candidate	Votes	%
Republican	Nicholas Longworth (OH 1) (incumbent)	225	53.96
Democratic	Finis J. Garrett (TN 9)	177	42.44
—	Present	5	1.20
Total votes		417	100
Votes necessary		209	>50

=== April 1929 ===
An election for speaker took place on April 15, 1929, at the start of the 71st Congress following 1928 elections in which Republicans won a majority of the seats. Nicholas Longworth received a majority of the votes cast and was re-elected speaker.

1929 election for speaker
Party	Candidate	Votes	%
Republican	Nicholas Longworth (OH 1) (incumbent)	254	63.82
Democratic	John N. Garner (TX 15)	143	35.93
—	Present	1	0.25
Total votes		398	100
Votes necessary		200	>50

=== December 1931 ===
An election for speaker took place on December 7, 1931, at the start of the 72nd Congress, following the 1930 elections in which Republicans won a one-seat majority. However, during the 13 months between Election Day and the start of the new Congress, 14 members-elect died, including the incumbent speaker, Nicholas Longworth, who died on April 9, 1931. After the Republicans lost four of the special elections called to fill the vacancies, when Congress convened, the Democrats held a three-seat majority in the House. John N. Garner received a majority of the votes cast and was elected speaker.

1931 election for speaker
Party	Candidate	Votes	%
Democratic	John N. Garner (TX 15)	218	50.69
Republican	Bertrand Snell (NY 31)	207	48.14
Republican	George J. Schneider (WI 9)	5	1.17
Total votes		430	100
Votes necessary		216	>50

=== March 1933 ===
An election for speaker took place on March 9, 1933, at the start of the 73rd Congress, following the 1932 elections in which Democrats won a majority of the seats. Henry T. Rainey received a majority of the votes cast and was elected speaker.

1933 election for speaker
Party	Candidate	Votes	%
Democratic	Henry T. Rainey (IL 20)	302	72.25
Republican	Bertrand Snell (NY 31)	110	26.32
Farmer–Labor	Paul J. Kvale (MN at-large)	5	1.19
—	Present	1	0.24
Total votes		418	100
Votes necessary		210	>50

=== January 1935 ===
An election for speaker took place on January 3, 1935, on the opening day of the 74th Congress, (Note: The 74th Congress was the first U.S. Congress to commence on third day of January, as prescribed by the Twentieth Amendment, Section 2, which had been adopted in 1933.) two months after the 1934 elections in which Democrats won a majority of the seats. Joseph Byrns received a majority of the votes cast and was elected speaker.

1935 election for speaker
Party	Candidate	Votes	%
Democratic	Joseph Byrns (TN 5)	317	74.41
Republican	Bertrand Snell (NY 31)	95	22.30
Progressive	George J. Schneider (WI 8)	9	2.11
Republican	William P. Lambertson (KS 1)	2	0.47
—	Present	3	0.71
Total votes		426	100
Votes necessary		214	>50

=== June 1936 ===
Speaker Joseph W. Byrns died suddenly in the early hours of June 4, 1936, during the 74th Congress. Consequently, when the House convened that day, a resolution declaring William B. Bankhead duly elected speaker was adopted by voice vote.

1936 special election for speaker
Party	Candidate	Votes	%
Democratic	William B. Bankhead (AL 7)	Voice	U C

=== January 1937 ===
An election for speaker took place on January 5, 1937, on the opening day of the 75th Congress, two months after the 1936 elections in which Democrats won a majority of the seats. William B. Bankhead received a majority of the votes cast and was re-elected speaker.

1937 election for speaker
Party	Candidate	Votes	%
Democratic	William B. Bankhead (AL 7) (incumbent)	324	76.78
Republican	Bertrand Snell (NY 31)	83	19.67
Progressive	George J. Schneider (WI 8)	10	2.37
Republican	Fred L. Crawford (MI 8)	2	0.47
—	Present	3	0.71
Total votes		421	100
Votes necessary		211	>50

=== January 1939 ===
An election for speaker took place on January 3, 1939, on the opening day of the 76th Congress, two months after the 1938 elections in which Democrats won a majority of the seats. William B. Bankhead received a majority of the votes cast and was re-elected speaker.

1939 election for speaker
Party	Candidate	Votes	%
Democratic	William B. Bankhead (AL 7) (incumbent)	249	59.29
Republican	Joseph W. Martin Jr. (MA 14)	168	40.00
Progressive	Merlin Hull (WI 9)	1	0.24
Progressive	Bernard J. Gehrmann (WI 10)	1	0.24
—	Present	1	0.24
Total votes		420	100
Votes necessary		211	>50

=== September 1940 ===
Speaker William B. Bankhead died on September 15, 1940, during the 76th Congress. Accordingly, when the House convened the next day, a resolution declaring Sam Rayburn duly elected speaker was adopted by voice vote.

1940 special election for speaker
Party	Candidate	Votes	%
Democratic	Sam Rayburn (TX 4)	Voice	U C

=== January 1941 ===
An election for speaker took place on January 3, 1941, on the opening day of the 77th Congress, two months after the 1940 elections in which Democrats won a majority of the seats. Sam Rayburn received a majority of the votes cast and was re-elected speaker.

1941 election for speaker
Party	Candidate	Votes	%
Democratic	Sam Rayburn (TX 4) (incumbent)	247	60.24
Republican	Joseph W. Martin Jr. (MA 14)	159	38.79
Progressive	Merlin Hull (WI 9)	2	0.49
Progressive	Bernard J. Gehrmann (WI 10)	1	0.24
—	Present	1	0.24
Total votes		410	100
Votes necessary		206	>50

=== January 1943 ===
An election for speaker took place on January 6, 1943, on the opening day of the 78th Congress, two months after the 1942 elections in which Democrats won a majority of the seats. Sam Rayburn received a majority of the votes cast and was re-elected speaker.

1943 election for speaker
Party	Candidate	Votes	%
Democratic	Sam Rayburn (TX 4) (incumbent)	217	50.93
Republican	Joseph W. Martin Jr. (MA 14)	206	48.35
Progressive	Merlin Hull (WI 9)	1	0.24
Progressive	Harry Sauthoff (WI 2)	1	0.24
—	Present	1	0.24
Total votes		426	100
Votes necessary		214	>50

=== January 1945 ===
An election for speaker took place on January 3, 1945, on the opening day of the 79th Congress, two months after the 1944 elections in which Democrats won a majority of the seats. Sam Rayburn received a majority of the votes cast and was re-elected speaker.

1945 election for speaker
Party	Candidate	Votes	%
Democratic	Sam Rayburn (TX 4) (incumbent)	224	56.85
Republican	Joseph W. Martin Jr. (MA 14)	168	42.64
—	Present	2	0.51
Total votes		394	100
Votes necessary		198	>50

=== January 1947 ===
An election for speaker took place on January 3, 1947, on the opening day of the 80th Congress, two months after the 1946 elections in which Republicans won a majority of the seats. Joseph W. Martin Jr. received a majority of the votes cast and was elected speaker. This was the first time in 16 years, since 1931, that Republicans controlled the House.

1947 election for speaker
Party	Candidate	Votes	%
Republican	Joseph W. Martin Jr. (MA 14)	244	57.28
Democratic	Sam Rayburn (TX 4) (incumbent)	182	42.72
Total votes		426	100
Votes necessary		214	>50

=== January 1949 ===
An election for speaker took place on January 3, 1949, on the opening day of the 81st Congress, two months after the 1948 elections in which Democrats won a majority of the seats. Former speaker Sam Rayburn received a majority of the votes cast and was elected speaker.

1949 election for speaker
Party	Candidate	Votes	%
Democratic	Sam Rayburn (TX 4)	255	61.30
Republican	Joseph W. Martin Jr. (MA 14) (incumbent)	160	38.46
—	Present	1	0.24
Total votes		416	100
Votes necessary		209	>50

=== January 1951 ===
An election for speaker took place on January 3, 1951, on the opening day of the 82nd Congress, two months after the 1950 elections in which Democrats won a majority of the seats. Sam Rayburn received a majority of the votes cast and was re-elected speaker.

1951 election for speaker
Party	Candidate	Votes	%
Democratic	Sam Rayburn (TX 4) (incumbent)	231	54.23
Republican	Joseph W. Martin Jr. (MA 14)	192	45.07
—	Present	3	0.70
Total votes		426	100
Votes necessary		214	>50

=== January 1953 ===
An election for speaker took place on January 3, 1953, on the opening day of the 83rd Congress, two months after the 1952 elections in which Republicans won a majority of the seats. Former speaker Joseph W. Martin Jr. received a majority of the votes cast and was elected speaker.

1953 election for speaker
Party	Candidate	Votes	%
Republican	Joseph W. Martin Jr. (MA 14)	220	51.89
Democratic	Sam Rayburn (TX 4) (incumbent)	201	47.41
—	Present	3	0.70
Total votes		424	100
Votes necessary		213	>50

=== January 1955 ===
An election for speaker took place on January 5, 1955, on the opening day of the 84th Congress, two months after the 1954 elections in which Democrats won a majority of the seats. Former speaker Sam Rayburn received a majority of the votes cast and was elected speaker, becoming the first member since Henry Clay in the 1820s to have a third stint as speaker.

1955 election for speaker
Party	Candidate	Votes	%
Democratic	Sam Rayburn (TX 4)	228	53.52
Republican	Joseph W. Martin Jr. (MA 14) (incumbent)	198	46.48
Total votes		426	100
Votes necessary		214	>50

=== January 1957 ===
An election for speaker took place on January 3, 1957, on the opening day of the 85th Congress, two months after the 1956 elections in which Democrats won a majority of the seats. Sam Rayburn received a majority of the votes cast and was re-elected speaker.

1957 election for speaker
Party	Candidate	Votes	%
Democratic	Sam Rayburn (TX 4) (incumbent)	227	53.04
Republican	Joseph W. Martin Jr. (MA 14)	199	46.49
—	Present	2	0.47
Total votes		428	100
Votes necessary		215	>50

=== January 1959 ===
An election for speaker took place on January 7, 1959, on the opening day of the 86th Congress, two months after the 1958 elections in which Democrats won a majority of the seats. Sam Rayburn received a majority of the votes cast and was re-elected speaker.

1959 election for speaker
Party	Candidate	Votes	%
Democratic	Sam Rayburn (TX 4) (incumbent)	281	65.19
Republican	Charles A. Halleck (IN 2)	148	34.35
—	Present	2	0.46
Total votes		431	100
Votes necessary		216	>50

=== January 1961 ===
An election for speaker took place on January 3, 1961, on the opening day of the 87th Congress, two months after the 1960 elections in which Democrats won a majority of the seats. Sam Rayburn received a majority of the votes cast and was re-elected speaker.

1961 election for speaker
Party	Candidate	Votes	%
Democratic	Sam Rayburn (TX 4) (incumbent)	258	60.00
Republican	Charles A. Halleck (IN 2)	170	39.54
—	Present	2	0.46
Total votes		430	100
Votes necessary		216	>50

=== January 1962 ===
Sam Rayburn died on November 16, 1961, between the first and second sessions of 87th Congress. Consequently, an intra-term election for a new speaker was held on January 10, 1962, when Congress reconvened. John W. McCormack received a majority of the votes cast and was elected speaker.

1962 special election for speaker
Party	Candidate	Votes	%
Democratic	John W. McCormack (MA 9)	248	59.90
Republican	Charles A. Halleck (IN 2)	166	40.10
Total votes		414	100
Votes necessary		208	>50

=== January 1963 ===
An election for speaker took place on January 9, 1963, on the opening day of the 88th Congress, two months after the 1962 elections in which Democrats won a majority of the seats. John W. McCormack received a majority of the votes cast and was re-elected speaker.

1963 election for speaker
Party	Candidate	Votes	%
Democratic	John W. McCormack (MA 9) (incumbent)	256	59.12
Republican	Charles A. Halleck (IN 2)	175	40.42
—	Present	2	0.46
Total votes		433	100
Votes necessary		217	>50

=== January 1965 ===
An election for speaker took place on January 4, 1965, on the opening day of the 89th Congress, two months after the 1964 elections in which Democrats won a majority of the seats. John W. McCormack received a majority of the votes cast and was re-elected speaker.

1965 election for speaker
Party	Candidate	Votes	%
Democratic	John W. McCormack (MA 9) (incumbent)	289	67.52
Republican	Gerald Ford (MI 5)	139	32.48
Total votes		428	100
Votes necessary		215	>50

=== January 1967 ===
An election for speaker took place on January 10, 1967, on the opening day of the 90th Congress, two months after the 1966 elections in which Democrats won a majority of the seats. John W. McCormack received a majority of the votes cast and was re-elected speaker.

1967 election for speaker
Party	Candidate	Votes	%
Democratic	John W. McCormack (MA 9) (incumbent)	246	56.94
Republican	Gerald Ford (MI 5)	186	43.06
Total votes		432	100
Votes necessary		217	>50

=== January 1969 ===
An election for speaker took place on January 3, 1969, on the opening day of the 91st Congress, two months after the 1968 elections in which Democrats won a majority of the seats. John W. McCormack received a majority of the votes cast and was re-elected speaker.

1969 election for speaker
Party	Candidate	Votes	%
Democratic	John W. McCormack (MA 9) (incumbent)	241	56.31
Republican	Gerald Ford (MI 5)	187	43.69
Total votes		428	100
Votes necessary		215	>50

=== January 1971 ===
An election for speaker took place on January 21, 1971, on the opening day of the 92nd Congress, two months after the 1970 elections in which Democrats won a majority of the seats. Carl Albert received a majority of the votes cast and was elected speaker.

1971 election for speaker
Party	Candidate	Votes	%
Democratic	Carl Albert (OK 3)	250	58.68
Republican	Gerald Ford (MI 5)	176	41.32
Total votes		426	100
Votes necessary		214	>50

=== January 1973 ===
An election for speaker took place on January 3, 1973, on the opening day of the 93rd Congress, two months after the 1972 elections in which Democrats won a majority of the seats. Carl Albert received a majority of the votes cast and was re-elected speaker.

1973 election for speaker
Party	Candidate	Votes	%
Democratic	Carl Albert (OK 3) (incumbent)	236	55.66
Republican	Gerald Ford (MI 5)	188	44.34
Total votes		424	100
Votes necessary		213	>50

=== January 1975 ===
An election for speaker took place on January 14, 1975, on the opening day of the 94th Congress, two months after the 1974 elections in which Democrats won a majority of the seats. Carl Albert received a majority of the votes cast and was re-elected speaker.

1975 election for speaker
Party	Candidate	Votes	%
Democratic	Carl Albert (OK 3) (incumbent)	287	66.43
Republican	John J. Rhodes (AZ 1)	143	33.11
—	Present	2	0.46
Total votes		432	100
Votes necessary		217	>50

=== January 1977 ===
An election for speaker took place on January 4, 1977, on the opening day of the 95th Congress, two months after the 1976 elections in which Democrats won a majority of the seats. Tip O'Neill received a majority of the votes cast and was elected speaker.

1977 election for speaker
Party	Candidate	Votes	%
Democratic	Tip O'Neill (MA 8)	290	66.82
Republican	John J. Rhodes (AZ 1)	142	32.72
—	Present	2	0.46
Total votes		434	100
Votes necessary		218	>50

=== January 1979 ===
An election for speaker took place on January 15, 1979, on the opening day of the 96th Congress, two months after the 1978 elections in which Democrats won a majority of the seats. Tip O'Neill received a majority of the votes cast and was re-elected speaker.

1979 election for speaker
Party	Candidate	Votes	%
Democratic	Tip O'Neill (MA 8) (incumbent)	268	63.51
Republican	John J. Rhodes (AZ 1)	152	36.02
—	Present	2	0.47
Total votes		422	112
Votes necessary		212	>50

=== January 1981 ===
An election for speaker took place on January 5, 1981, on the opening day of the 97th Congress, two months after the 1980 elections in which Democrats won a majority of the seats. Tip O'Neill received a majority of the votes cast and was re-elected speaker.

1981 election for speaker
Party	Candidate	Votes	%
Democratic	Tip O'Neill (MA 8) (incumbent)	234	55.98
Republican	Robert H. Michel (IL 18)	182	43.54
—	Present	2	0.48
Total votes		419	100
Votes necessary		210	>50

=== January 1983 ===
An election for speaker took place on January 3, 1983, on the opening day of the 98th Congress, two months after the 1982 elections in which Democrats won a majority of the seats. Tip O'Neill received a majority of the votes cast and was re-elected speaker.

1983 election for speaker
Party	Candidate	Votes	%
Democratic	Tip O'Neill (MA 8) (incumbent)	260	62.35
Republican	Robert H. Michel (IL 18)	155	37.17
—	Present	2	0.48
Total votes		417	100
Votes necessary		209	>50

=== January 1985 ===
An election for speaker took place on January 3, 1985, on the opening day of the 99th Congress, two months after the 1984 elections in which Democrats won a majority of the seats. Tip O'Neill received a majority of the votes cast and was re-elected speaker.

1985 election for speaker
Party	Candidate	Votes	%
Democratic	Tip O'Neill (MA 8) (incumbent)	247	58.11
Republican	Robert H. Michel (IL 18)	175	41.18
—	Present	3	0.71
Total votes		425	100
Votes necessary		213	>50

=== January 1987 ===
An election for speaker took place on January 6, 1987, on the opening day of the 100th Congress, two months after the 1986 elections in which Democrats won a majority of the seats. Jim Wright received a majority of the votes cast and was elected speaker.

1987 election for speaker
Party	Candidate	Votes	%
Democratic	Jim Wright (TX 12)	254	59.21
Republican	Robert H. Michel (IL 18)	173	40.33
—	Present	2	0.46
Total votes		429	100
Votes necessary		215	>50

=== January 1989 ===
An election for speaker took place on January 3, 1989, on the opening day of the 101st Congress, two months after the 1988 elections in which Democrats won a majority of the seats. Jim Wright received a majority of the votes cast and was re-elected speaker.

1989 election for speaker
Party	Candidate	Votes	%
Democratic	Jim Wright (TX 12) (incumbent)	253	59.53
Republican	Robert H. Michel (IL 18)	170	40.00
—	Present	2	0.47
Total votes		425	100
Votes necessary		213	>50

=== June 1989 ===
In June 1989, Jim Wright resigned as speaker of the House and from Congress amid a House Ethics Committee investigation into his financial dealings. Consequently, an intra-term election for a new speaker was held on June 6, 1989, during the 101st Congress. Tom Foley received a majority of the votes cast and was elected speaker.

1989 special election for speaker
Party	Candidate	Votes	%
Democratic	Tom Foley (WA 5)	251	60.19
Republican	Robert H. Michel (IL 18)	164	39.33
—	Present	2	0.48
Total votes		417	100
Votes necessary		209	>50

=== January 1991 ===
An election for speaker took place on January 3, 1991, on the opening day of the 102nd Congress, two months after the 1990 elections in which Democrats won a majority of the seats. Tom Foley received a majority of the votes cast and was re-elected speaker.

1991 election for speaker
Party	Candidate	Votes	%
Democratic	Tom Foley (WA 5) (incumbent)	262	61.07
Republican	Robert H. Michel (IL 18)	165	38.47
—	Present	2	0.46
Total votes		429	100
Votes necessary		215	>50

=== January 1993 ===
An election for speaker took place on January 5, 1993, on the opening day of the 103rd Congress, two months after the 1992 elections in which Democrats won a majority of the seats. Tom Foley received a majority of the votes cast and was re-elected speaker.

1993 election for speaker
Party	Candidate	Votes	%
Democratic	Tom Foley (WA 5) (incumbent)	255	59.16
Republican	Robert H. Michel (IL 18)	174	40.38
—	Present	2	0.46
Total votes		431	100
Votes necessary		216	>50

=== January 1995 ===
An election for speaker took place on January 4, 1995, on the opening day of the 104th Congress, two months after the 1994 elections in which Republicans won a majority of the seats. Newt Gingrich received a majority of the votes cast and was elected speaker. This was the first time in 40 years, since 1955, that Republicans controlled the House.

1995 election for speaker
Party	Candidate	Votes	%
Republican	Newt Gingrich (GA 6)	228	52.54
Democratic	Dick Gephardt (MO 3)	202	46.55
—	Present	4	0.91
Total votes		434	100
Votes necessary		218	>50

=== January 1997 ===
An election for speaker took place on January 7, 1997, on the opening day of the 105th Congress, two months after the 1996 elections in which Republicans won a majority of the seats. Newt Gingrich received a majority of the votes cast and was re-elected speaker. A number of Republicans did not support Gingrich's bid for a second term, and a few of them voted for other people. It was the first time in half a century in which votes were cast for someone besides the Democratic or Republican nominee.

1997 election for speaker
Party	Candidate	Votes	%
Republican	Newt Gingrich (GA 6) (incumbent)	216	50.83
Democratic	Dick Gephardt (MO 3)	205	48.24
Republican	Jim Leach (IA 1)	2	0.47
Republican	Robert Michel (Note: Robert Michel and Robert Walker each received one vote in the 1997 speaker election, even though neither was a member of the House at the time.)	1	0.23
Republican	Robert Walker	1	0.23
Total votes		425	100
Votes necessary		213	>50

=== January 1999 ===
An election for speaker took place on January 6, 1999, on the opening day of the 106th Congress, two months after the 1998 elections in which Republicans won a majority of the seats. Dennis Hastert received a majority of the votes cast and was elected speaker.

1999 election for speaker
Party	Candidate	Votes	%
Republican	Dennis Hastert (IL 14)	222	52.00
Democratic	Dick Gephardt (MO 3)	205	48.00
Total votes		427	100
Votes necessary		214	>50

== Elections since 2001 ==
=== January 2001 ===
An election for speaker took place on January 3, 2001, on the opening day of the 107th Congress, two months after the 2000 elections in which Republicans won a majority of the seats. Dennis Hastert received a majority of the votes cast and was re-elected speaker.

2001 election for speaker
Party	Candidate	Votes	%
Republican	Dennis Hastert (IL 14) (incumbent)	222	51.50
Democratic	Dick Gephardt (MO 3)	206	47.80
Democratic	John Murtha (PA 12)	1	0.23
—	Present	2	0.47
Total votes		431	100
Votes necessary		216	>50

=== January 2003 ===
An election for speaker took place on January 7, 2003, on the opening day of the 108th Congress, two months after the 2002 elections in which Republicans won a majority of the seats. Dennis Hastert received a majority of the votes cast and was re-elected speaker.

2003 election for speaker
Party	Candidate	Votes	%
Republican	Dennis Hastert (IL 14) (incumbent)	228	52.53
Democratic	Nancy Pelosi (CA 8)	201	46.31
Democratic	John Murtha (PA 12)	1	0.23
—	Present	4	0.93
Total votes		434	100
Votes necessary		218	>50

=== January 2005 ===
An election for speaker took place on January 4, 2005, on the opening day of the 109th Congress, two months after the 2004 elections in which Republicans won a majority of the seats. Dennis Hastert received a majority of the votes cast and was re-elected speaker.

2005 election for speaker
Party	Candidate	Votes	%
Republican	Dennis Hastert (IL 14) (incumbent)	226	52.92
Democratic	Nancy Pelosi (CA 8)	199	46.60
Democratic	John Murtha (PA 12)	1	0.24
—	Present	1	0.24
Total votes		427	100
Votes necessary		214	>50

=== January 2007 ===
An election for speaker took place on January 4, 2007, on the opening day of the 110th Congress, two months after the 2006 elections in which Democrats won a majority of the seats. Nancy Pelosi received a majority of the votes cast and was elected speaker, becoming the first woman speaker of the House in U.S. history. This was the first time in 12 years, since 1995, that the Democrats controlled the House.

2007 election for speaker
Party	Candidate	Votes	%
Democratic	Nancy Pelosi (CA 8)	233	53.56
Republican	John Boehner (OH 8)	202	46.44
Total votes		435	100
Votes necessary		218	>50

=== January 2009 ===
An election for speaker took place on January 6, 2009, on the opening day of the 111th Congress, two months after the 2008 elections in which Democrats won a majority of the seats. Nancy Pelosi received a majority of the votes cast and was re-elected speaker.

2009 election for speaker
Party	Candidate	Votes	%
Democratic	Nancy Pelosi (CA 8) (incumbent)	255	59.44
Republican	John Boehner (OH 8)	174	40.56
Total votes		429	100
Votes necessary		215	>50

=== January 2011 ===
An election for speaker took place on January 5, 2011, at the start of the 112th Congress, two months after the 2010 elections in which Republicans won a majority of the seats. John Boehner received a majority of the votes cast and was elected speaker of the House. Frustrated by widespread election losses, several Blue Dog Democrats, led by Heath Shuler, refused to support Democratic Caucus nominee Nancy Pelosi.

2011 election for speaker
Party	Candidate	Votes	%
Republican	John Boehner (OH 8)	241	55.88
Democratic	Nancy Pelosi (CA 8) (incumbent)	173	39.96
Democratic	Heath Shuler (NC 11)	11	2.53
Democratic	John Lewis (GA 5)	2	0.48
Democratic	Dennis Cardoza (CA 18)	1	0.23
Democratic	Jim Costa (CA 20)	1	0.23
Democratic	Jim Cooper (TN 5)	1	0.23
Democratic	Steny Hoyer (MD 5)	1	0.23
Democratic	Marcy Kaptur (OH 9)	1	0.23
Total votes		432	100
Votes necessary		217	>50

=== January 2013 ===
An election for speaker took place on January 3, 2013, at the start of the 113th Congress, two months after the 2012 elections in which Republicans won a majority of the seats. John Boehner received a majority of the votes cast, despite the defections of several members from his own party, and was re-elected speaker.

2013 election for speaker
Party	Candidate	Votes	%
Republican	John Boehner (OH 8) (incumbent)	220	51.64
Democratic	Nancy Pelosi (CA 12)	192	45.04
Republican	Eric Cantor (VA 7)	3	0.70
Democratic	Jim Cooper (TN 5)	2	0.47
Republican	Allen West (Note: Allen West, Colin Powell and David M. Walker each received votes in the 2013 speaker election, even though none of them were a member of the House at the time.)	2	0.47
Republican	Justin Amash (MI 3)	1	0.24
Democratic	John Dingell (MI 12)	1	0.24
Republican	Jim Jordan (OH 4)	1	0.24
Republican	Raúl Labrador (ID 1)	1	0.24
Democratic	John Lewis (GA 5)	1	0.24
Republican	Colin Powell	1	0.24
Republican	David Walker	1	0.24
Total votes		426	100
Votes necessary		214	>50

=== January 2015 ===
An election for speaker took place on January 6, 2015, at the start of the 114th Congress, two months after the 2014 elections in which Republicans won a majority of the seats. John Boehner received a majority of the votes cast and was re-elected speaker, even though Freedom Caucus Republicans chose not to vote for him.

2015 election for speaker
Party	Candidate	Votes	%
Republican	John Boehner (OH 8) (incumbent)	216	52.95
Democratic	Nancy Pelosi (CA 12)	164	40.20
Republican	Dan Webster (FL 10)	12	2.95
Republican	Louie Gohmert (TX 1)	3	0.74
Republican	Ted Yoho (FL 3)	2	2.50
Republican	Jim Jordan (OH 4)	2	0.50
Republican	Jeff Duncan (SC 3)	1	0.24
Republican	Rand Paul (Note: Rand Paul, Colin Powell and Jeff Sessions each received one vote in the January 2015 speaker election, even though none of them were a member of the House at the time.)	1	0.24
Republican	Colin Powell	1	0.24
Republican	Trey Gowdy (SC 4)	1	0.24
Republican	Kevin McCarthy (CA 23)	1	0.24
Democratic	Jim Cooper (TN 5)	1	0.24
Democratic	Peter DeFazio (OR 4)	1	0.24
Republican	Jeff Sessions	1	0.24
Democratic	John Lewis (GA 5)	1	0.24
Total votes		408	100
Votes necessary		205	>50

=== October 2015 ===
On September 25, 2015, John Boehner formally announced his intention to resign from the speakership and the House. Consequently, an intra-term election for a new speaker was held on October 29, 2015, during the 114th Congress. Paul Ryan received a majority of the votes cast and was elected speaker.

2015 special election for speaker
Party	Candidate	Votes	%
Republican	Paul Ryan (WI 1)	236	54.63
Democratic	Nancy Pelosi (CA 12)	184	42.60
Republican	Dan Webster (FL 10)	9	2.08
Democratic	Jim Cooper (TN 5)	1	0.23
Democratic	John Lewis (GA 5)	1	0.23
Republican	Colin Powell (Note: Colin Powell received one vote in the October 2015 speaker election, even though he was not a member of the House at the time.)	1	0.23
Total votes		432	100
Votes necessary		217	>50

=== January 2017 ===
An election for speaker took place on January 3, 2017, on the opening day of the 115th Congress, two months after the 2016 elections in which Republicans won a majority of the seats. Paul Ryan received a majority of the votes cast and was re-elected speaker.

2017 election for speaker
Party	Candidate	Votes	%
Republican	Paul Ryan (WI 1) (incumbent)	239	55.19
Democratic	Nancy Pelosi (CA 12)	189	43.65
Democratic	Tim Ryan (OH 13)	2	0.47
Democratic	Jim Cooper (TN 5)	1	0.23
Democratic	John Lewis (GA 5)	1	0.23
Republican	Dan Webster (FL 10)	1	0.23
Total votes		433	100
Votes necessary		217	>50

=== January 2019 ===
An election for speaker took place on January 3, 2019, on the opening day of the 116th Congress, two months after the 2018 elections in which Democrats won a majority of the seats. Former speaker Nancy Pelosi received a majority of the votes cast and was elected speaker, even though several Democrats did not vote for her. With this victory, she became the first person since Sam Rayburn in the 1950s to return to the speakership after losing it.

2019 election for speaker
Party	Candidate	Votes	%
Democratic	Nancy Pelosi (CA 12)	220	51.17
Republican	Kevin McCarthy (CA 23)	192	44.66
Republican	Jim Jordan (OH 4)	5	1.16
Democratic	Cheri Bustos (IL 17)	4	0.93
Democratic	Tammy Duckworth (Note: Tammy Duckworth, Stacey Abrams and Joe Biden each received votes in the 2019 speaker election, even though none of them were a member of the House at the time.)	2	0.47
Democratic	Stacey Abrams	1	0.23
Democratic	Joe Biden	1	0.23
Democratic	Marcia Fudge (OH 11)	1	0.23
Democratic	Joe Kennedy III (MA 4)	1	0.23
Democratic	John Lewis (GA 5)	1	0.23
Republican	Thomas Massie (KY 4)	1	0.23
Democratic	Stephanie Murphy (FL 7)	1	0.23
Total votes		430	100
Votes necessary		216	>50

=== January 2021 ===
An election for speaker took place on January 3, 2021, at the start of the 117th Congress, two months after the 2020 elections in which Democrats won a slim majority of the seats. In a break with tradition due to the COVID-19 pandemic, all House members-elect did not gather together in the chamber to vote and record their presence, but rather, were summoned to the chambers in seven groups of about 72 persons. Nancy Pelosi received a majority of the votes cast and was re-elected speaker.

2021 election for speaker
Party	Candidate	Votes	%
Democratic	Nancy Pelosi (CA 12) (incumbent)	216	50.59
Republican	Kevin McCarthy (CA 23)	209	48.95
Democratic	Hakeem Jeffries (NY 8)	1 (Note: Conor Lamb voted for Hakeem Jeffries)	0.23
Democratic	Tammy Duckworth (Note: Tammy Duckworth received a vote in the 2021 speaker election, even though she was not a member of the House.)	1 (Note: Jared Golden voted for Tammy Duckworth)	0.23
Total votes		427	100
Votes necessary		214	>50

=== January 2023 ===
An election for speaker was held January 3–7, 2023, at the start of the 118th Congress, two months after the 2022 elections in which Republicans gained the House with a slim majority. Kevin McCarthy received a majority of the votes cast in the 15th ballot and was elected speaker. Due to division within the House Republican Conference, no candidate received a majority of the votes on the first ballot, necessitating what became the longest multiple-ballot speaker election since before the Civil War. McCarthy's victory came when the remaining six anti-McCarthy holdouts voted "present" on the 15th ballot, thus reducing the threshold of votes needed for a majority to 215 members. House Democratic Caucus members voted unanimously for Hakeem Jeffries; this was the first time since 2009 that all present Democratic members voted for the caucus's speaker nominee.

2023 election for speaker
January 3, 2023 – 1st ballot
Party	Candidate	Votes	%
Democratic	Hakeem Jeffries (NY 8)	212	48.85
Republican	Kevin McCarthy (CA 20)	203	46.78
Republican	Andy Biggs (AZ 5)	10	2.30
Republican	Jim Jordan (OH 4)	6	1.38
Republican	Jim Banks (IN 3)	1	0.23
Republican	Byron Donalds (FL 19)	1	0.23
Republican	Lee Zeldin (Note: Lee Zeldin received a vote on the 1st ballot of the January 2023 speaker election, even though he was not a member of the House.)	1	0.23
Total votes:		434	100
Votes necessary:		218	>50
January 7, 2023 – 15th ballot
Party	Candidate	Votes	%
Republican	Kevin McCarthy (CA 20)	216	50.47
Democratic	Hakeem Jeffries (NY 8)	212	49.53
Total votes:		428	100
Votes necessary:		215	>50

=== October 2023 ===
On October 3, 2023, Kevin McCarthy was removed from the speakership through a motion to vacate. Consequently, an intra-term election for a new speaker was held on October 17–25, during the 118th Congress. Mike Johnson received a majority of the votes cast in the fourth ballot and was elected speaker. He was the fourth person the Republican Conference selected as its nominee for House speaker after Jim Jordan, Steve Scalise, and Tom Emmer were unable to unify conference members around their candidacies.

2023 special election for speaker
October 17, 2023 – 1st ballot
Party	Candidate	Votes	%
Democratic	Hakeem Jeffries (NY 8)	212	49.07
Republican	Jim Jordan (OH 4)	200	46.30
Republican	Steve Scalise (LA 1)	7	1.62
Republican	Kevin McCarthy (CA 20)	6	1.39
Republican	Lee Zeldin (Note: Lee Zeldin received votes on the 1st ballot of the October 2023 speaker election, even though he was not a member of the House.)	3	0.69
Republican	Tom Cole (OK 4)	1	0.23
Republican	Tom Emmer (MN 6)	1	0.23
Republican	Mike Garcia (CA 27)	1	0.23
Republican	Thomas Massie (KY 4)	1	0.23
Total votes:		432	100
Votes necessary:		217	>50
October 25, 2023 – 4th ballot
Party	Candidate	Votes	%
Republican	Mike Johnson (LA 4)	220	51.28
Democratic	Hakeem Jeffries (NY 8)	209	48.72
Total votes:		429	100
Votes necessary:		215	>50

=== January 2025 ===
An election for speaker was held January 3, 2025, at the start of the 119th Congress, two months after the 2024 elections in which Republicans retained the House with a slim majority. Mike Johnson received a majority of the votes cast on the first ballot and was re-elected speaker, but only after two of the three Republicans who voted against Johnson in the roll call vote switched their votes.

2025 election for speaker (Note: Table shows first ballot vote tally after vote shifts; votes before shifts were: Mike Johnson – 216, Hakeem Jeffries – 215, Tom Emmer – 1, Byron Donalds – 1, and Jim Jordan – 1. (total votes: 434 / votes necessary: 218))
Party	Candidate	Votes	%
Republican	Mike Johnson (LA 4) (incumbent)	218	50.23
Democratic	Hakeem Jeffries (NY 8)	215	49.54
Republican	Tom Emmer (MN 6)	1	0.23
Total votes		434	100
Votes necessary		218	>50

=== January 2027 ===
An election for speaker will be held on January 3, 2027, at the start of the 120th Congress, two months after the 2026 elections in which Democrats won a wide majority of the seats.
