= John Leganski =

John G. Leganski is an American lobbyist, former political staffer, and author. He is best known for his Capitol Hill career working for former Speaker of the House Kevin McCarthy.

== Early life and education ==
Leganski grew up in Darien, Illinois. He earned his bachelor's degree from Stanford University in 2013 where he was a member of the Sigma Chi fraternity.

== Career ==
From April to June 2011, Leganski interned in the office of the House Republican Whip, then held by Representative Kevin McCarthy. He was initially unpaid. After graduating from Stanford, Leganski returned to the Whip's office as a staff assistant. He held various roles working for McCarthy between 2013 and 2023, ultimately serving as his deputy chief of staff and managing floor operations from January to October 2023, including during the January 2023 speaker's race and the Fiscal Responsibility Act of 2023.

Leganski left Congress when McCarthy resigned. In January 2024, Leganski became a lobbyist with Harbinger Strategies.

In June 2026, Leganski published a memoir, Glory, Grief, and the Gavel: An Inside Guide to Running for Speaker of the House. The book details his time working for McCarthy, sharing stories from McCarthy's campaigns to be Speaker of the U.S. House of Representatives. The book includes detailed accounts of McCarthy's campaign for the speakership, including conversations between President Donald Trump and numerous Members of Congress, with Matt Gaetz what Roll Call dubbed the "chief antagonist".
