= 2026 Senate Democratic Caucus leadership election =

- December 1, 2026

55 members of the Senate Democratic Caucus in the 120th Congress (Note: While the 120th Congress will have 56 Democratic senators, outgoing senator Amy Klobuchar is ineligible to vote after being elected governor of Minnesota.) 28 votes needed to win
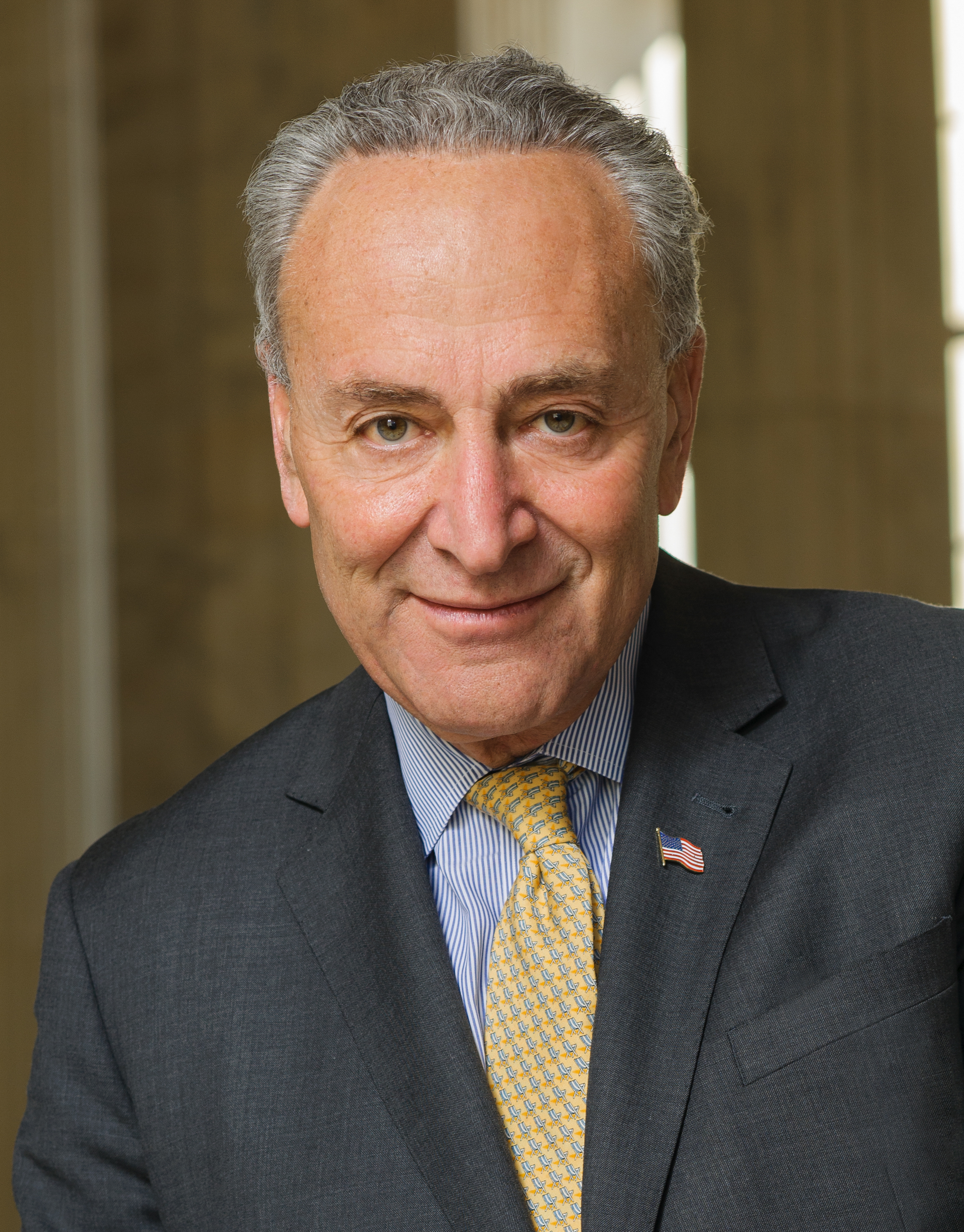

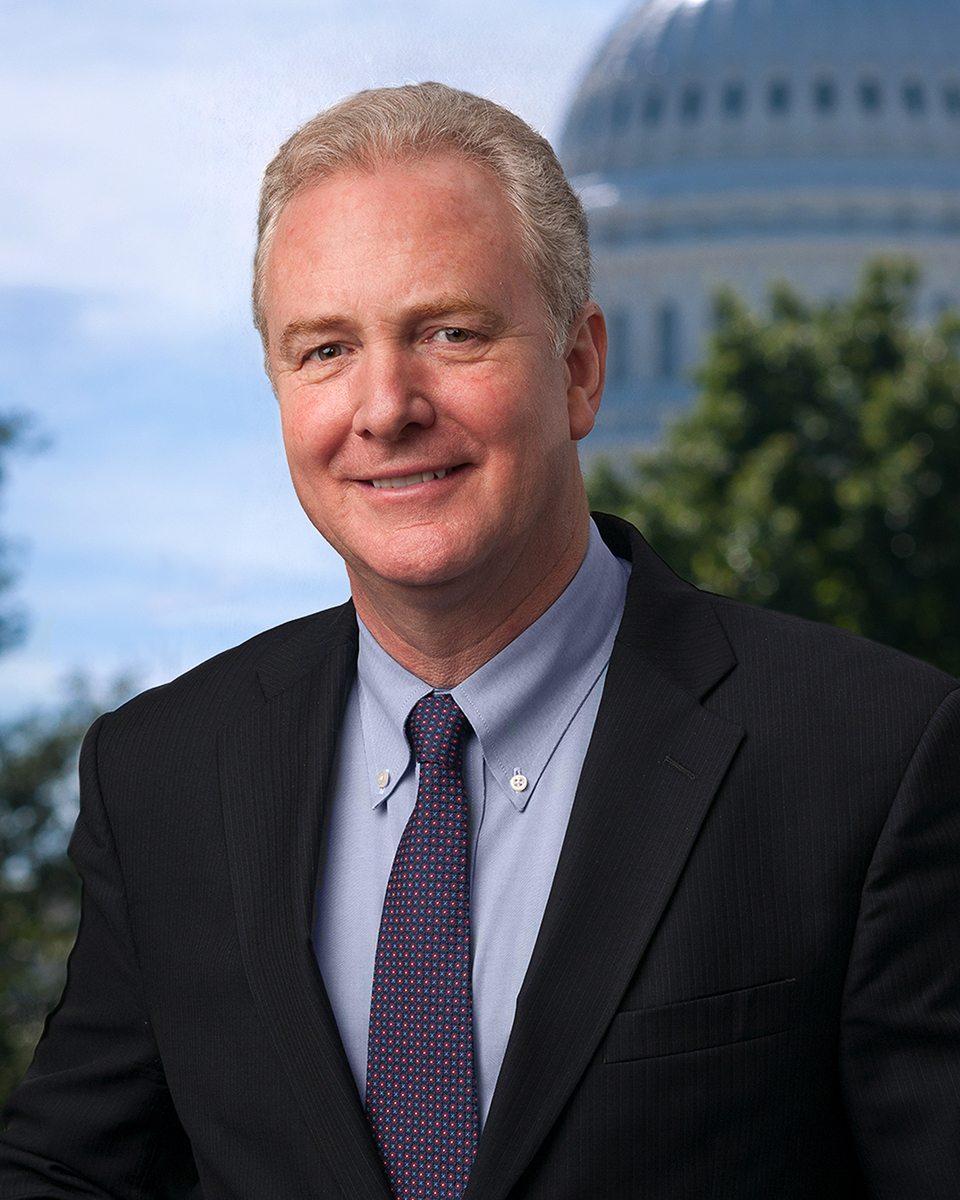
Candidate	Chuck Schumer	Chris Van Hollen
Seat	New York	Maryland
Incumbent Leader
Chuck Schumer

A leadership election is scheduled to be held on December 1, 2026 to elect the leader of the Senate Democratic Caucus in the United States Senate for the 120th Congress. As the Democratic Party won a majority in the 2026 United States Senate elections, the winner of this election will serve as the Senate Majority Leader.

A Senate Democratic Leader election has not been contested since 1994. A sitting Senate Democratic leader has not been challenged for their position since 1984.

== Background ==
New York senator Chuck Schumer has led the Senate Democratic Caucus since 2017. During that time, he served as Senate minority leader from 2017 to 2021, and as Senate majority leader from 2021 to 2025. Schumer resumed the role of minority leader following the 2024 United States Senate elections. According to the Associated Press, Schumer "has directly or indirectly overseen his party's Senate campaign arm in almost every election cycle over the last 20 years" and was again viewed as leading the campaign in 2026. Ahead of the 2026 Senate elections, he was not expected to be challenged as leader unless Democrats experienced unexpected losses .

On March 12, 2025, Schumer announced his opposition to the House-passed continuing resolution (CR) to fund the 2025 United States federal budget until September 30, 2025. The next day, he reversed his position. This drew the ire of many House Democrats, including Alexandria Ocasio-Cortez and Nancy Pelosi. He ultimately voted to advance the budget proposal, along with nine other Democrats. After the vote, Schumer faced pressure to step down as Senate leader, but he said he had no intention to do so. In November, following the end of the 2025 federal government shutdown, saw renewed calls for Schumer to step down from progressive Democrats, many of whom considered the shutdown to have ended without Senate Democrats extracting meaningful budgetary concessions from Republicans, a fact for which Schumer faced criticism. The end of the shutdown additionally saw the name of Senator Chris Van Hollen of Maryland begin being floated in some Democratic circles as a potential progressive alternative to Schumer.

In the 2026 midterms, Senate Democrats won a larger-than-expected victory, putting Schumer in a strong position to keep support from his colleagues. Politico reported that "senators and aides across the caucus agree" that the event of Democrats winning the majority would position Schumer as "a shoo-in to return as top leader." The election was viewed as a resounding success for Schumer with The Free Press declaring that "Chuck Schumer won the Senate" and Politico reporting that "Chuck Schumer just won a huge majority."

Van Hollen had previously gained national attention that year for traveling to El Salvador to advocate for the return of deported Maryland resident Kilmar Abrego Garcia. Shortly after the 2026 midterm elections, Michigan Senator-elect Abdul El-Sayed stated during a November 5 interview with CNN anchor Kate Bolduan that Van Hollen would be an "amazing" majority leader. El-Sayed had previously suggested Van Hollen for majority leader earlier in May. The same day, The Hill reported that "a source close to Van Hollen" stated that the senator was "not planning" to challenge Schumer. On November 9, however, Van Hollen stated that he had not "shut the door" on seeking the role. On November 12, Van Hollen announced that he would run against Schumer in the election for majority leader.

Senators both supporting and opposing Schumer as Senate leader have cited the results of the 2026 midterms to justify their positions. Senators opposing Schumer, such as Bernie Sanders and Elissa Slotkin, have characterized the results as representing a general desire for change among voters. Senators backing Schumer, such as Kirsten Gillibrand, Angus King, and Sheldon Whitehouse, have cited Schumer's recruitment of strong Senate candidates in competitive races, along with his involvement in fundraising, as playing a major role in Democrats' electoral victory.

As of November 2026, Schumer holds a substantial advantage over Van Hollen in early public expressions of support from fellow senators. Further, Schumer has claimed to have enough private commitments of support to win reelection. Senator Chris Coons, who had not endorsed either candidate, described Van Hollen's chances of winning as "remote".

== Candidates ==
Candidate	State	Other Senate roles	Ref.
Chuck Schumer	New York (since 1999)	Senate Democratic Leader (2017–present); Chair of the Senate Democratic Policy Committee (2011–2017); Vice Chair of the Senate Democratic Caucus (2007–2017); Chair of the Democratic Senatorial Campaign Committee (2005–2009)	
Chris Van Hollen	Maryland (since 2017)	Chair of the Democratic Senatorial Campaign Committee (2017–2019)	

== Whip count ==
Whip count: Endorsed Schumer; Endorsed Van Hollen; Endorsed against Schumer; Uncommitted or no endorsement

Chuck Schumer (16 – not including himself)

U.S. senators

- Angela Alsobrooks, MD (2025–present)
- Tammy Baldwin, WI (2013–present)
- Richard Blumenthal, CT (2011–present)
- Catherine Cortez Masto, NV (2017–present)
- John Fetterman, PA (2023–present)
- Ruben Gallego, AZ (2025–present)
- Kirsten Gillibrand, NY (2009–present)
- Mazie Hirono, HI (2013–present)
- Tim Kaine, VA (2013–present)
- Mark Kelly, AZ (2020–present)
- Angus King, ME (2013–present) (Independent Democrat)
- Jack Reed, RI (1997–present)
- Jacky Rosen, NV (2019–present)
- Brian Schatz, HI (2012–present)
- Sheldon Whitehouse, RI (2007–present)

U.S. senators-elect

- Sherrod Brown, OH
Chris Van Hollen (5 – not including himself)

U.S. senators

- Jeff Merkley, OR (2009–present)
- Bernie Sanders, VT (2007–present) and Chair of Outreach (Independent Democrat)
- Elissa Slotkin, MI (2025-present)

U.S. senators-elect

- Abdul El-Sayed, MI
- Peggy Flanagan, MN
Uncommitted (15)

U.S. senators

- Maria Cantwell, WA (2001–present)
- Martin Heinrich, NM (2013–present)
- John Hickenlooper, CO (2021–present)
- Jon Ossoff, GA (2021–present)
- Alex Padilla, CA (2021–present)
- Mark Warner, VA (2009–present)
- Raphael Warnock, GA (2021–present)
- Elizabeth Warren, MA (2013–present)
- Ron Wyden, OR (1996–present)

U.S. senators-elect

- Annie Andrews, SC
- Scott Colom, MS
- Chris Pappas, NH
- Juliana Stratton, IL
- James Talarico, TX
- Josh Turek, IA
Against Schumer (2)

U.S. senators-elect

- Adam Hamilton, KS
- Troy Jackson, ME
Unknown support (15)

U.S. senators

- Michael Bennet, CO (2009–present)
- Lisa Blunt Rochester, DE (2025–present)
- Cory Booker, NJ (2013–present)
- Chris Coons, DE (2010–present)
- Tammy Duckworth, IL (2017–present)
- Maggie Hassan, NH (2017–present)
- Andy Kim, NJ (2024–present)
- Ben Ray Lujan, NM (2021–present)
- Ed Markey, MA (2013–present)
- Chris Murphy, CT (2013–present)
- Patty Murray, WA (1993–present)
- Adam Schiff, CA (2024–present)
- Peter Welch, VT (2023–present)

U.S. senators-elect

- Roy Cooper, NC
- Mary Peltola, AK

== Other endorsements ==
Chuck Schumer

Organizations

- Jewish Democratic Council of America
Chris Van Hollen

Outgoing senators (not eligible to vote)

- Tina Smith, MN (2018–present)

Executive branch officials

- Martin O'Malley, former commissioner of the Social Security Administration (2023–2024)
- Robert Reich, former secretary of labor (1993–1997)

U.S. representatives

- Donna Edwards, former MD-4 (2008–2017)
- Ro Khanna, CA-17 (2017–present)

State legislators

- Joseline Peña-Melnyk, speaker of the Maryland House of Delegates (2025–present) from HD-21 (2007–present)

Individuals

- David Hogg, gun control activist and former vice-chair of the DNC (2025)
- Ms. Rachel, children's educator and media personality
- Mark Ruffalo, actor

Labor unions

- International Association of Machinists and Aerospace Workers
- National Union of Healthcare Workers
- National Nurses United
- Office and Professional Employees International Union

Organizations

- 50501 movement
- Bend the Arc: Jewish Action
- High School Democrats of America
- Indivisible Project
- MoveOn
- Our Revolution
- Sunrise Movement
- Working Families Party
Uncommitted

Local officials

- Zohran Mamdani, mayor of New York City (2026–present)
- Gavin Newsom, governor of California (2019–present; outgoing)
Against Schumer

U.S. representatives

- Beto O'Rourke, former TX-16 (2013–2019)

Individuals

- Jon Stewart, comedian and political commentator

== See also ==
- 2022 Senate Republican Conference leadership election
- 2024 Senate Republican Conference leadership election
- 2027 Speaker of the United States House of Representatives election
