= 1994 Senate Democratic Caucus leadership election =

- December 2, 1994

47 Democratic Senators and Senators-elect in the 104th Congress 24 votes needed to win
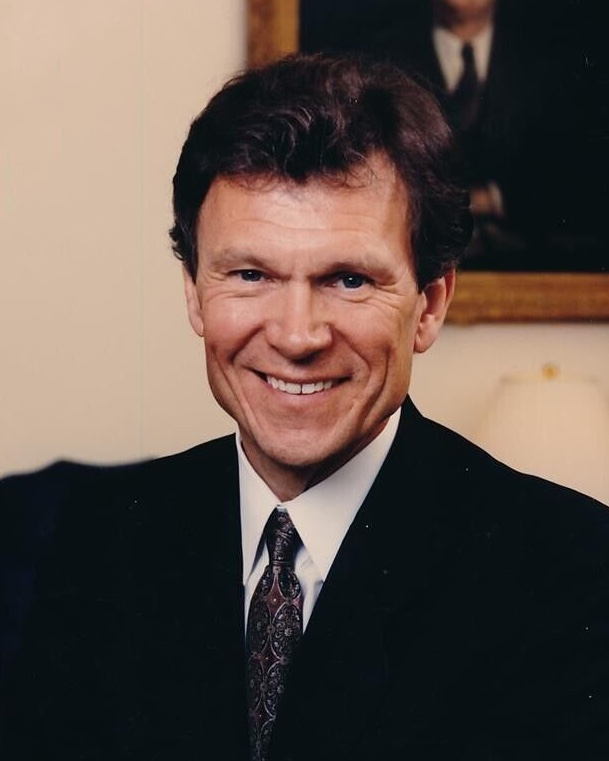

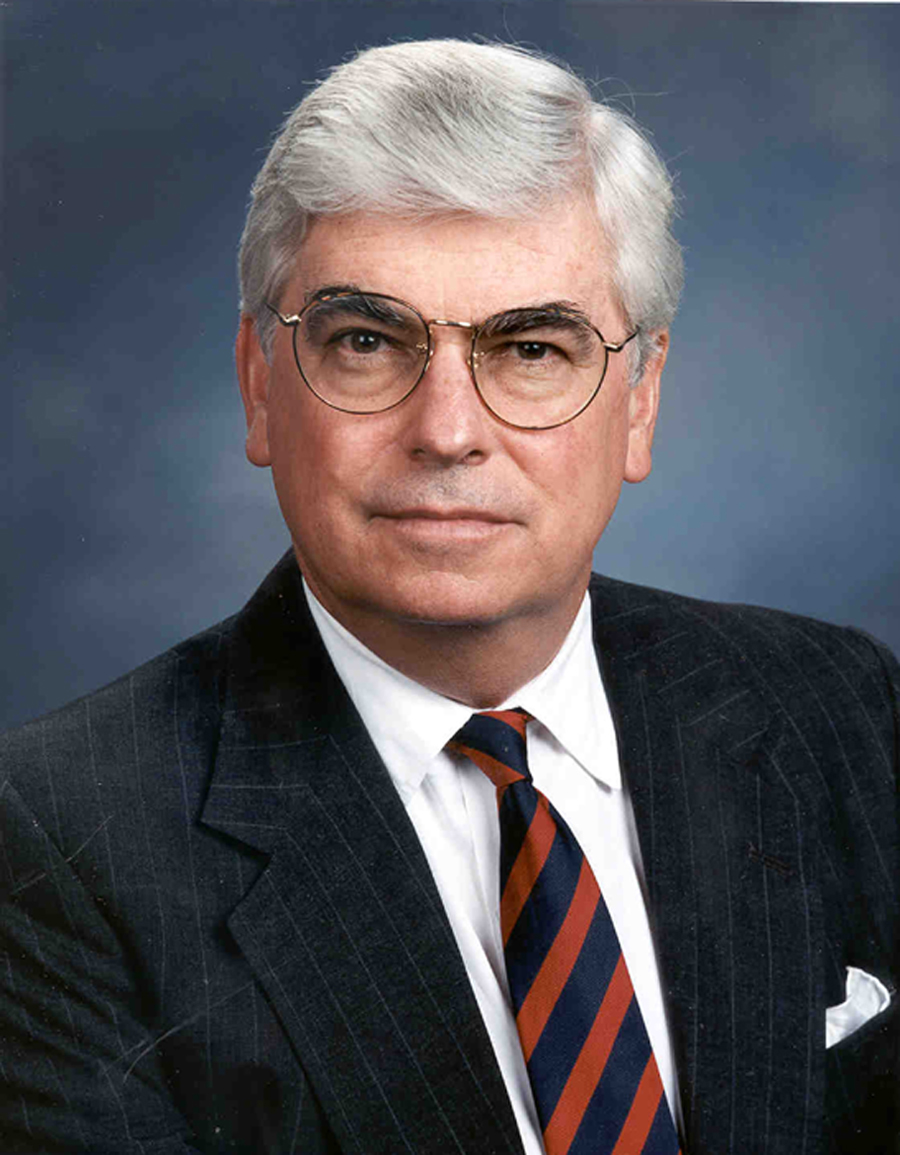
Candidate	Tom Daschle	Chris Dodd
Home state	South Dakota	Connecticut
Members' vote	24	23
Percentage	51.06%	48.94%
Leader before election
George J. Mitchell
Elected Leader
Tom Daschle

The 1994 Senate Democratic Caucus leadership election was held on December 2, 1994, to elect the leader of the Senate Democratic Caucus. Incumbent George J. Mitchell retired from the Senate. Frontrunner for the position Senator Jim Sasser of Tennessee unexpectedly lost re-election, leading to a battle between senator from South Dakota Tom Daschle and senator from Connecticut Chris Dodd. Daschle won by a single vote.

Senator Ben Nighthorse Campbell, who little more than three months later would switch to the Republican Party, cast the deciding vote.

This would be the last time a Senate Democratic Caucus leadership election would be contested until 2026.

== Background ==
Initially, Daschle was expected to face Jim Sasser, but Sasser lost his re-election bid.

== Candidates ==
The following candidates declared their intent to run.

Candidate	State	Other Senate roles
Tom Daschle	South Dakota (Served since 1987)	None
Chris Dodd	Connecticut (Served since 1981)	None

=== Withdrawn ===
Candidate	State	Other Senate roles
Jim Sasser	Tennessee (Served since 1977)	Chair of the Senate Budget Committee (Since 1989)

=== Endorsements ===
Tom Daschle

Senators

- Daniel Akaka, Senator from Hawaii (1990–2013)
- Jeff Bingaman, Senator from New Mexico (1983–2013)
- Carol Mosley Braun, Senator from Illinois (1993–1999)
- Howell Heflin, Senator from Alabama (1979–1997)
- Bob Kerrey, Senator from Nebraska (1989–2001)
- John Kerry, Senator from Massachusetts (1985–2013)
- Frank Lautenberg, Senator from New Jersey (1982–2001)
- Carl Levin, Senator from Michigan (1979–2015)
- Barbara Mikulski, Senator from Maryland (1987–2017)
Chris Dodd

Senators

- Dale Bumpers, Senator from Arkansas (1975–1999)
- Robert Byrd, Senator from West Virginia (1959–2010)
- Wendell Ford, Senator from Kentucky (1974–1999)
- Daniel Inouye, Senator from Hawaii (1963–2012)
- J. Bennett Johnston, Senator from Louisiana (1972–1997)
- Patty Murray, Senator from Washington (1993–present)
- Sam Nunn, Senator from Georgia (1972–1997)
Jim Sasser (withdrawn)

Senators

- Barbara Boxer, Senator from California (1993–2017)
- ~~Robert Byrd, Senator from West Virginia (1959–2010)~~ (Later shifted endorsement to Dodd)
- Chris Dodd, Senator from Connecticut (1981–2011)
- ~~Howell Heflin, Senator from Alabama (1979–1997)~~ (Later shifted endorsement to Daschle)
- ~~Wendell Ford, Senator from Kentucky (1974–1999)~~ (Later shifted endorsement to Dodd)
- ~~Frank Lautenberg, Senator from New Jersey (1982–2001)~~ (Later shifted endorsement to Daschle)

== Results ==
Candidate	Votes	Percent
Tom Daschle	24	51%
Chris Dodd	23	49%
Total:	47	100%
