= 1996 Senate Republican Conference leadership election =

United States political party election

- June 12, 1996
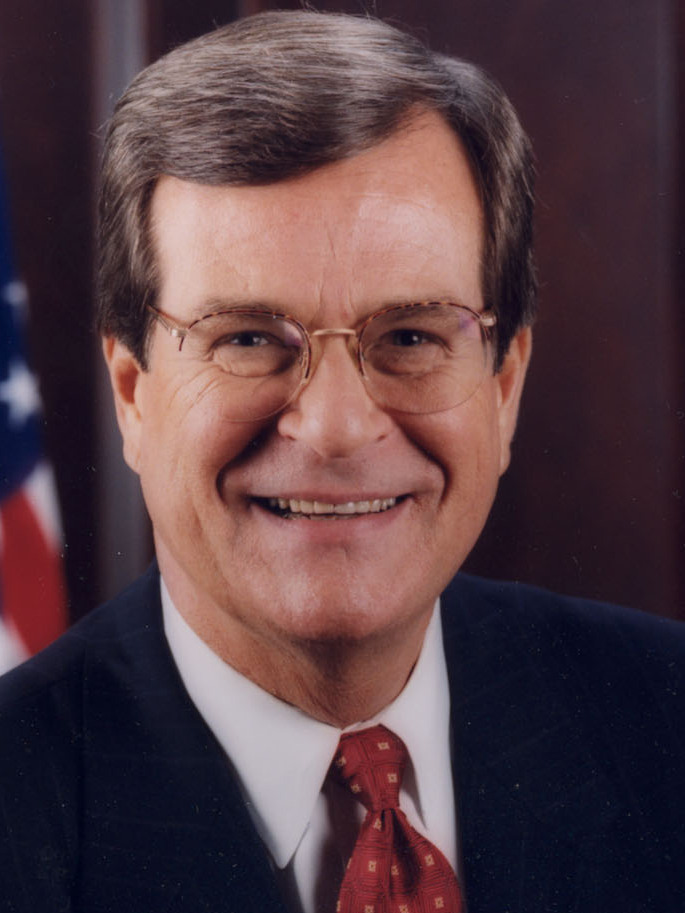

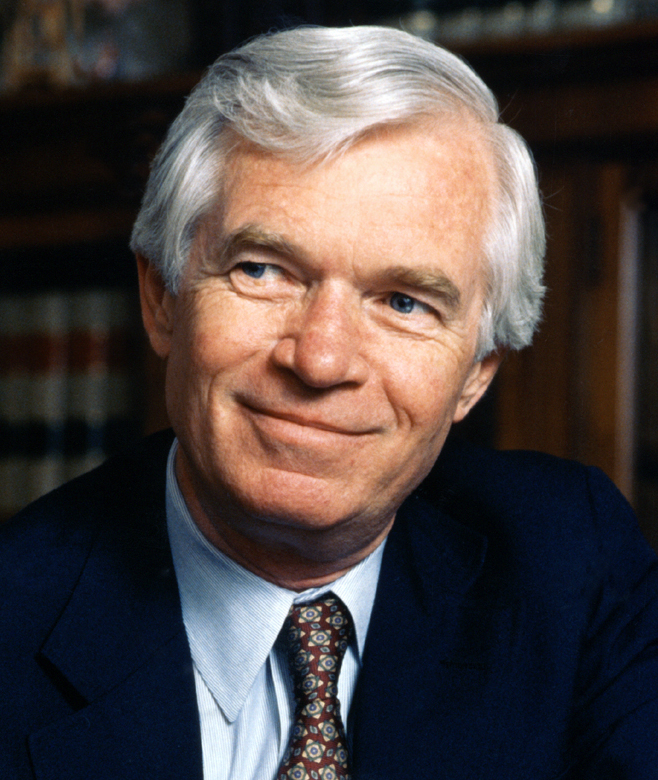
Candidate	Trent Lott	Thad Cochran
Home state	Mississippi	Mississippi
Members' vote	44	8
Percentage	84.6%	15.4%
Leader before election
Vacant
Elected Leader
Trent Lott

The 1996 Senate Republican Conference leadership election was held on June 12, 1996, to elect the leader of the Senate Republican Conference following incumbent Bob Dole's resignation the previous day to focus on his ultimately unsuccessful presidential campaign.

Senate Majority Whip Trent Lott of Mississippi won the election, defeating his colleague from the same state and Chair of the Senate Republican Conference Thad Cochran by a wide margin.

This was the last contested Senate Republican Conference leadership election until 2022.

== Candidates ==
The following candidates declared their intent to run.

Candidate	State	Other Senate roles
Trent Lott	Mississippi (Served since 1989)	Republican Senate Whip (Since 1995)
Thad Cochran	Mississippi (Served since 1978)	Chair of the Senate Republican Conference (Since 1991); Vice Chair of the Senate Republican Conference (1985–1991)

== Results ==
Candidate	Votes	Percent
Trent Lott	44	85%
Thad Cochran	8	15%
Total:	52	100%
