= 1984 Senate Democratic Caucus leadership election =

- December 12, 1984

47 Democratic Senators and Senators-elect in the 99th Congress 24 votes needed to win
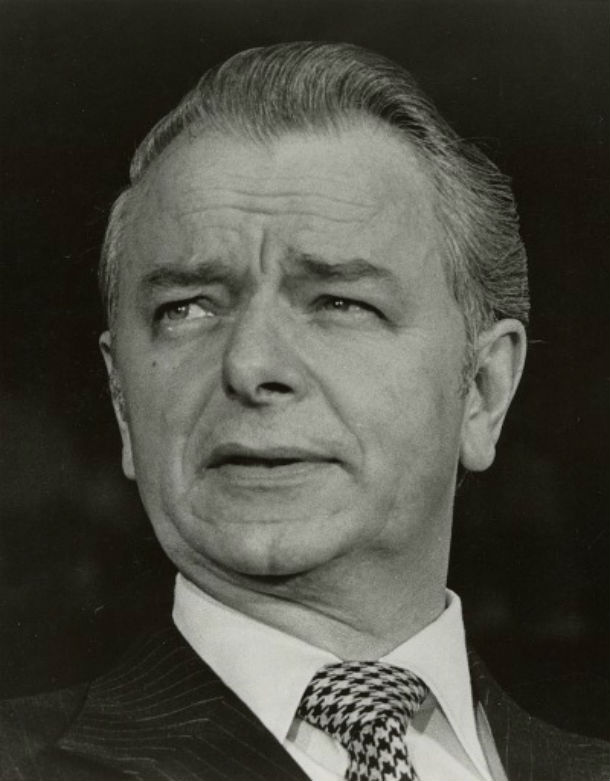

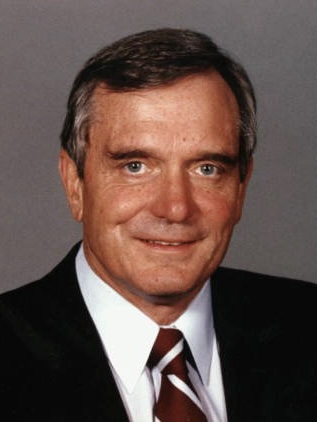
Candidate	Robert Byrd	Lawton Chiles
Home state	West Virginia	Florida
Members' vote	36	11
Percentage	76.60%	23.40%
Leader before election
Robert Byrd
Elected Leader
Robert Byrd

The 1984 Senate Democratic Caucus leadership election was held on December 12, 1984, to elect the leader of the Senate Democratic Caucus. Incumbent Robert Byrd fended off a leadership challenge from Senator Lawton Chiles of Florida. This is the first time an incumbent Senate Democratic Caucus leader was challenged in an election, which would not happen again until 2026.

== Candidates ==
The following candidates declared their intent to run.

Candidate	State	Other Senate roles
Robert Byrd	West Virginia (Served since 1959)	Chair of the Senate Democratic Caucus (1977—1989); Senate Minority Leader (1981—1987); Senate Majority Leader (1977—1981); Senate Majority Whip (1971—1977); Secretary of the Senate Democratic Caucus (1967—1971)
Lawton Chiles	Florida (Served since 1971)	Ranking Member of the Senate Budget Committee (1983–1987); Ranking Member of the Senate Aging Committee (1981–1983); Chair of the Senate Aging Committee (1979–1981)

== Results ==
Candidate	Votes	Percent
Robert Byrd	36	77%
Lawton Chiles	11	23%
Total:	47	100%
