= 2019 Speaker of the United States House of Representatives election =

- January 3, 2019

Needed to win: Majority of the votes cast 430 votes cast, 216 needed for a majority
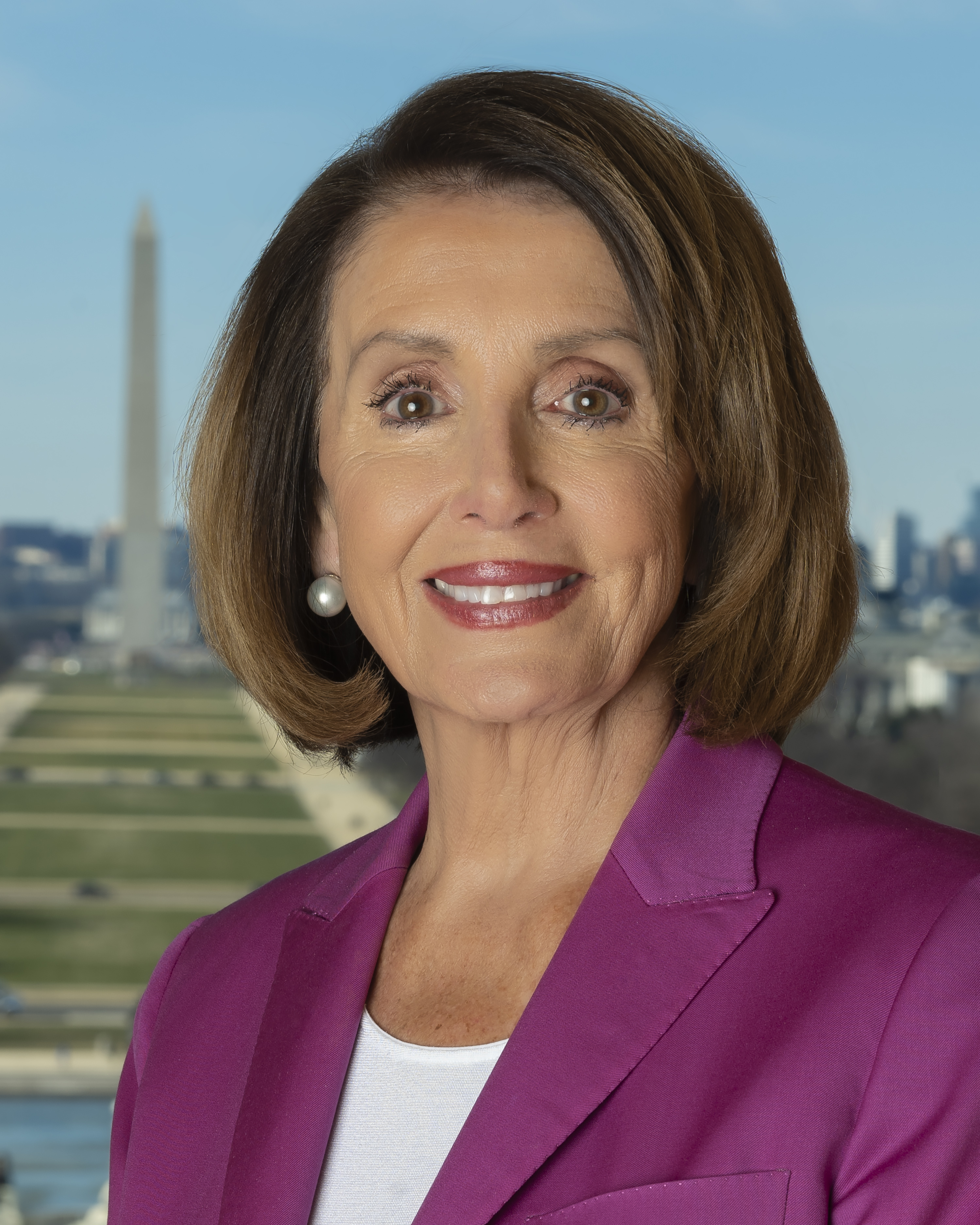

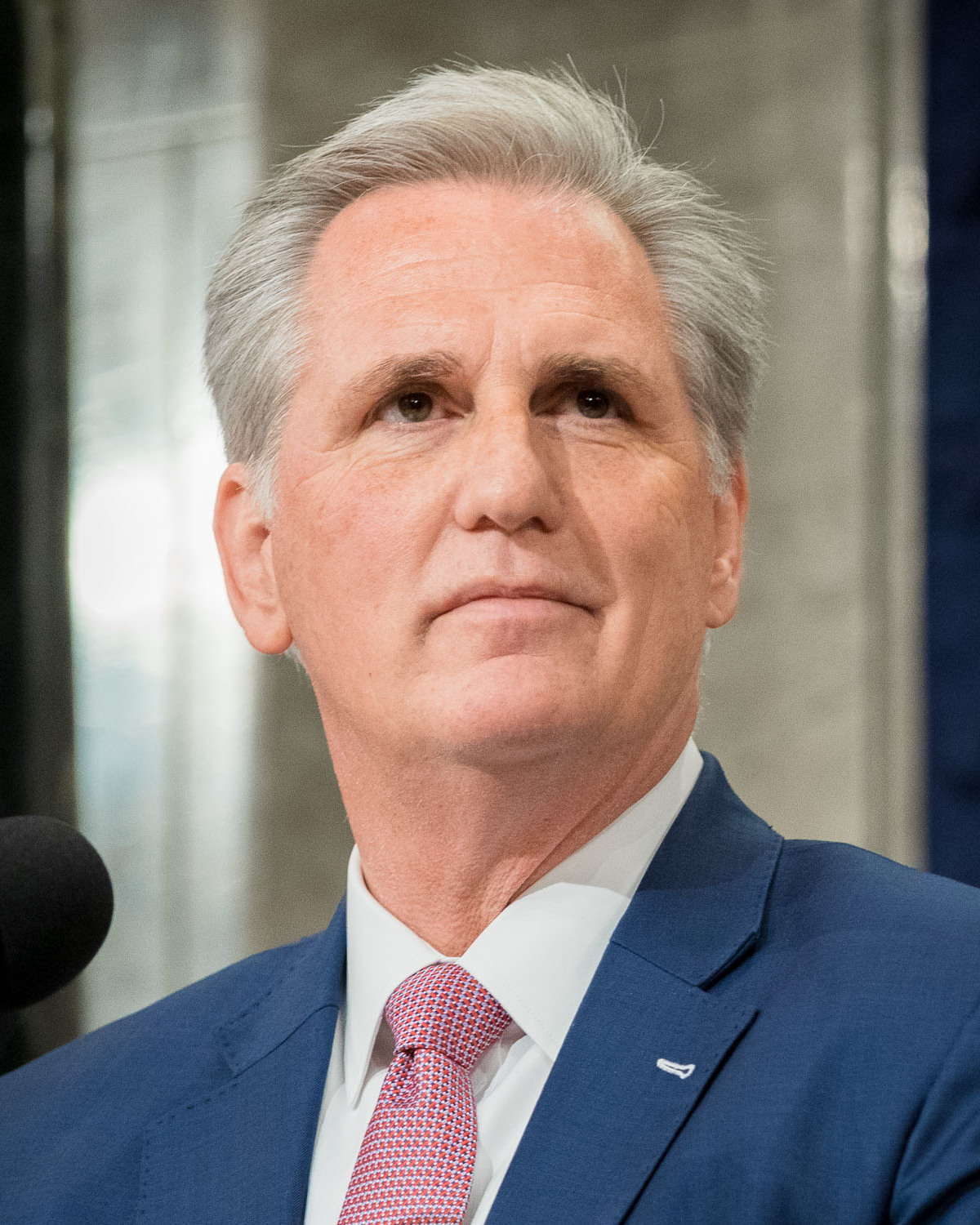

	Majority party	Minority party
Candidate	Nancy Pelosi	Kevin McCarthy
Party	Democratic	Republican
Leader's seat	California 12th	California 23rd
Members' vote	220	192
Percentage	51.16%	44.65%
Candidate	Others
Members' vote	18
Percentage	4.19%
Speaker before election
Paul Ryan
Republican
Elected Speaker
Nancy Pelosi
Democratic

On January 3, 2019, the first day of the 116th United States Congress and two months after the 2018 U.S. House elections, the incoming members of the U.S. House of Representatives held an election for speaker of the U.S. House of Representatives. This was the 126th U.S. speaker election since the office was created in 1789.

House Democratic leader Nancy Pelosi received 220 votes, a majority of the chamber, to become its speaker. House Republican leader Kevin McCarthy garnered 192 votes, with 18 more going to others. As only 430 representatives in the 435-member House cast a vote (due to vacancies, absentees, or members being present but not voting), 216 votes were necessary in order to win.

Immediately after the election, the Dean of the United States House of Representatives, Don Young, administered the oath of office to the new speaker. Pelosi in turn administered the oath of office en masse to the rest of the members of the United States House of Representatives.

Incumbent speaker Paul Ryan did not run for re-election to the House. With the Democratic caucus assuming control of the House in January 2019, Pelosi had been the speaker-presumptive since the incoming House Democratic Caucus formally nominated her the previous November.

== Process and conventions ==
The speaker of the United States House of Representatives is the presiding officer of the United States House of Representatives. The House elects its speaker at the beginning of a new Congress (i.e. biennially, after a general election) or when a speaker dies, resigns or is removed from the position intra-term. Since 1839, the House has elected speakers by roll call vote. Traditionally, each party's caucus or conference selects a candidate for the speakership from among its senior leaders prior to the roll call. Representatives are not restricted to voting for the candidate nominated by their party, but generally do, as the outcome of the election effectively determines which party has the majority and consequently will organize the House. Representatives that choose to vote for someone other than their party's nominated candidate usually vote for another member within the party or vote "present".

Moreover, as the Constitution does not explicitly state that the speaker must be an incumbent member of the House, it is permissible for representatives to vote for someone who is not a member of the House at the time, and non-members have received a few votes in various speaker elections over the past several years. Nevertheless, every person elected speaker has been a member.

To be elected speaker, a candidate must receive an absolute majority of the votes cast, as opposed to an absolute majority of the full membership of the House – presently 218 votes, in a House of 435. There have only been a few instances during the past century where a person received a majority of the votes cast, and thus won the election, while failing to obtain a majority of the full membership. At the time, it happened most recently in January 2015 (114th Congress), when John Boehner was elected with 216 votes (as opposed to 218). Such a variation in the number of votes necessary to win a given election might arise due to vacancies, absentees, or members being present but not voting. If no candidate wins a majority of the "votes cast for a person by name," then the roll call is repeated until a speaker is elected. Multiple roll calls have previously been needed only once since the American Civil War; they last occurred in 1923 and would not occur again until 2023. Upon winning election the new speaker is immediately sworn in by the Dean of the United States House of Representatives, the chamber's longest-serving member.

== Democratic Party ==
During the midterm election campaign, there were indications that many of the incoming Democrats would not support party leader Nancy Pelosi for the speakership. After taking back the House in November, Ohio Rep. Marcia Fudge was mentioned as a possible alternative. However, she quickly bowed out after being offered the chairmanship of the House Administration Subcommittee on Elections. Other possible defectors, including incoming New York Rep. Alexandria Ocasio-Cortez, later publicly declared their support for Pelosi.

=== Nominee ===
- Rep. Nancy Pelosi (D-CA), House Minority Leader and former Speaker

=== Declined to run ===
- Rep. Karen Bass (D-CA) (endorsed Pelosi)
- Rep. Steny Hoyer (D-MD) (named majority leader)
- Rep. Marcia Fudge (D-OH) (endorsed Pelosi; was named chair of House Administration Subcommittee on Elections)
- Rep. Hakeem Jeffries (D-NY) (won race for Democratic Conference Caucus Chair defeating Barbara Lee)
- Rep. Seth Moulton (D-MA)

=== Results ===
The Democratic caucus vote was held on November 28, 2018; as Pelosi was the only declared candidate, the vote was presented as a single question of approval.

Candidate	Votes	Percent
Yes ✓	203	85.29%
No	32	13.45%
Blank ballots	3	1.26%

== Republican Party ==
The race for the leadership of the House Republicans began well before Ryan's official announcement, as it had been rumored for months.

=== Nominee ===
- Rep. Kevin McCarthy (R-CA), House Majority Leader

=== Lost nomination ===
- Rep. Jim Jordan (R-OH)

=== Declined to run ===
- Rep. Steve Scalise (R-LA) (endorsed Kevin McCarthy), House Majority Whip
- Rep. Mark Walker (R-NC) (ran for vice-chair of Republican Conference and won)

=== Endorsements ===
Jim Jordan

U.S. representatives

- Rep. Mark Meadows (R-NC), Chairman of the House Freedom Caucus
- Rep. Matt Gaetz (R-FL)
- Rep. Andy Biggs (R-AZ)
- Rep-elect. Ron Wright (R-TX)
- Rep. Justin Amash (R-MI)
- Rep. Thomas Massie (R-KY)
- Rep. Warren Davidson (R-OH)
- Rep-elect. Chip Roy (R-TX)
- Rep. Louie Gohmert (R-TX)
- Former Rep. Joe Walsh (R-IL)
- Outgoing Rep. Dave Brat (R-VA)
- Former Rep. and Florida Governor-elect Ron DeSantis (R-FL)
- Rep. Alex Mooney (R-WV)

State attorneys general

- Ken Cuccinelli, 2013 Republican Nominee for Virginia Governor and Former Attorney General of Virginia

Individuals

- Sean Hannity

Organizations

- FreedomWorks
- Club for Growth
- Tea Party Patriots Citizens Fund
Kevin McCarthy

U.S. representatives

- Rep. Rodney Davis (R-IL)
- Rep. Adam Kinzinger (R-IL)
- Rep. Jodey Arrington (R-TX)
- Rep. Tom Graves (R-GA)
- Rep-elect. Dan Crenshaw (R-TX)
- Rep. Pete Olson (R-TX)
- Rep. Bill Flores (R-TX)
- Rep. Frank Lucas (R-OK)
- Outgoing Rep. Paul Ryan (R-WI), Speaker of the House
- Rep. Steve Scalise (R-LA), Majority Whip

=== Polling ===
Poll source	Date(s) administered	Sample size	Margin of error	Jim Jordan	Steve Scalise	Kevin McCarthy	Other	Undecided
The Economist/YouGov	September 30 – October 2, 2018	1,500	±2.9%	18%	16%	8%	1%	45%
Morning Consult/Politico	August 10–12, 2018	1,992	±2.0%	11%	9%	18%	–	–

=== Results ===
The Republican Caucus vote was held on November 14, 2018, electing McCarthy to serve their leader during the 116th Congress.

Candidate	Votes	Percent
Kevin McCarthy ✓	159	78.7%
Jim Jordan	43	21.3%

== Election of the speaker ==
In the run-up to the election, Pelosi was able to secure enough support to ensure her the speakership, though there were still a few holdouts. She accomplished this by, among other things, pledging to limit her time as speaker to four years (two two-year terms) at most.

Upon convening at the start of the 116th Congress, the House proceeded to elect its speaker by roll call vote, with the Clerk presiding. Rodney Davis (R-IL), Virginia Foxx (R-NC), Marcy Kaptur (D-OH) and Zoe Lofgren (D-CA) were appointed to serve as tellers to tabulate the vote. Ultimately, Pelosi received 220 of the 430 votes cast, though 15 Democrats chose to vote for someone else. Republicans, with six exceptions, voted for party leader McCarthy, who garnered 192 votes. The vote count in the January 3, 2019 speaker of the House election was:

2019 election for speaker – 116th Congress
Party	Candidate	Votes	%
Democratic	Nancy Pelosi (CA 12)	220	51.17
Republican	Kevin McCarthy (CA 23)	192	44.66
Republican	Jim Jordan (OH 4)	5	1.16
Democratic	Cheri Bustos (IL 17)	4	0.93
Democratic	Tammy Duckworth	2	0.47
Democratic	Stacey Abrams	1	0.23
Democratic	Joe Biden	1	0.23
Democratic	Marcia Fudge (OH 11)	1	0.23
Democratic	Joe Kennedy III (MA 4)	1	0.23
Democratic	John Lewis (GA 5)	1	0.23
Republican	Thomas Massie (KY 4)	1	0.23
Democratic	Stephanie Murphy (FL 7)	1	0.23
Total votes		430	100
Votes necessary		216	>50

Representatives voting for someone other than their party's speaker nominee were:
■ Andy Biggs and Paul Gosar of Arizona; Jody Hice of Georgia; Thomas Massie of Kentucky; and Scott Perry of Pennsylvania voted for Jim Jordan;
■ Joe Cunningham of South Carolina; Jared Golden of Maine; Mikie Sherrill of New Jersey; and Abigail Spanberger of Virginia voted for Cheri Bustos;
■ Jason Crow of Colorado and Max Rose of New York voted for Tammy Duckworth, who was not a member of the House at the time;
■ Kathleen Rice of New York voted for Stacey Abrams, who was not a member of the House at the time;
■ Anthony Brindisi of New York voted for Joe Biden, who was not a member of the House at the time;
■ Kurt Schrader of Oregon voted for Marcia Fudge;
■ Conor Lamb of Pennsylvania voted for Joe Kennedy III;
■ Ron Kind of Wisconsin voted for John Lewis;
■ Justin Amash of Michigan voted for Thomas Massie;
■ Ben McAdams of Utah voted for Stephanie Murphy.

Additionally, three Democrats answered present when their name was called:
■ Jim Cooper of Tennessee; Elissa Slotkin of Michigan; and Jeff Van Drew of New Jersey.
