= 2022 Senate Republican Conference leadership election =

United States political party election

- November 16, 2022

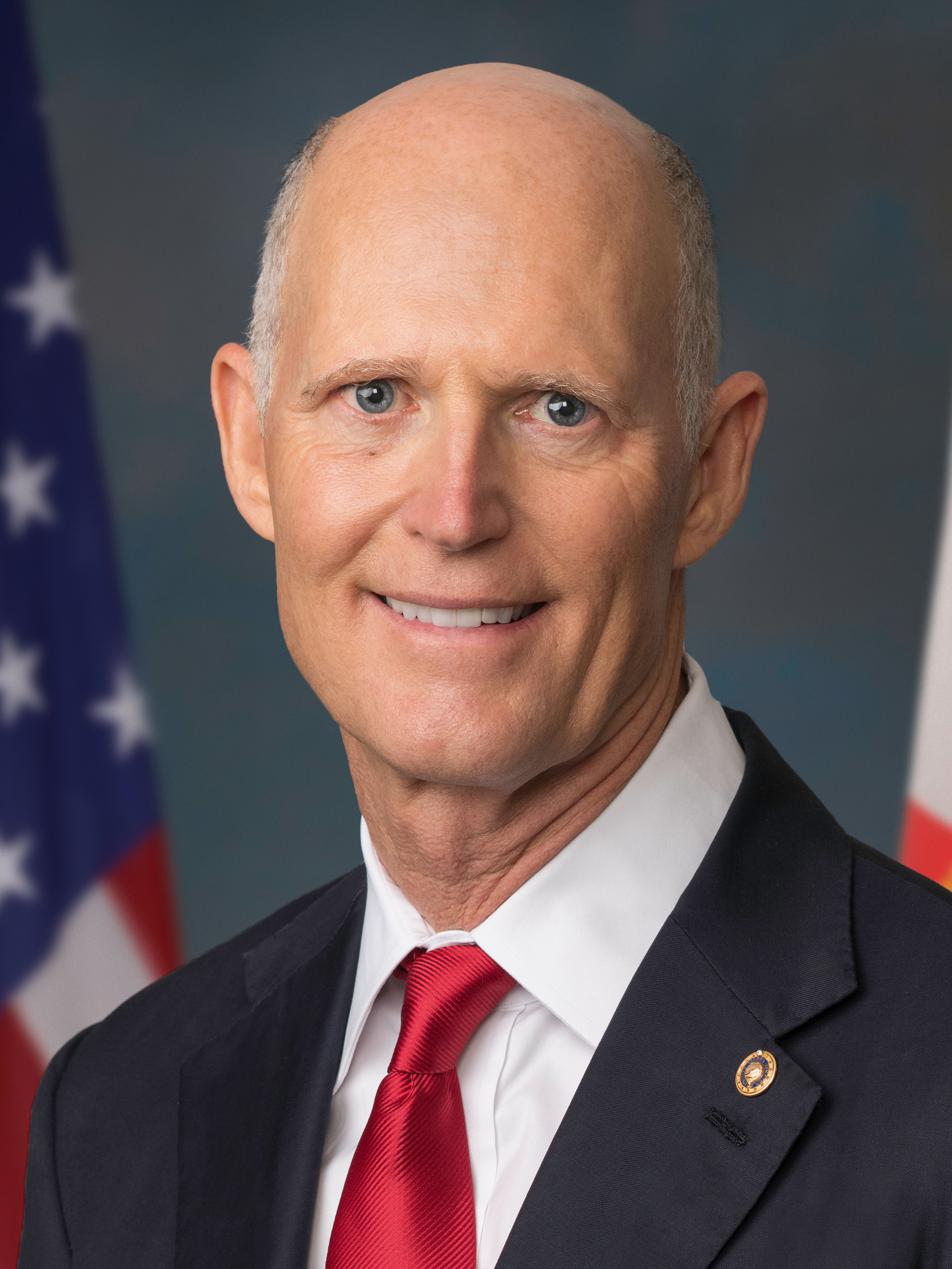
| Candidate | Mitch McConnell | Rick Scott |
| Home state | Kentucky | Florida |
| Members' vote | 37 | 10 |
| Percentage | 77.1% | 20.9% |
Leader before election
Mitch McConnell
Elected Leader
Mitch McConnell

On November 16, 2022, Republican members of the United States Senate held an election to determine the leader of the Senate Republican Conference. Incumbent leader Mitch McConnell defeated a challenge by Florida senator Rick Scott in a vote by secret ballot. This was the first contested conference leadership election since 1996, marking a break from the tradition of unanimously confirming incumbent leaders seeking re-election. Voting was limited to those expected to serve as Republican senators in the 118th Congress.

== Overview ==
Republicans failed to produce the anticipated red wave during the 2022 United States elections, leading some more conservative members to blame the outcome on current leadership, including incumbent Senate Republican Conference leader Mitch McConnell. The election also marked the first time since 1996 that a contested Senate Republican leadership challenge proceeded to a vote.

== Candidates ==
The following candidates declared their intent to run.

| Candidate | State | Other Senate roles | Ref. |
|---|---|---|---|
| Mitch McConnell | Kentucky (Served since 1985) | Leader of the Senate Republican Conference (Since 2007); Republican Senate Whip (2003–2007); Chair of the Senate Rules Committee (1999–2001) | |
| Rick Scott | Florida (Served since 2019) | Chair of the National Republican Senatorial Committee (Since 2021) | |

=== Endorsements ===
Rick Scott

Senators

- Josh Hawley, Senator from Missouri (2019–present)

== Results ==
| Candidate | Votes | Percent |
|---|---|---|
| Mitch McConnell | 37 | 77% |
| Rick Scott | 10 | 21% |
| Write-in | 1 | 2% |
| Abstentions | 1 | N/A |
| Total: | 47 | 100% |

== See also ==
- January 2023 Speaker of the United States House of Representatives election#Republican nomination
