= January 2023 Speaker of the United States House of Representatives election =

- January 3–7, 2023

Needed to win: Majority of votes cast First ballot: 434 votes cast, 218 needed for a majority Fifteenth ballot: 428 votes cast, 215 needed for a majority
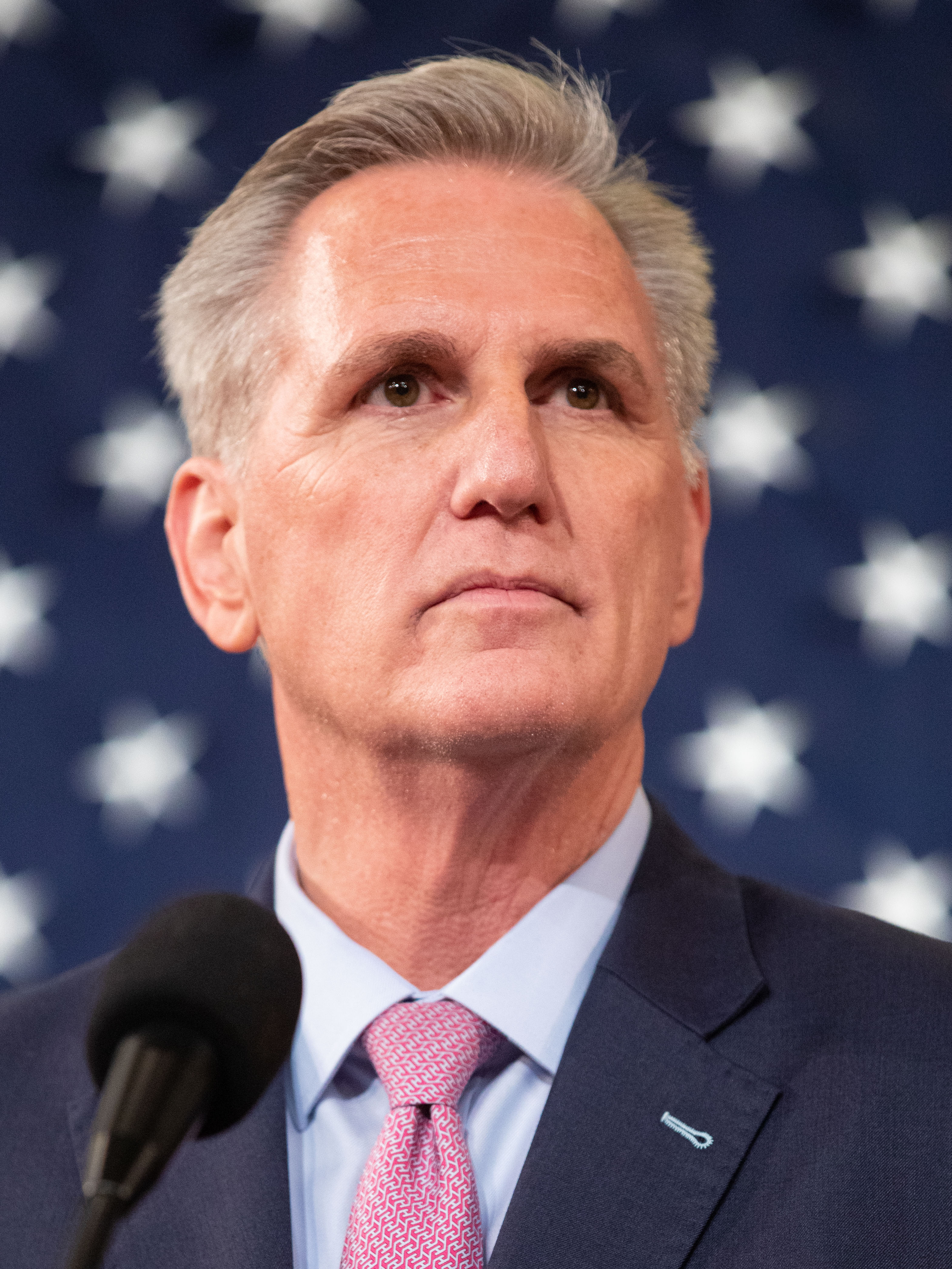

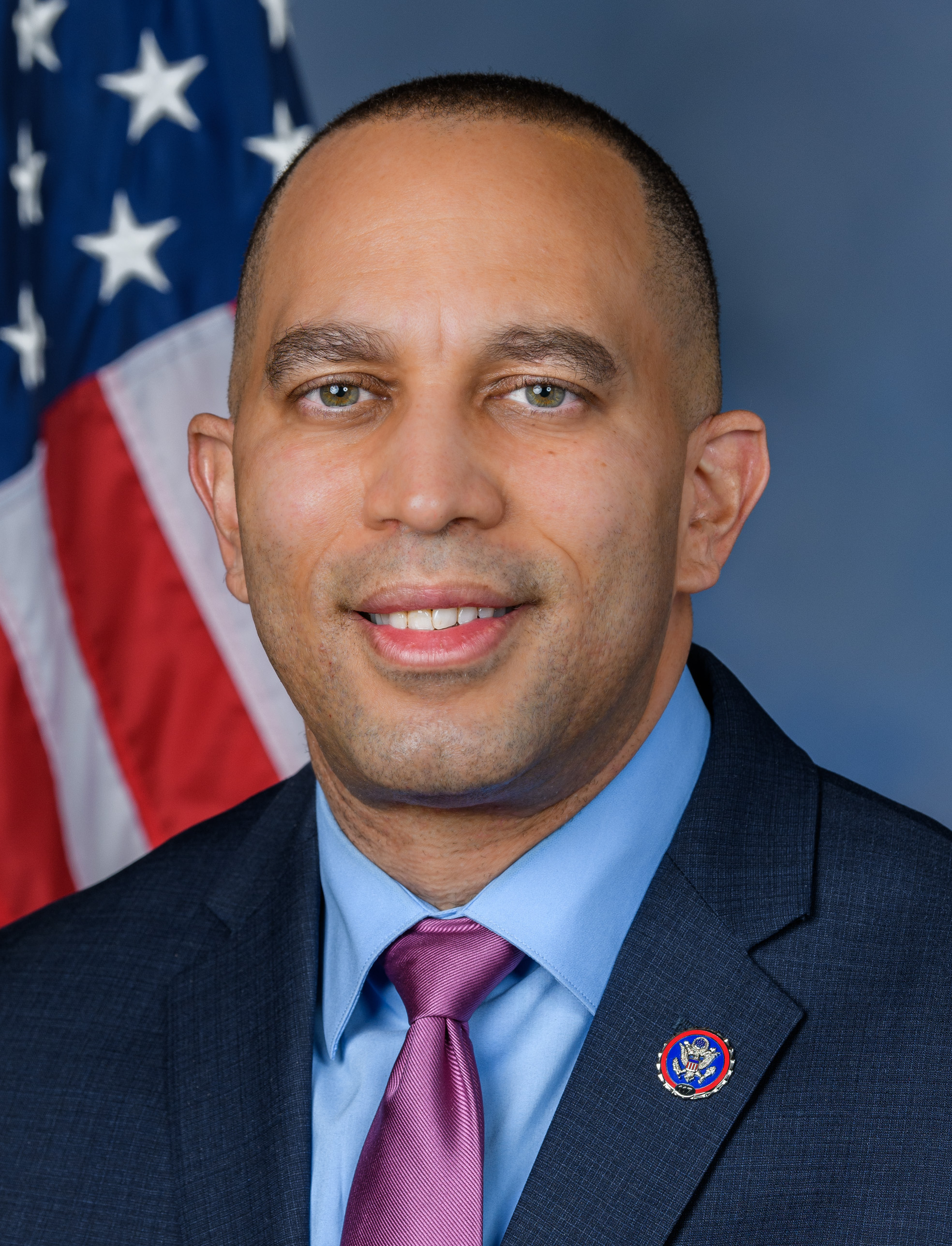

	Majority party	Minority party
Candidate	Kevin McCarthy	Hakeem Jeffries
Party	Republican	Democratic
Leader's seat	California 20th	New York 8th
First ballot	203 (46.8%)	212 (48.8%)
Final ballot	216 (50.5%)	212 (49.5%)
Candidate	Others
First ballot	19 (4.4%)
Final ballot	—
Speaker before election
Nancy Pelosi
Democratic
Elected Speaker
Kevin McCarthy
Republican

At the opening of the 118th United States Congress, the members-elect of the House of Representatives elected in the 2022 midterms held an election for its speaker, marking the 128th speaker election since the office was created in 1789. It began on January 3, 2023, and concluded in the early morning hours of January 7 when Kevin McCarthy of California, leader of the House Republican Conference, won a majority of votes cast on the fifteenth ballot. After the longest speaker election since December 1859 – February 1860, McCarthy won the speakership by making concessions to Republican Party hardliners, who had refused to support him through several rounds of voting, finding him too weak and untrustworthy.

Republicans won a narrow majority of House seats over the Democratic Party in the 2022 House elections. McCarthy won the nomination within the Republican conference but faced public opposition from far-right House Republicans before the vote. The opposition consisted mainly of members of the Freedom Caucus. With 19 Republicans voting for candidates other than McCarthy on the first ballot, no candidate achieved a majority and the election proceeded to additional ballots for the first time since 1923. In the first round of voting, House Democratic Caucus leader Hakeem Jeffries of New York received 212 votes, McCarthy received 203 votes, and Andy Biggs of Arizona received 10 votes; other candidates who were not formally nominated received 9 votes.

On the second through the fourteenth votes, McCarthy again failed to receive a majority of votes cast. Jeffries received the support of all Democrats present on each ballot. Most or all of the Republican opposition voted for Jim Jordan of Ohio on the second and third rounds and Byron Donalds of Florida on the fourth through eleventh rounds. Kevin Hern of Oklahoma and former president Donald Trump were also nominated and received votes in various rounds. On the fourth day of voting, January 6, many of the Republicans who opposed McCarthy began voting for him following negotiations between rounds. On the fifteenth and final ballot, the six remaining anti-McCarthy holdouts voted "present", which reduced the threshold of votes needed for a majority from 218 to 215, thus allowing McCarthy to be elected with 216 votes. Among the concessions made by McCarthy to the holdouts was agreeing that the House rules for the 118th United States Congress would allow a single member to independently bring a motion to vacate the speakership. This concession proved consequential. Less than ten months later, Matt Gaetz (one of the holdouts) brought such a motion, which prevailed, thereby ousting McCarthy from the speakership.

== Process and conventions ==
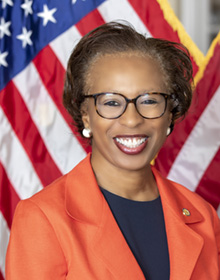
As the clerk of the House, Cheryl Johnson oversaw the 2023 election of a speaker as the acting presiding officer.

The speaker is the presiding officer of the U.S. House of Representatives. The House elects its speaker at the beginning of a new Congress (i.e. biennially, after Election Day) or when a speaker dies, resigns, or is removed from the position intra-term. Since 1839, the House has elected speakers by roll call vote. Following a congressional election and the adjournment of the prior congress, there being no speaker, the House clerk summons, convenes, and calls the House to order. After prayer offered by the House chaplain, the clerk leads the representatives in the Pledge of Allegiance before ordering a roll call conducted by the reading clerk. The clerk and its officers then order and oversee the election of a speaker. During these processes, the clerk must "preserve order and decorum and decide all questions of order", which is subject to appeal to the body.

Traditionally, each of the party caucuses and conferences selects a candidate for the speakership from among its senior leaders prior to the roll call. Representatives are not restricted to voting for the candidate nominated by their party but generally do, as the outcome of the election effectively determines which one is the majority party and consequently will organize the House. Without a speaker, members-elect of the House cannot be sworn in. (Note: The Twentieth Amendment states that all members' terms begin at noon on January 3. Until officially sworn-in, members are referred to as members-elect.) The House is unable to conduct any business other than electing the speaker. Because the rules of the House are adopted for each new Congress, the House will not have rules until the election is complete allowing the members to be sworn in and the House to adopt rules.

Representatives that choose to vote for someone other than their party's nominated candidate usually vote for another member within the party or vote present, which entails abstention. Moreover, as the Constitution does not explicitly state that the speaker must be an incumbent member of the House, it is permissible for representatives to nominate and vote for someone who is not a member of the House at the time, and non-members have been nominated and received a few votes in various speaker elections over the past several years. Nevertheless, every person elected speaker has been a member. Upon winning election, the new speaker is immediately sworn in by the House dean, the chamber's longest-serving member. The new speaker then administers the oath en masse to the rest of the members of the House.

To be elected speaker, a candidate must receive a majority of the current votes cast, as opposed to a majority of the entire membership of the House—at the time 218 votes, in a House of 434 members, due to one vacancy caused by the death of Donald McEachin of Virginia. There have only been a few instances during the past century where a person received a majority of the votes cast and thus won the election while failing to obtain a majority of the full membership. It had happened most recently in 2021, when Nancy Pelosi was elected with 216 votes (as opposed to 218). Such a variation in the number of votes necessary to win a given election might arise due to vacancies, absentees, or members being present but not voting. If no candidate wins a majority of the votes cast for a person by name, then the roll call is repeated until a speaker is elected. The most recent multi-ballot election prior to the January 2023 contest occurred in December 1923, when a closely divided House needed nine ballots to elect Frederick H. Gillett speaker.

== Democratic nomination ==
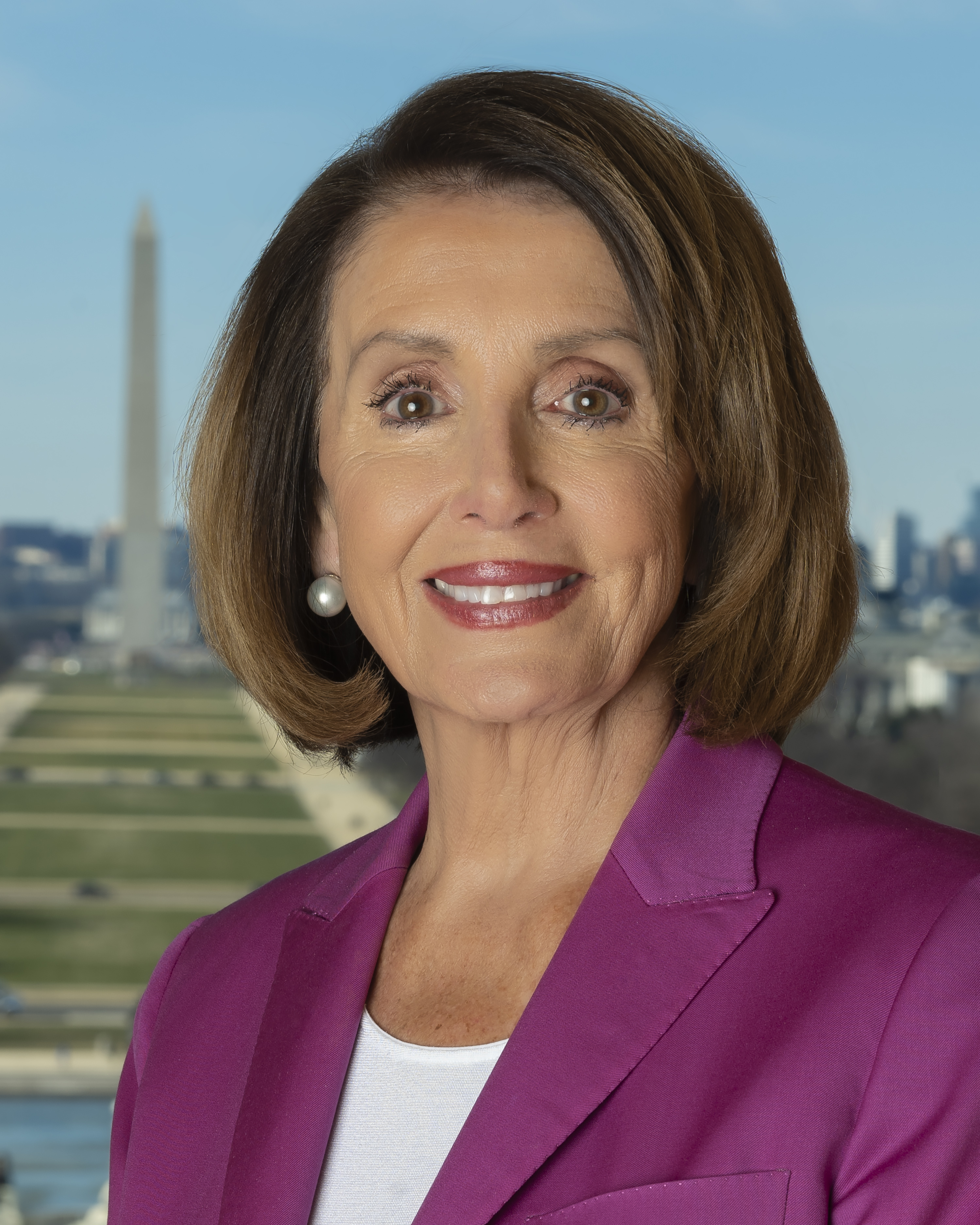
Nancy Pelosi of California, the outgoing speaker, retired from the position and announced her support for Hakeem Jeffries of New York.

During the run-up to the 2019 speaker election, Nancy Pelosi, who had been the Democratic Caucus' leader and nominee in every speaker election since 2003, struck a deal with several caucus members in which she promised that she would retire from the position of speaker after the 2022 congressional elections in exchange for those members' votes in that speakership election, which she saw as necessary in order for her to win a majority. By early 2022, Congressman Hakeem Jeffries of New York was viewed as the top prospect to succeed Pelosi if she were to retire as the leader of the Democratic Caucus. However, ahead of the 2022 election Pelosi refused to confirm whether she intended to honor her pledge to serve no further terms as leader. On November 17, 2022, the same day that news outlets projected that Democrats had failed to defend their House majority in the midterm elections, Pelosi delivered a speech on the House floor in which she announced that she would not run again for a leadership position. The following day, Jeffries distributed a letter to House Democratic Caucus members declaring his intent to run to succeed Pelosi. No opponent challenged Jeffries, and on November 30 the Democratic Caucus voted to make Jeffries its leader during the 118th Congress and its nominee for the speakership election. Jeffries is the first black person ever nominated for House speaker.

=== Candidates ===
==== Nominee ====
- Hakeem Jeffries, incumbent leader of the House Democratic Caucus, and representative from New York's 8th district

==== Declined to run ====
- Jim Clyburn, outgoing majority whip, former assistant Democratic leader, and representative from South Carolina's 6th district
- Steny Hoyer, outgoing House Majority Leader and representative from Maryland's 5th district
- Nancy Pelosi, outgoing speaker of the House, former minority leader, and representative from California's 12th district
- Adam Schiff, incumbent chair of the House Intelligence Committee, and representative from California's 28th district
- Pete Aguilar, incumbent vice chair of the Democratic caucus, and representative from California's 31st district
- Katherine Clark, incumbent assistant speaker, former vice chair of the Democratic caucus, and representative from Massachusetts's 5th district

=== Results ===
On November 30, Jeffries was selected by acclamation.

Candidate	Votes	Percent
Hakeem Jeffries ✓	—	100%

== Republican nomination ==
On November 15, 2022, in a secret ballot the House Republican Conference voted to retain Kevin McCarthy as its leader and nominee for the House speakership. However, McCarthy did not receive the votes of 218 members of the conference, the support needed to have a majority of all House members that would be in office at the start of the 118th Congress.

As Republican Conference leader, McCarthy had been the Republican Conference's nominee for the speakership in both the 2019 and 2021 speaker elections in which Democratic majorities elected Nancy Pelosi as speaker. However, McCarthy's first pursuit of the House speakership had been the October 2015 speaker election, which was held after John Boehner resigned under pressure from conservative hardliners and the Freedom Caucus, Kevin McCarthy sought the Republican nomination and was initially judged as the party's preferred candidate. After the House Freedom Caucus refused to vote for McCarthy in a floor vote for the speakership, it became evident that McCarthy had not secured the support of a congressional majority that would be needed to elect him speaker. As a result, McCarthy withdrew from the race, and Paul Ryan was elected speaker. Ryan did not seek reelection to the House during the 2018 elections. After the elections, in which Republicans lost their House majority to the Democrats, the Republican Conference elected McCarthy to serve as their leader in the next congress. During the 116th Congress and 117th which followed, McCarthy was the House minority leader.

=== Candidates ===
==== Nominee ====
- Kevin McCarthy, former majority and minority leader, and representative from California's 23rd district

==== Lost nomination ====
- Andy Biggs, former chair of the Freedom Caucus and representative from Arizona's 5th district

=== Results ===
The House Republican Conference vote was held on November 15, 2022, and despite a challenge from Biggs, McCarthy won the majority of votes, becoming the Republican nominee for speaker of the House. As McCarthy won less than 218 votes, a majority of the seats in the House, the media started questioning his ability to be voted in as Speaker.

Candidate	Votes	Percent
Kevin McCarthy ✓	188	85.8%
Andy Biggs	31	14.2%

== Election of the speaker ==
=== Background ===
The election for speaker began on January 3, 2023, at the start of the 118th Congress. At the time of the proceedings, there was one vacant seat, Virginia's 4th district.

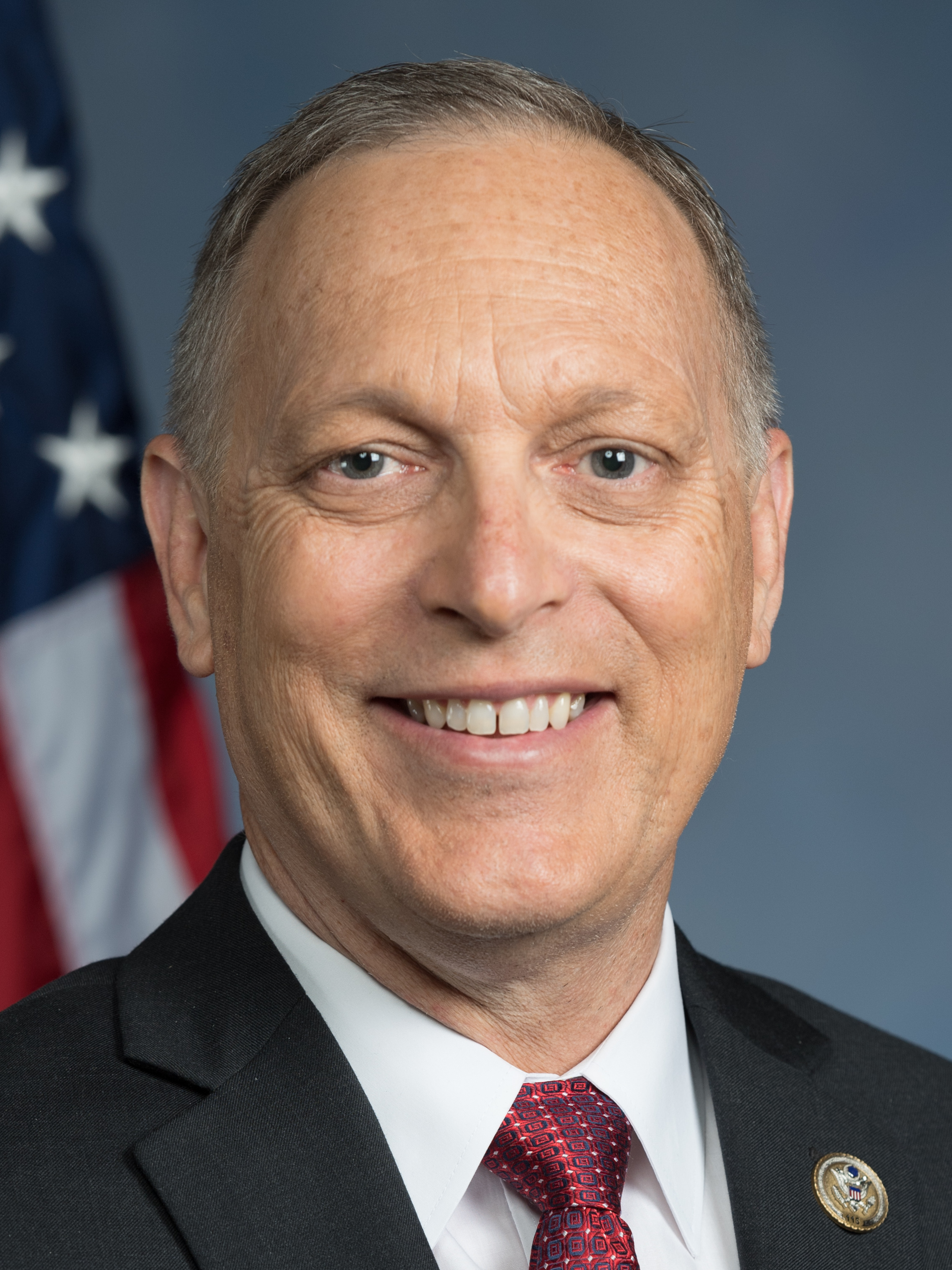
Andy Biggs of Arizona was nominated on the first ballot as part of the right-wing opposition to Kevin McCarthy of California.

In anticipation of right-wing opposition to McCarthy's election as speaker, Don Bacon of Nebraska threatened to form a coalition of moderate Republicans who would work with the Democrats to successfully install a speaker. Several names were floated as a potential compromise candidate, the most prominent of which was Fred Upton, a moderate Republican who had been the representative for Michigan's 6th congressional district up to his retirement in the 2022 election cycle. McCarthy and his supporters spent December and the first days of January negotiating with right-wing opponents of McCarthy to persuade them to support him on the floor. At a closed-door meeting shortly before the speaker vote on January 3, Mike Rogers of Alabama threatened dissident Republicans with removal from House committees.

Prior to the vote, Politico reported that at least five Republican representatives had refused to support McCarthy, while another nine had not publicly commented on whether they would. As the Republican Party won a slim majority (222–212) and assuming Democratic members would not vote for him, McCarthy could only sustain as many as four Republican members voting for other candidates or nine Republican members either voting present or not voting at all, for McCarthy to be elected as speaker. Bob Good of Virginia said that McCarthy "has not done anything to earn my vote", explaining that "[t]here's many times where we ... asked him to fight on various opportunities and various issues, and I have not seen the demonstrated fight that we're looking for." The Club for Growth, a conservative political advocacy group, openly called for House Republicans to oppose his nomination.

It was reported that these representatives demanded that McCarthy make concessions before they would support him, such as lowering the barriers for caucus members to force a vote to remove a sitting speaker and other procedural matters. Chip Roy of Texas became a leader in the negotiation process for the holdouts to McCarthy's speakership nomination. The goals that Roy and a group of about 20 Republicans included to bring down the threshold for calling a vote of no confidence against the speaker to one member, more enforcement to allow more time to read bills, a greater role for the House Freedom Caucus in Republican leadership, requiring Republican leadership to refrain from being involved in primary elections, and an end to U.S. aid to Ukraine.

=== Candidates ===
The following individuals received at least one vote in the election for speaker or expressed interest in serving in the role.

- Hakeem Jeffries of New York
- Kevin McCarthy of California
- Andy Biggs of Arizona
- Jim Jordan of Ohio
- Kevin Hern of Oklahoma
- Byron Donalds of Florida
- Donald Trump of Florida
- Justin Amash of Michigan
- Fred Upton of Michigan
- Jim Banks of Indiana
- Lee Zeldin of New York

=== Summary ===
On the first through the fourteenth votes, McCarthy failed to receive a majority of votes cast, while Jeffries received the support of all Democrats present on each ballot. Jim Jordan of Ohio received all votes of Republicans opposed to McCarthy on the second and third rounds. Following three unsuccessful votes on January 3, the House adjourned until noon on January 4. During the fourth vote, Roy nominated Byron Donalds of Florida, who replaced Jordan as the Republican alternative to McCarthy. In the fourth ballot until the eleventh ballot, Victoria Spartz of Indiana voted present, lowering the necessary threshold to 217 votes.

Following three more unsuccessful ballots on January 4, the House again adjourned until 8 pm the same day, then voted to adjourn again until noon on January 5. The House reconvened on January 5, and from the seventh to the eleventh ballots no candidate achieved a majority of the vote, making this the longest speaker election since that of December 1859 – February 1860. After initially voting to adjourn the proceedings until the following Monday, seconds before the voting to adjourn closed, McCarthy and his allies reversed their votes, which brought about a fifteenth ballot. On this fifteenth and final ballot, McCarthy received 50.5% of the votes cast for a candidate by name, as all four members-elect who had voted for other candidates on the fourteenth ballot voted present instead. McCarthy was elected speaker, and the early morning of January 7 marked the end of one of the highest number of ballots needed to elect a House Speaker in U.S. history.

In each round, Jeffries received the unanimous vote of every present Democrat. This marked the first speakership balloting since 2009 in which Democratic members voted unanimously for the House Democratic Caucuses' nominee.

=== Ballots 1–3 (January 3) ===
On the first ballot, Elise Stefanik of New York gave a nominating speech for McCarthy, Pete Aguilar of California nominated Jeffries, and Paul Gosar of Arizona nominated Andy Biggs. In total, 19 Republicans voted for candidates other than McCarthy, while Jeffries received the most votes of any candidate with all Democrats present voting in his favor. Since no nominee received an outright majority of the vote, a second ballot took place for the first time since the December 1923 U.S. speaker election.

On the second ballot, Jordan nominated McCarthy, Aguilar again nominated Jeffries, and Matt Gaetz of Florida nominated Jordan. The same 19 Republicans voted against McCarthy, this time coalescing their votes around Jordan. No candidate received an outright majority of the vote.

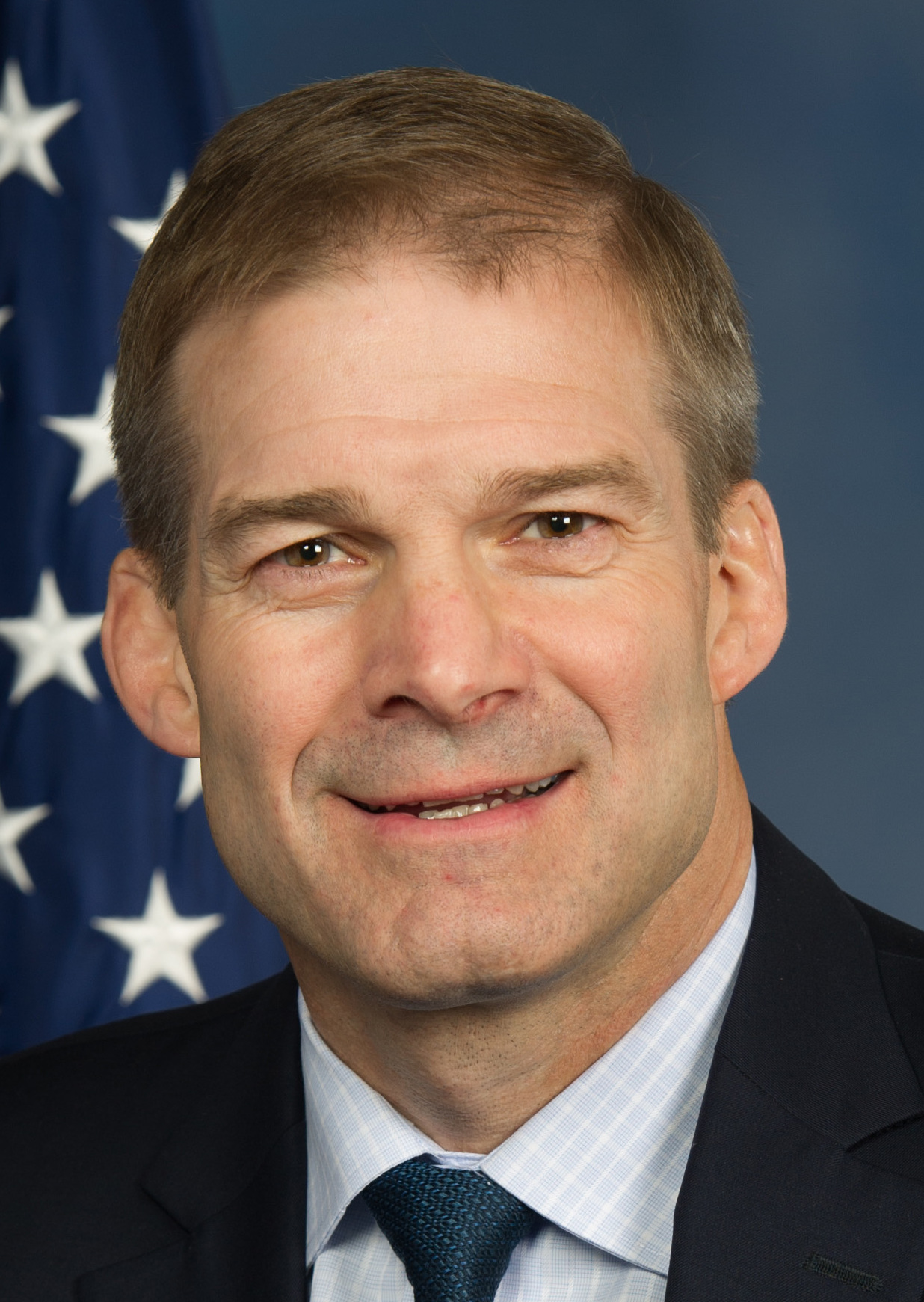
Jim Jordan of Ohio was nominated on the second and third ballots as anti-McCarthy Republicans coalesced their votes around him. He never voted for himself.

On the third ballot, Steve Scalise of Louisiana nominated McCarthy, Aguilar again nominated Jeffries, and Roy nominated Jordan. Jordan again voted for McCarthy, not for himself. Byron Donalds of Florida, who had voted for McCarthy on the first two ballots, instead voted for Jordan, increasing Jordan's vote total to 20. Donalds wrote on Twitter about his decision to change his vote, stating that "the reality is Rep. Kevin McCarthy doesn't have the votes."

After the third ballot, Tom Cole of Oklahoma moved to adjourn the meeting until 12:00 p.m. on January 4, and the motion was approved by voice vote.

January 2023 election for speaker (1st through 3rd ballots)
Party	Candidate	1st ballot		2nd ballot		3rd ballot	
Party	Candidate	Votes	%	Votes	%	Votes	%
Democratic	Hakeem Jeffries (NY 8)	212	48.8%	212	48.8%	212	48.8%
Republican	Kevin McCarthy (CA 20)	203	46.8%	203	46.8%	202	46.5%
Republican	Jim Jordan (OH 4)	6	1.4%	19	4.4%	20	4.6%
Republican	Andy Biggs (AZ 5)	10	2.3%	—N/a		—N/a	
Republican	Jim Banks (IN 3)	1	0.2%	—N/a		—N/a	
Republican	Byron Donalds (FL 19)	1	0.2%	—N/a		—N/a	
Republican	Lee Zeldin (Note: Zeldin, whose term as a House member had ended with the close of the 117th and previous Congress, was no longer an incumbent representative. He received one or more votes on this ballot without being formally nominated.)	1	0.2%	—N/a		—N/a	
Total votes		434	100%	434	100%	434	100%
Vacant		1	—N/a	1	—N/a	1	—N/a
Votes needed to win		218	>50%	218	>50%	218	>50%

=== Ballots 4–6 (January 4) ===
Ahead of the fourth ballot of voting on January 4, former president Donald Trump reaffirmed his support for McCarthy to be speaker of the House and urged all House Republicans to vote for him. Kat Cammack of Florida described those who did not vote for McCarthy as "the radical 2 percent". Ralph Norman of South Carolina, one of the Republicans opposed to McCarthy, stated that McCarthy would win over additional votes from the Republican holdouts by committing to shutting down the U.S. government over raising the United States debt ceiling.

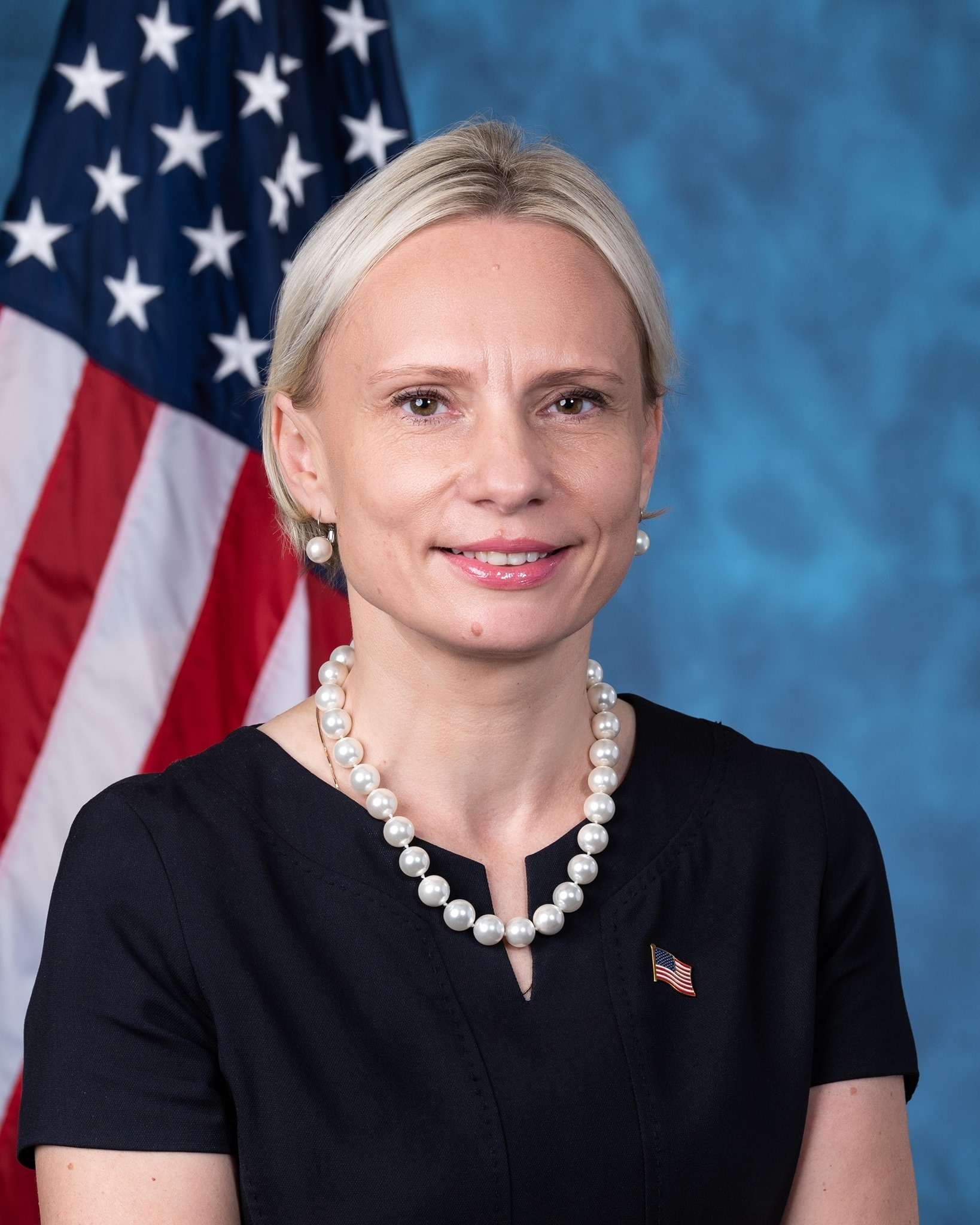
Victoria Spartz of Indiana voted present on the fourth through eleventh ballot, switching her vote from McCarthy.

After a quorum call, Wisconsin Republican Mike Gallagher nominated McCarthy, Aguilar again nominated Jeffries, and Roy nominated Byron Donalds. Despite Trump's endorsement, the 20 members who had voted for Jordan in the third ballot again opposed McCarthy, voting in this round for Donalds. Victoria Spartz, who had voted for McCarthy on each previous ballot, voted present. Spartz explained her vote of present as a message that more deliberations are needed.

On the fifth ballot, Warren Davidson of Ohio nominated McCarthy, Aguilar again nominated Jeffries, and Lauren Boebert of Colorado nominated Donalds. All members voted for the same candidates on the fifth ballot as they did on the fourth.

On the sixth ballot, Cammack nominated McCarthy, Aguilar again nominated Jeffries, and Scott Perry of Pennsylvania nominated Donalds. Prior to the ballot, Ken Buck of Colorado suggested to CNN that McCarthy should withdraw from consideration for Speaker if he could not reach a majority; he nonetheless voted again for McCarthy. All members voted for the same candidates on the sixth ballot as they did on the fourth and fifth.

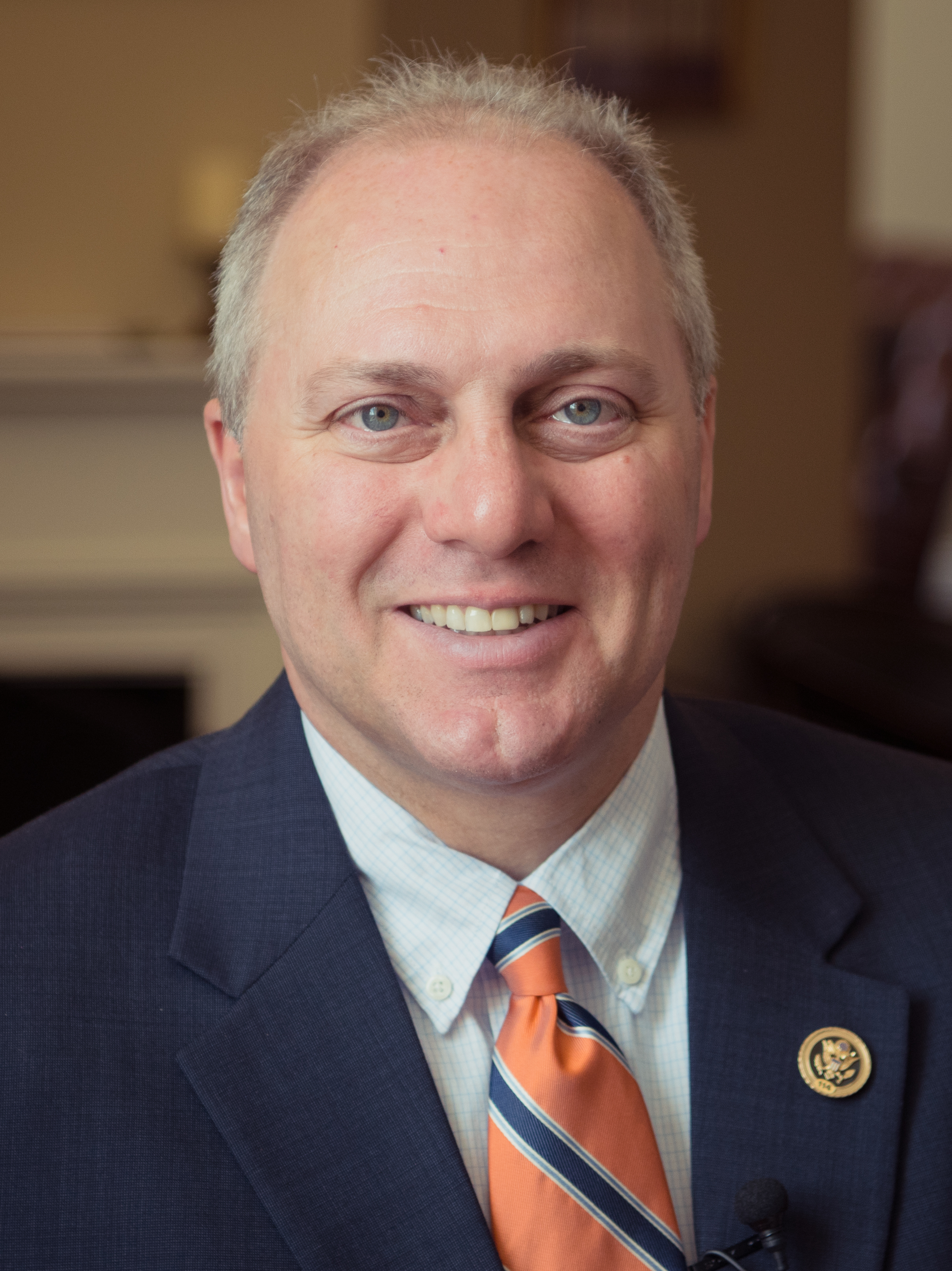
Following the sixth ballot, Steve Scalise of Louisiana was seen as a possible alternative to McCarthy.

The House agreed to adjourn until 8:00 p.m. the same day by voice vote. After reconvening at 8:00, the House agreed to adjourn again until 12:00 p.m. the next day, January 5, by a vote of 216–214. Of those who voted against adjournment, 210 were Democrats and four were Republicans: Biggs, Boebert, Gaetz, and Eli Crane of Arizona. Following the sixth ballot, Politico reported that Donalds was unlikely to be the final choice of the anti-McCarthy Republicans, with the chair of the Republican Study Committee, Kevin Hern of Oklahoma, being floated as a potential candidate. Pete Sessions of Texas also suggested that Republicans should begin to consider other speaker candidates, with Scalise, the House Majority Leader-elect, being specifically named.

Ahead of a seventh vote on the speakership, McCarthy offered several concessions, including allowing a single party member to motion for a vote to remove the speaker, appointing additional Freedom Caucus members to the House Rules Committee, and holding votes on bills concerning congressional term limits in the United States and border security. At the same time, the Congressional Leadership Fund, a super PAC aligned with McCarthy, reached an agreement with the Club for Growth not to spend money in the primary election of Republicans in open districts that are considered safe seats for the party.

January 2023 election for speaker (4th through 6th ballots)
Party	Candidate	4th ballot		5th ballot		6th ballot	
Party	Candidate	Votes	%	Votes	%	Votes	%
Democratic	Hakeem Jeffries (NY 8)	212	49.0%	212	49.0%	212	49.0%
Republican	Kevin McCarthy (CA 20)	201	46.4%	201	46.4%	201	46.4%
Republican	Byron Donalds (FL 19)	20	4.6%	20	4.6%	20	4.6%
Total votes		433	100%	433	100%	433	100%
Voted present		1	—N/a	1	—N/a	1	—N/a
Vacant		1	—N/a	1	—N/a	1	—N/a
Votes needed to win		217	>50%	217	>50%	217	>50%

=== Ballots 7–11 (January 5) ===
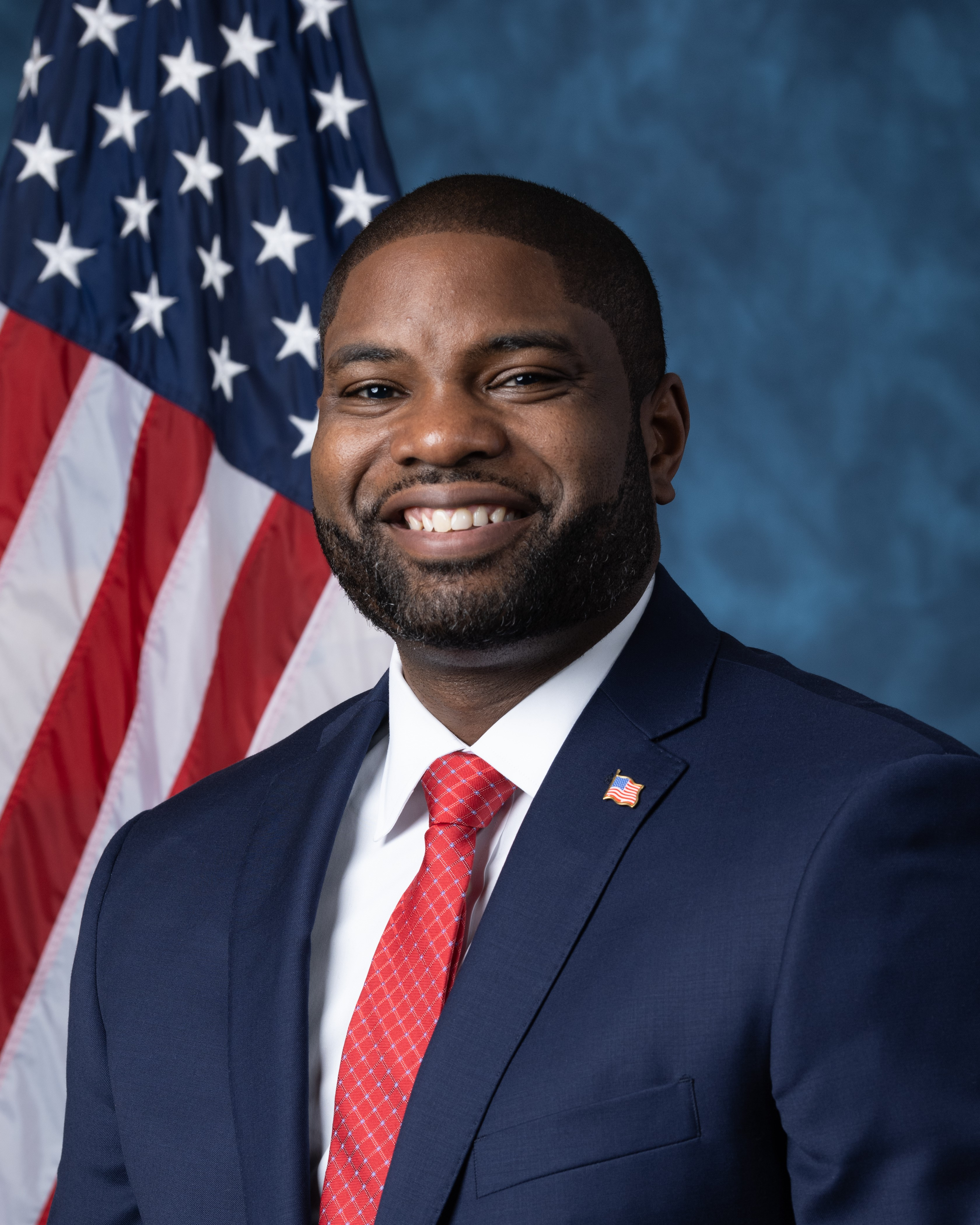
Byron Donalds of Florida was among those Republicans who were not nominated but received at least a vote on the first ballot; he was officially nominated from the fourth ballot and received at least a vote until the eleventh ballot.

On the seventh ballot, John James of Michigan nominated McCarthy, Aguilar again nominated Jeffries, and Dan Bishop of North Carolina nominated Donalds. Gaetz, who had voted for Donalds on the fourth, fifth, and sixth ballots, instead voted for Trump. All other members voted for the same candidates as they did on the fourth, fifth, and sixth ballots.

On the eighth ballot, Brian Mast of Florida nominated McCarthy, Katherine Clark of Massachusetts nominated Jeffries, and Biggs nominated Donalds. Boebert, as well as Josh Brecheen of Oklahoma, who had both previously supported Donalds, cast their votes for Hern, who was not formally nominated. All other members voted for the same candidates as they did on the seventh ballot.

On the ninth ballot, Troy Nehls of Texas nominated McCarthy, Ted Lieu of California nominated Jeffries, Matt Rosendale of Montana nominated Donalds, and Boebert nominated Hern. All members voted for the same candidates as they did on the eighth ballot, except Gaetz, who voted for Hern instead of Trump. Buck, who had been a McCarthy supporter, was absent from the vote and subsequent votes due to travel for a planned non-emergency medical procedure in Colorado.

On the tenth ballot, Juan Ciscomani of Arizona nominated McCarthy, Aguilar again nominated Jeffries, Anna Paulina Luna of Florida nominated Donalds, and Boebert again nominated Hern. Donalds continued as the main Republican opposition to McCarthy, while Hern was nominated for the ninth, tenth, and eleventh ballots, receiving as many as seven votes.

On the eleventh ballot, French Hill of Arkansas nominated McCarthy, Joe Neguse of Colorado nominated Jeffries, Gaetz nominated Trump, and Good nominated Hern. Once again, Donalds was the 3rd leading vote getter. After the ballot, the House voted 219−213 to adjourn until 12:00 p.m. on January 6. Tim Burchett of Tennessee joined all Democrats in voting against adjournment. McCarthy continued to negotiate with the Republican hardliners with further concessions, including seats on influential committees (such as the Rules Committee) and lowering the threshold to a single House member for triggering a vote on whether to unseat the speaker.

January 2023 election for speaker (7th through 11th ballots)
Party	Candidate	7th ballot		8th ballot		9th ballot		10th ballot		11th ballot	
Party	Candidate	Votes	%	Votes	%	Votes	%	Votes	%	Votes	%
Democratic	Hakeem Jeffries (NY 8)	212	49.0%	212	49.0%	212	49.1%	212	49.1%	212	49.1%
Republican	Kevin McCarthy (CA 20)	201	46.4%	201	46.4%	200	46.3%	200	46.3%	200	46.3%
Republican	Byron Donalds (FL 19)	19	4.4%	17	3.9%	17	3.9%	13	3.0%	12	2.8%
Republican	Kevin Hern (OK 1)	—N/a		2	0.5%	3	0.7%	7	1.6%	7	1.6%
Republican	Donald Trump	1	0.2%	1	0.2%	—N/a		—N/a		1	0.2%
Total votes		433	100%	433	100%	432	100%	432	100%	432	100%
Voted present		1	—N/a	1	—N/a	1	—N/a	1	—N/a	1	—N/a
Absent		0	—N/a	0	—N/a	1	—N/a	1	—N/a	1	—N/a
Vacant		1	—N/a	1	—N/a	1	—N/a	1	—N/a	1	—N/a
Votes needed to win		217	>50%	217	>50%	217	>50%	217	>50%	217	>50%

=== Ballots 12–15 (January 6) ===
When the House reconvened on January 6, (Note: The January 6 legislative day extended slightly into the calendar day of January 7.) Mike Garcia of California nominated McCarthy for the twelfth ballot. Jim Clyburn of South Carolina nominated Jeffries, Gaetz nominated Jordan, and Boebert again nominated Hern. On the twelfth ballot, 14 Republicans who had previously opposed McCarthy voted for him, while seven others voted for Jordan or Hern. Buck, David Trone of Maryland, and Wesley Hunt of Texas were absent. Buck and Trone were absent due to scheduled medical procedures; Hunt returned to Texas because his wife was in a hospital following the premature birth of their son. This ballot marked the first time McCarthy won a plurality of the votes, after receiving votes from 14 Republicans who had previously opposed his nomination; he nonetheless fell short of a majority.

On the thirteenth ballot, James Comer of Kentucky nominated McCarthy and Veronica Escobar of Texas nominated Jeffries. For the first time, there were no other nominations. Andy Harris of Maryland voted for McCarthy for the first time on this ballot. This left only six Republicans who did not vote for McCarthy. Trone, who was absent on the previous ballot due to undergoing shoulder surgery that morning, returned to the House to continue voting for Jeffries. Scalise then moved to adjourn until 10:00 p.m., in order to allow time for the two absent Republicans to return to Congress. The motion was adopted following a 220–212 vote split along party lines.

When the House reconvened at 10 p.m., Patrick McHenry of North Carolina nominated McCarthy and Aguilar again nominated Jeffries on the fourteenth ballot. Boebert and Gaetz voted present, Buck and Hunt returned to vote for McCarthy, and four Republicans voted against McCarthy, with two votes for Biggs and two votes for Jordan. McCarthy, who was one vote short of becoming speaker, approached Boebert and Gaetz on the floor and attempted unsuccessfully to convince them to vote for him. As Rogers was arguing with Gaetz, he had to be physically restrained by Richard Hudson of North Carolina. According to The New York Times, Gaetz was seeking a subcommittee chairmanship in the House Armed Services Committee, of which Rogers was in line to become chairman.

After a confrontation between McCarthy and Gaetz, 1:28 into the video, Richard Hudson of North Carolina is seen restraining Mike Rogers of Alabama from leaning towards Gaetz.

The House then proceeded to vote on a motion to adjourn until 12 p.m. on January 9, with McHenry making the motion to adjourn. The plan was to give time to convince the four Republicans who continued to vote for someone other than McCarthy on the 14th ballot to switch their votes to present in order to lower the threshold needed to elect a speaker. It was determined that the plan would not be able to yield a winner if executed on January 9 because a couple of Republicans were unable to attend the session on that day due to family obligations. Marjorie Taylor Greene of Georgia then called Donald Trump on her cell phone, and passed the phone around to the members-elect who continued to refuse to vote for McCarthy. The remaining holdout Republicans eventually agreed to switch their votes, and as a result many Republicans, including McCarthy, scrambled to change their vote from supporting adjournment to opposing it in hopes of a successful fifteenth ballot to take place immediately. As the vote to adjourn drew to a close, many members began to chant "One more time!" Due to the Republicans' switch, the motion failed 155−279, and the House remained in session; 67 Republicans were counted in opposition of adjournment, joined by all Democrats.

On the fifteenth ballot, Bruce Westerman of Arkansas nominated McCarthy and Dean Phillips of Minnesota nominated Jeffries. The final vote began at 11:50 p.m., and the threshold of 215 members present and voting needed for a majority (excluding those present and not voting) was reached at 12:29 a.m. With a majority of votes cast, McCarthy was elected speaker at 12:37 a.m. after the results were read by the clerk.

Following the election, Hal Rogers of Kentucky, the House dean, administered the oath of office to McCarthy as speaker, and McCarthy swore in all members of the House en masse. The House then agreed at 1:52 a.m. to adjourn until 5:00 p.m. on January 9 by voice vote, without any audible opposition.

January 2023 election for speaker (12th through 15th ballots)
Party	Candidate	12th ballot		13th ballot		14th ballot		15th ballot	
Party	Candidate	Votes	%	Votes	%	Votes	%	Votes	%
Republican	Kevin McCarthy (CA 20)	213	49.4%	214	49.5%	216	50.0%	216	50.5%
Democratic	Hakeem Jeffries (NY 8)	211	49.0%	212	49.1%	212	49.1%	212	49.5%
Republican	Jim Jordan (OH 4)	4	0.9%	6	1.4%	2	0.45%	—N/a	
Republican	Kevin Hern (OK 1)	3	0.7%	—N/a		—N/a		—N/a	
Republican	Andy Biggs (AZ 5)	—N/a		—N/a		2	0.45%	—N/a	
Total votes		431	100%	432	100%	432	100%	428	100%
Voted present		0	—N/a	0	—N/a	2	—N/a	6	—N/a
Absent		3	—N/a	2	—N/a	0	—N/a	0	—N/a
Vacant		1	—N/a	1	—N/a	1	—N/a	1	—N/a
Votes needed to win		216	>50%	217	>50%	217	>50%	215	>50%

=== All ballots: votes not cast for party nominee ===
All House members of the 118th Congress voted for their party's nominee on every ballot except as noted here.

Member	Party	District	Ballot vote cast														
Member	Party	District	January 3			January 4			January 5					January 6			
Member	Party	District	1	2	3	4	5	6	7	8	9	10	11	12	13	14	15
Andy Biggs	Republican	AZ 5	Biggs	Jordan		Donalds						Hern		Jordan			present
Dan Bishop	Republican	NC 8	Biggs	Jordan		Donalds								McCarthy			
Lauren Boebert	Republican	CO 3	Jordan			Donalds				Hern					Jordan	present	
Josh Brecheen	Republican	OK 2	Banks	Jordan		Donalds				Hern				McCarthy			
Ken Buck	Republican	CO 4	McCarthy								absent (Note: Buck missed votes due to a previously scheduled medical procedure.)					McCarthy	
Michael Cloud	Republican	TX 27	Jordan			Donalds								McCarthy			
Andrew Clyde	Republican	GA 9	Biggs	Jordan		Donalds								McCarthy			
Eli Crane	Republican	AZ 2	Biggs	Jordan		Donalds						Hern			Jordan	Biggs	present
Byron Donalds	Republican	FL 19	McCarthy		Jordan	Donalds								McCarthy			
Matt Gaetz	Republican	FL 1	Biggs	Jordan		Donalds			Trump		Hern		Trump	Jordan		present	
Bob Good	Republican	VA 5	Biggs	Jordan		Donalds							Hern	Jordan			present
Paul Gosar	Republican	AZ 9	Biggs	Jordan		Donalds								McCarthy			
Andy Harris	Republican	MD 1	Zeldin	Jordan		Donalds						Hern		Jordan	McCarthy		
Wesley Hunt	Republican	TX 38	McCarthy											absent (Note: Hunt missed votes to return home after his wife was readmitted to the hospital following the premature birth of their child earlier in the week.)		McCarthy	
Anna Paulina Luna	Republican	FL 13	Jordan			Donalds								McCarthy			
Mary Miller	Republican	IL 15	Jordan			Donalds								McCarthy			
Ralph Norman	Republican	SC 5	Biggs	Jordan		Donalds								McCarthy			
Andy Ogles	Republican	TN 5	Jordan			Donalds								McCarthy			
Scott Perry	Republican	PA 10	Biggs	Jordan		Donalds								McCarthy			
Matt Rosendale	Republican	MT 2	Biggs	Jordan		Donalds						Hern			Jordan	Biggs	present
Chip Roy	Republican	TX 21	Donalds	Jordan		Donalds								McCarthy			
Keith Self	Republican	TX 3	Jordan			Donalds								McCarthy			
Victoria Spartz	Republican	IN 5	McCarthy			present								McCarthy			
David Trone	Democratic	MD 6	Jeffries											absent (Note: Trone missed a vote due to a previously scheduled medical procedure.)	Jeffries		

=== All ballots: summary of votes ===
Democratic nominee
Republican nominee

Speaker ballot
Date	January 3			January 4			January 5					January 6			
Ballot	1st	2nd	3rd	4th	5th	6th	7th	8th	9th	10th	11th	12th	13th	14th	15th
Lee Zeldin	1														
Jim Banks	1														
Donald Trump							1				1				
Kevin Hern								2	3	7		3			
Byron Donalds	1			20			19	17		13	12				
Jim Jordan	6	19	20									4	6	2	
Andy Biggs	10													2	
Hakeem Jeffries	212											211	212		
Kevin McCarthy	203		202	201					200			213	214	216	216
Votes needed	218			217								216	217		215
Total votes	434			433					432			431	432		428
Present				1										2	6
Not voting									1			3	2		

== Impact ==
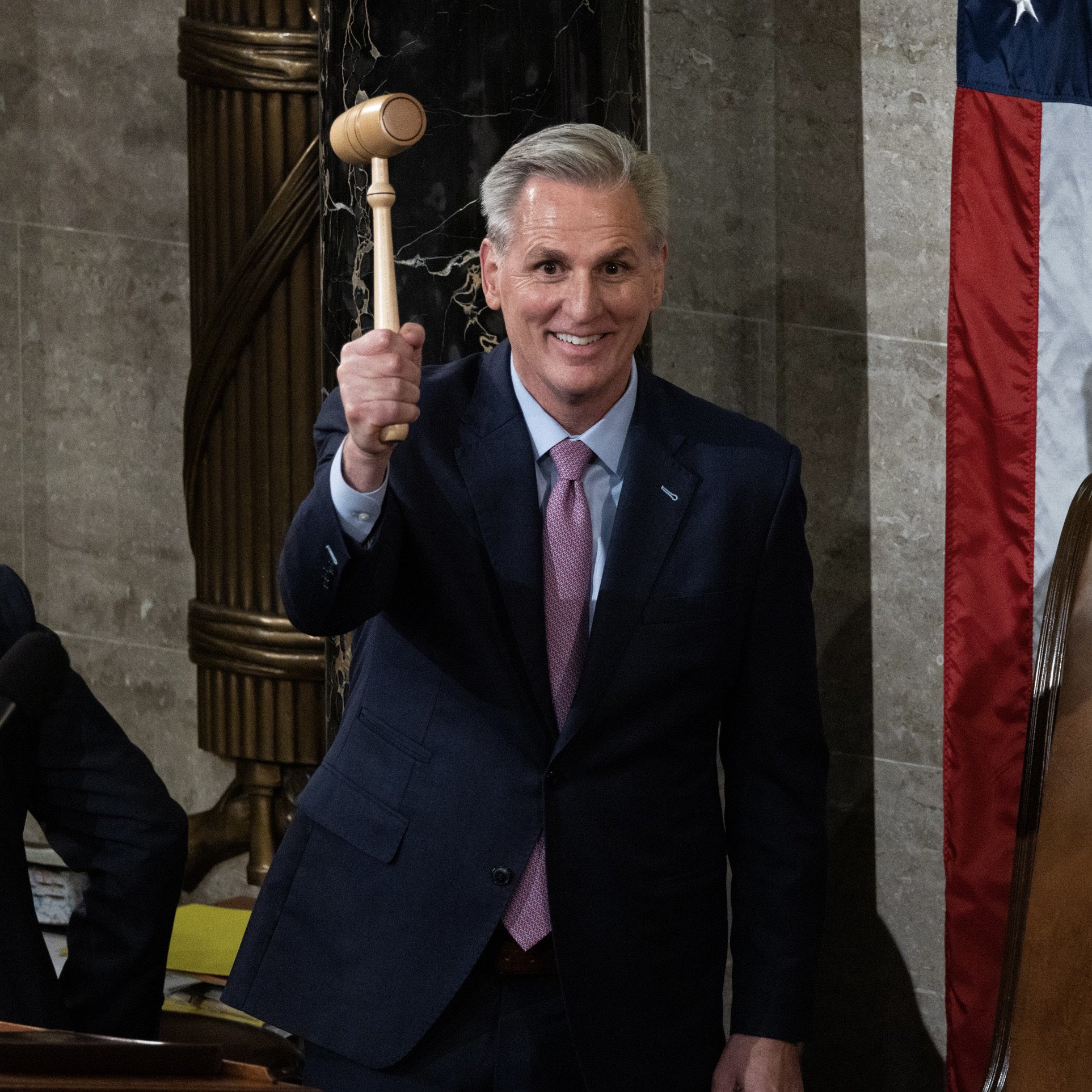
McCarthy holds the gavel following his election as Speaker of the House

=== Historical context ===
Thirteen of the fourteen prior U.S. speaker elections that took more than one ballot occurred before the American Civil War. The 68th Congress in 1923 was the last time it took more than one ballot to elect a speaker, and the 36th Congress in 1859 was the last time it took more than nine ballots to elect a speaker. The record number is 133 ballots during the 34th Congress in 1855, and this election had the fifth-highest number of ballots. In 2023, the election results and its length causing instability were widely reported by media around the world.

=== Consequences while there was no speaker ===
While the House was without a speaker, Congress could not pass bills or adopt resolutions. Incoming members could not set up their constituent services and were barred from accessing their security clearances. The speaker's place in the U.S. presidential line of succession was skipped, and the president pro tempore of the U.S. Senate (in 2023, Patty Murray of Washington) became second in the line after the vice president (Kamala Harris of California).

Moreover, the government of the District of Columbia was unable to enact any laws. Because the District of Columbia Home Rule Act specifies that laws passed by the district are subject to a congressional review period before becoming law, the district must hand-deliver physical copies of the laws to both the Senate's president pro tempore and the House's speaker. Therefore, with no speaker to receive the copies, the congressional review period could not begin.

=== C-SPAN popularity ===
C-SPAN, an American non-governmental cable and satellite television network that televises proceedings of the House, was approved before the speaker election to operate its cameras with its own staff, free of the restrictions by government employees who usually provide its feed. This deviation from its typical broadcast style captured members huddled and reaction shots that viewers do not normally see. C-SPAN aired extremely unlikely conversations between unaligned members, such as Gosar and Alexandria Ocasio-Cortez of New York, and focused on George Santos of New York, a newly elected Republican member accused of lying about much of his biography. The network saw increased popularity as it broadcast the election.

On January 8, Chip Roy, one of the Republicans who held out on voting for McCarthy, stated that C-SPAN's increased independence was a good thing and that he may be open to it being permanent. The restrictions traditionally placed upon C-SPAN went back into effect after the House established its rules. Matt Gaetz, another Republican holdout, introduced an amendment that would allow C-SPAN "to broadcast and record the floor proceedings of the House with not less than 4 cameras owned and operated by [them]". C-SPAN also submitted a formal petition to McCarthy to give it more independence. Democrat Maxwell Frost of Florida also announced his support for C-SPAN's requests.

== See also ==
- Removal of Kevin McCarthy as Speaker of the House
- 2022 Senate Republican Conference leadership election
