= 1974 in the United States =

- Decades: 1950s; 1960s; 1970s; 1980s; 1990s
- See also: History of the United States (1964–1980); Timeline of United States history (1970–1989); List of years in the United States

Events from the year 1974 in the United States.

== Incumbents ==
=== Federal government ===
- President:

Richard Nixon (R-California) (until August 9)
Gerald Ford (R-Michigan) (starting August 9)

- Vice President:

Gerald Ford (R-Michigan) (until August 9)
vacant (August 9 – December 19)
Nelson Rockefeller (R-New York) (starting December 19)

- Chief Justice: Warren E. Burger (Virginia)
- Speaker of the House of Representatives: Carl Albert (D-Oklahoma)
- Senate Majority Leader: Mike Mansfield (D-Montana)
- Congress: 93rd

==== State governments ====
Governors and lieutenant governors

=== Governors ===
- Governor of Alabama: George Wallace (Democratic)
- Governor of Alaska: William A. Egan (Democratic) (until December 2), Jay Hammond (Republican) (starting December 2)
- Governor of Arizona: Jack Richard Williams (Republican)
- Governor of Arkansas: Dale Bumpers (Democratic)
- Governor of California: Ronald Reagan (Republican)
- Governor of Colorado: John David Vanderhoof (Republican)
- Governor of Connecticut: Thomas J. Meskill (Republican)
- Governor of Delaware: Sherman W. Tribbitt (Democratic)
- Governor of Florida: Reubin Askew (Democratic)
- Governor of Georgia: Jimmy Carter (Democratic)
- Governor of Hawaii: John A. Burns (Democratic) (until December 2), George Ariyoshi (Democratic) (starting December 2)
- Governor of Idaho: Cecil D. Andrus (Democratic)
- Governor of Illinois: Dan Walker (Democratic)
- Governor of Indiana: Otis R. Bowen (Republican)
- Governor of Iowa: Robert D. Ray (Republican)
- Governor of Kansas: Robert Docking (Democratic)
- Governor of Kentucky: Wendell H. Ford (Democratic) (until December 28), Julian M. Carroll (Democratic) (starting December 28)
- Governor of Louisiana: Edwin W. Edwards (Democratic)
- Governor of Maine: Kenneth M. Curtis (Democratic)
- Governor of Maryland: Marvin Mandel (Democratic)
- Governor of Massachusetts: Francis W. Sargent (Republican)
- Governor of Michigan: William Milliken (Republican)
- Governor of Minnesota: Wendell R. Anderson (Democratic)
- Governor of Mississippi: Bill Waller (Democratic)
- Governor of Missouri: Kit Bond (Republican)
- Governor of Montana: Thomas Lee Judge (Democratic)
- Governor of Nebraska: J. James Exon (Democratic)
- Governor of Nevada: Mike O'Callaghan (Democratic)
- Governor of New Hampshire: Meldrim Thomson Jr. (Republican)
- Governor of New Jersey: William T. Cahill (Republican) (until January 15), Brendan Byrne (Democratic) (starting January 15)
- Governor of New Mexico: Bruce King (Democratic)
- Governor of New York: Malcolm Wilson (Republican) (until end of December 31)
- Governor of North Carolina: James Holshouser (Republican)
- Governor of North Dakota: Arthur A. Link (Democratic)
- Governor of Ohio: John J. Gilligan (Democratic)
- Governor of Oklahoma: David Hall (Democratic)
- Governor of Oregon: Tom McCall (Republican)
- Governor of Pennsylvania: Milton Shapp (Democratic)
- Governor of Rhode Island: Philip W. Noel (Democratic)
- Governor of South Carolina: John C. West (Democratic)
- Governor of South Dakota: Richard F. Kneip (Democratic)
- Governor of Tennessee: Winfield Dunn (Republican)
- Governor of Texas: Dolph Briscoe (Democratic)
- Governor of Utah: Cal Rampton (Democratic)
- Governor of Vermont: Thomas P. Salmon (Democratic)
- Governor of Virginia: A. Linwood Holton Jr. (Republican) (until January 12), Mills E. Godwin Jr. (Republican) (starting January 12)
- Governor of Washington: Daniel J. Evans (Republican)
- Governor of West Virginia: Arch A. Moore Jr. (Republican)
- Governor of Wisconsin: Patrick J. Lucey (Democratic)
- Governor of Wyoming: Stanley K. Hathaway (Republican)

=== Lieutenant governors ===
- Lieutenant Governor of Alabama: Jere Beasley (Democratic)
- Lieutenant Governor of Alaska: H. A. Boucher (Democratic) (until December 2), Lowell Thomas Jr. (Republican) (starting December 2)
- Lieutenant Governor of Arkansas: Bob C. Riley (Democratic)
- Lieutenant Governor of California: Edwin Reinecke (Republican) (until October 4), John L. Harmer (Republican) (starting October 4)
- Lieutenant Governor of Colorado: Ted L. Strickland (Republican)
- Lieutenant Governor of Connecticut: Peter L. Cashman (Republican)
- Lieutenant Governor of Delaware: Eugene Bookhammer (Republican)
- Lieutenant Governor of Florida: Thomas Burton Adams Jr. (Democratic)
- Lieutenant Governor of Georgia: Lester Maddox (Democratic)
- Lieutenant Governor of Hawaii: George Ariyoshi (Democratic) (until December 2), Nelson Doi (Democratic) (starting December 2)
- Lieutenant Governor of Idaho: Jack M. Murphy (Democratic)
- Lieutenant Governor of Illinois: Neil Hartigan (Democratic)
- Lieutenant Governor of Indiana: Robert D. Orr (Republican)
- Lieutenant Governor of Iowa: Arthur A. Neu (Republican)
- Lieutenant Governor of Kansas: Dave Owen (Republican)
- Lieutenant Governor of Kentucky: Julian Carroll (Democratic) (until December 28), vacant (starting December 28)
- Lieutenant Governor of Louisiana: Jimmy Fitzmorris (Democratic)
- Lieutenant Governor of Maryland: Blair Lee III (political party unknown)
- Lieutenant Governor of Massachusetts: Donald R. Dwight (Republican)
- Lieutenant Governor of Michigan: James H. Brickley (Republican)
- Lieutenant Governor of Minnesota: Rudy Perpich (Democratic)
- Lieutenant Governor of Mississippi: William F. Winter (Democratic)
- Lieutenant Governor of Missouri: William C. Phelps (Republican)
- Lieutenant Governor of Montana: Bill Christiansen (Democratic)
- Lieutenant Governor of Nebraska: Frank Marsh (Democratic)
- Lieutenant Governor of Nevada: Harry Reid (Democratic)
- Lieutenant Governor of New Mexico: Roberto Mondragón (Democratic)
- Lieutenant Governor of New York: Warren M. Anderson (Republican) (until end of December 31)
- Lieutenant Governor of North Carolina: Jim Hunt (Democratic)
- Lieutenant Governor of North Dakota: Wayne G. Sanstead (Democratic)
- Lieutenant Governor of Ohio: John William Brown (Republican)
- Lieutenant Governor of Oklahoma: George Nigh (Democratic)
- Lieutenant Governor of Pennsylvania: Ernest P. Kline (Democratic)
- Lieutenant Governor of Rhode Island: J. Joseph Garrahy (Democratic)
- Lieutenant Governor of South Carolina: Earle Morris Jr. (Democratic)
- Lieutenant Governor of South Dakota: William Dougherty (Democratic)
- Lieutenant Governor of Tennessee: John S. Wilder (Democratic)
- Lieutenant Governor of Texas: William P. Hobby Jr. (Democratic)
- Lieutenant Governor of Vermont: John S. Burgess (Republican)
- Lieutenant Governor of Virginia: Henry Howell (Democratic) (until January 12), John N. Dalton (Republican) (starting January 12)
- Lieutenant Governor of Washington: John Cherberg (Democratic)
- Lieutenant Governor of Wisconsin: Martin J. Schreiber (Democratic)

== Events ==
=== January ===
- January 4
  - Citing executive privilege, President Richard Nixon refuses to surrender 500 tapes and documents which have been subpoenaed by the Senate Watergate Committee.
  - Joni Lenz is attacked in her bedroom by serial killer Ted Bundy in Washington; she survives.
- January 6 – In response to the energy crisis, Daylight Saving Time commences nearly four months early in the United States.
- January 13 – The Miami Dolphins repeat as National Football League champions, routing the Minnesota Vikings 24–7 in Super Bowl VIII.
- January 15 – Happy Days, a sitcom about life in the 1950s, debuts on ABC.
- January 19 – In college (men's) basketball, Notre Dame defeats UCLA 71–70, ending the Bruins' record 88-game winning streak.
- January 30 – In his State of the Union Address, President Nixon declares, "One year of Watergate is enough."

=== February ===
- February 4 – Newspaper heiress Patricia Hearst is kidnapped from her Berkeley, California apartment by members of the Symbionese Liberation Army.
- February 8 – After a record 84 days in orbit, the crew of Skylab 4 returns to Earth.
- February 12 – U.S. District Court Judge Geoerge Boldt rules that Native American tribes in Washington state are entitled to half of the legal salmon and steelhead catches, based on treaties signed by the tribes and the U.S. government.
- February 22 – Samuel Byck attempts to hijack an airplane with the intent to crash it into the White House and assassinate President Nixon. He commits suicide when police storm the plane.
- February 28 – Egypt and the United States re-establish normal diplomatic relations.

=== March ===
- March 1 – Watergate scandal: Seven former White House officials are indicted for their role in the Watergate break-in and charged with conspiracy to obstruct justice.
- March 4 – People magazine's first issue is published in the U.S., with Mia Farrow on the cover.
- March 18
  - Oil embargo crisis: Most OPEC nations end a 5-month oil embargo against the United States, Europe and Japan.
  - After 23 consecutive years on television, Lucille Ball appears in the finale of Here's Lucy.
- March 19 – First recorded crime, a ransacking in Visalia, California, definitely attributable to Joseph James DeAngelo, at this time a police officer, who will commit at least 13 murders, 51 rapes and 120 burglaries up to 1986; he will not be arrested until 2018.
- March 29 – Mariner 10 approaches Mercury.
- March 30 – North Carolina State defeats UCLA in the semifinals of the 1974 NCAA Division I Basketball Tournament, ending the Bruins' record run of seven consecutive national championships.

=== April ===
- April 2 – The 46th Academy Awards ceremony, hosted by Burt Reynolds, Diana Ross, John Huston and David Niven, is held at Dorothy Chandler Pavilion in Los Angeles. George Roy Hill's The Sting wins seven awards, including Best Picture and Best Director for Hill. The film is tied with William Friedkin's The Exorcist in receiving ten nominations.
- April 3 – The 1974 Super Outbreak, at the time the largest series of tornadoes in history, occurs in 13 U.S. states and one Canadian province, leaving over 300 people dead, over 5,000 people injured, and hundreds of millions of dollars in damage.
- April 4 – Hank Aaron ties Babe Ruth for the all-time home run record with his 714th at Riverfront Stadium in Cincinnati.
- April 6 – California Jam is held at the Ontario Motor Speedway in Ontario, California, attracting 250,000 fans.
- April 8 – Hank Aaron of the Atlanta Braves breaks Babe Ruth's home run record, by hitting his 715th career home run off of a pitch by Los Angeles Dodgers' Al Downing at Atlanta–Fulton County Stadium.
- April 15 – In San Francisco, members of the Symbionese Liberation Army rob a branch of the Hibernia Bank, joined by Patricia Hearst.
- April 20 – Voters in Louisiana approve a new state constitution, replacing a 225,000-word document which had first been adopted in 1921.
- April 22 – Hi-Fi Murders: Five people are brutally tortured by a group of men during a robbery at a home audio store in Ogden, Utah, resulting in three deaths.

=== May ===
- May 4 – The Expo '74 World's Fair opens in Spokane, Washington.
- May 9 – The House of Representatives Judiciary Committee opens formal hearings in the impeachment process against Richard Nixon.
- May 12 – The Boston Celtics win their 12th National Basketball Association championship, defeating the Milwaukee Bucks 102–87 in the decisive game of the World Championship Series.
- May 17 – Los Angeles police raid Symbionese Liberation Army headquarters, killing six members, including Camilla Hall and SLA leader Donald DeFreeze.
- May 18 – Heaven's Gate, an American millenarian New Age religious group, is founded by Marshall Applewhite and Bonnie Nettles.
- May 19 – The Philadelphia Flyers defeat the Boston Bruins, thereby becoming the first expansion team to win the Stanley Cup.
- May 30
  - Johnny Rutherford wins the first of three Indianapolis 500 automobile races.
  - NASA's ATS-6 satellite is launched.
- May – Bavarian Autosport is founded in Stratham, New Hampshire.

=== June ===
- June 4 – The Cleveland Indians stage an ill-advised Ten Cent Beer Night for a game against the Texas Rangers at Cleveland Municipal Stadium. Cleveland forfeits after alcohol-fueled mayhem and violence spreads from the stands onto the field.
- June 26 – The Universal Product Code is scanned for the first time, to sell a package of Wrigley's chewing gum at the Marsh Supermarket in Troy, Ohio.
- June 29 – America Sings attraction opens to the public for the first time at Disneyland in Anaheim, California.
- June 30 – Alberta Williams King, mother of the late Martin Luther King Jr., is killed during a church service in Atlanta, Georgia.

=== July ===
- July 1 – Six Flags Great Adventure opens for the first time.
- July 8 – Two weeks after the attraction's opening, an 18-year-old employee is crushed to her death while working on America Sings at Disneyland. This is the first employee fatality at a Disney Park.
- July 11–17 – Baltimore police strike.
- July 14 – In Issaquah, Washington, serial killer Ted Bundy abducts Janice Ott and Denise Naslund in broad daylight at Lake Sammamish State Park.
- July 15 – Christine Chubbuck, television presenter for WXLT-TV Sarasota, Florida, draws a revolver and shoots herself in the head during a live broadcast. She dies in a hospital 14 hours later, the first person to commit suicide on live television.
- July 16 – Elmer Wayne Henley is sentenced to life imprisonment for assisting Dean Corll in murdering 28 Texas boys from 1970 to 1973.
- July 24 – Watergate scandal – United States v. Nixon: The Supreme Court rules 8–0 with one abstention that President Richard Nixon cannot withhold subpoenaed White House tapes, and orders him to surrender them to the Watergate special prosecutor.
- July 27–30 – Watergate scandal: The House of Representatives Judiciary Committee adopts three articles of impeachment, charging President Nixon with obstruction of justice, failure to uphold laws, and refusal to produce material subpoenaed by the committee.

=== August ===
August 9: Richard Nixon resigns as President of the United States

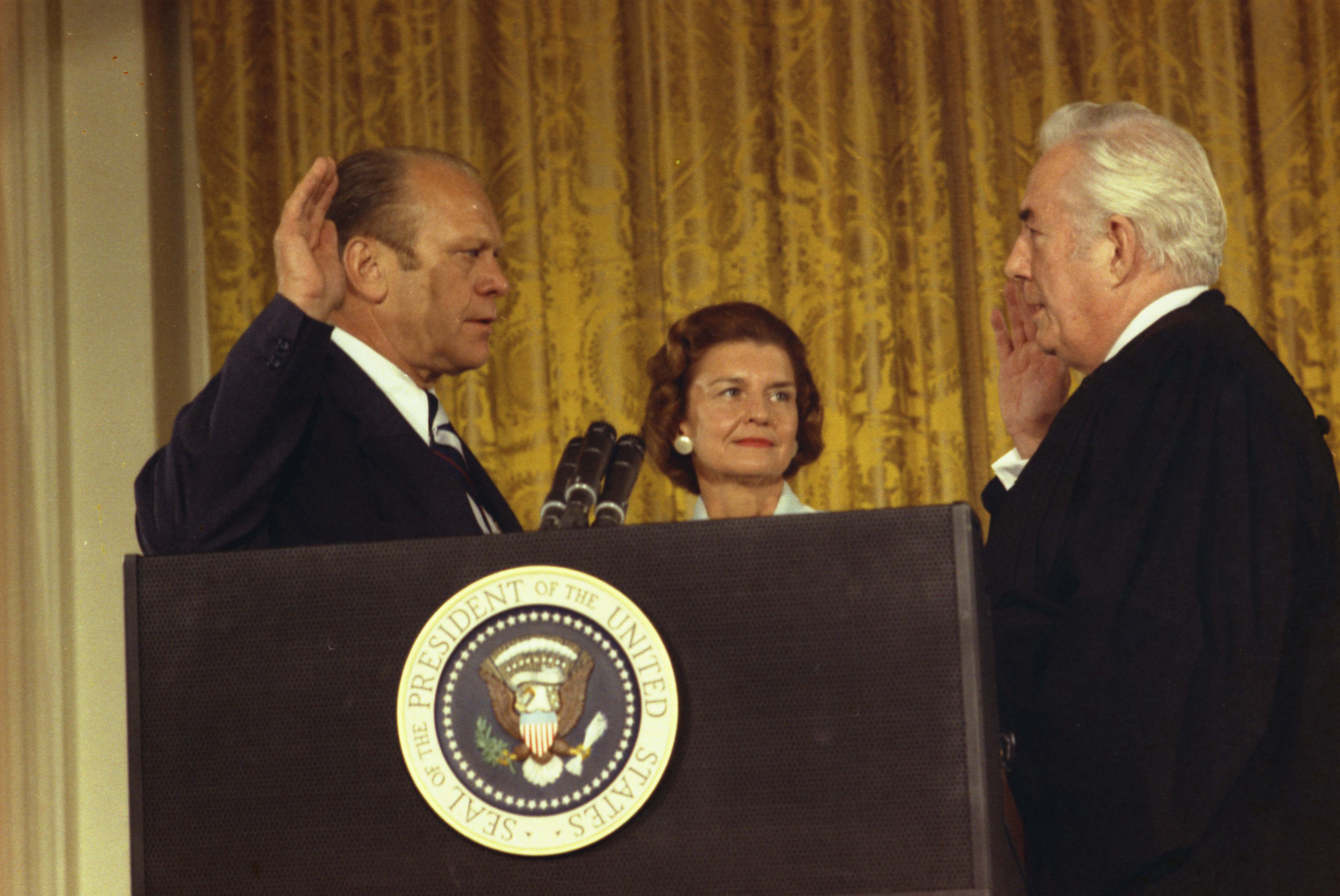
August 9: Gerald Ford is sworn in as the 38th U.S. president

Nixon Oval Office meeting with H.R. Haldeman "Smoking Gun" Conversation June 23, 1972 Full Transcript

- August 5 – Watergate scandal: The "smoking gun" tape of June 23, 1972, is revealed, in which President Richard Nixon and White House Chief of Staff H.R. Haldeman discuss using the Central Intelligence Agency to block a Federal Bureau of Investigation inquiry into Watergate. Nixon's support in Congress collapses.
- August 7
  - Three Republican congressional leaders (Barry Goldwater, Hugh Scott and John Rhodes) visit President Nixon in the White House. They inform him that he lacks the votes to escape impeachment in the House of Representatives and conviction in the Senate. Goldwater urges Nixon to resign.
  - French acrobat Philippe Petit walks across a high wire slung between the twin towers of the World Trade Center in New York.
- August 8 – Watergate scandal: President Nixon announces his resignation (effective August 9).
- August 9 – Richard Nixon becomes the first president of the United States to resign from office, an action taken to avoid being removed by impeachment and conviction in response to his role in the Watergate scandal. Vice President Gerald R. Ford becomes the 38th president upon Nixon's resignation, taking the oath of office in the East Room of the White House.
- August 30 – Public Law 93-400 is enacted, establishing the Office of Federal Procurement Policy (see Federal Acquisition Regulation).

=== September ===
- September 1 – Daredevil Bob Gill fails a world-record attempt to jump Appalachia Lake in West Virginia.
- September 8
  - Watergate scandal: President Gerald Ford pardons former President Richard Nixon for any crimes Nixon may have committed while in office.
  - Stuntman Evel Knievel fails in his attempt to rocket across the Snake River Canyon in Idaho.
- September 16 – In Newport, Rhode Island, America's Cup defender "Courageous", skippered by Ted Hood, wins over Australian challenger "Southern Cross".

=== October ===
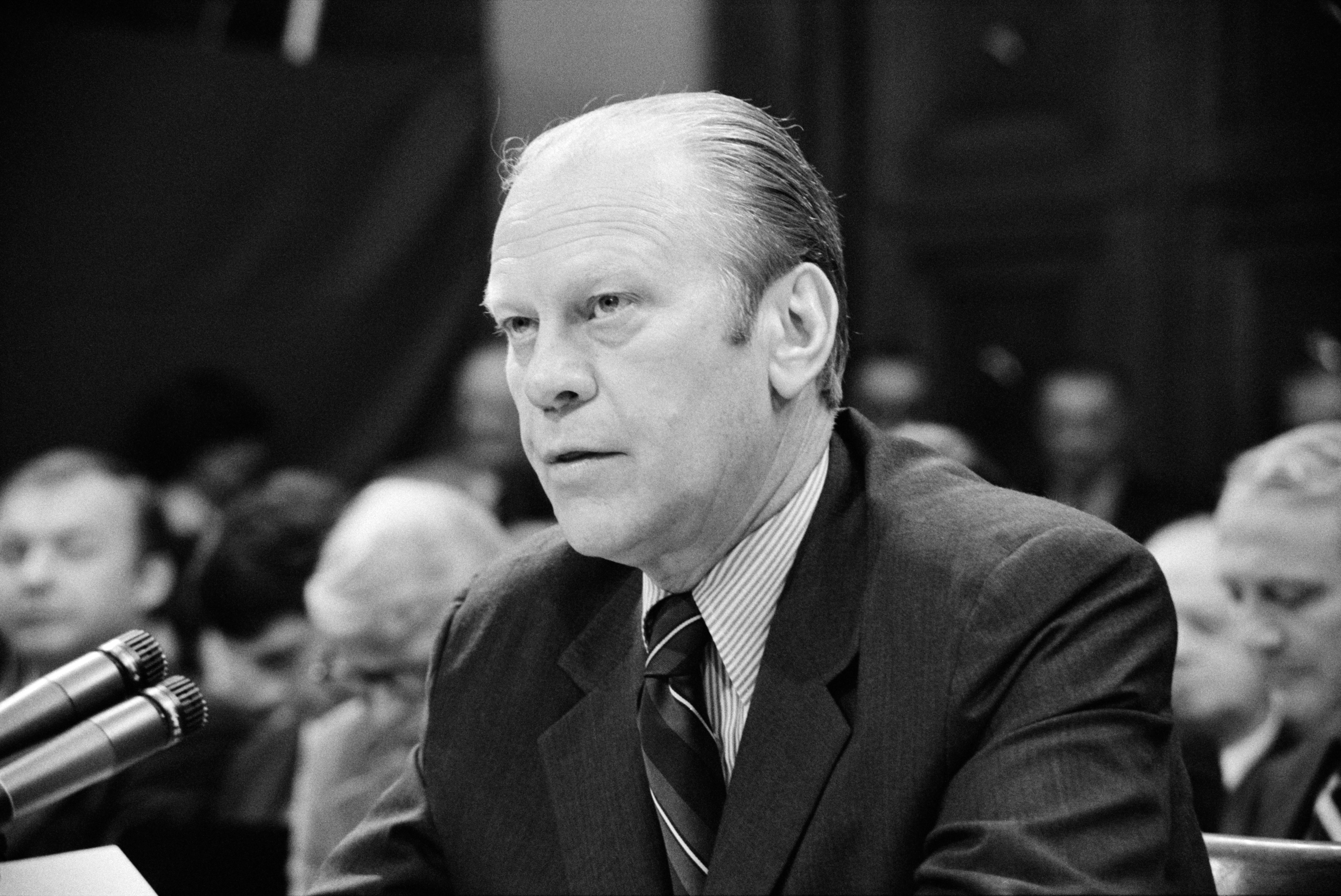
October 17: President Ford testifies before the House Judiciary Subcommittee regarding his pardon of Nixon

- October 2 – U.S. release of film The Taking of Pelham One Two Three, directed by Joseph Sargent and starring Walter Matthau, Robert Shaw, Martin Balsam and Jerry Stiller.
- October 8 – Franklin National Bank collapses due to fraud and mismanagement (the largest bank failure at that time in the history of the United States).
- October 15 – President Gerald Ford signs a federal campaign reform bill, which sets new regulations in the wake of the Watergate scandal.
- October 17
  - President Gerald Ford voluntarily appears before Congress to give sworn testimony—the only time a sitting president has done so—about the pardon of Richard Nixon.
  - The Oakland Athletics win their third consecutive Major League Baseball championship, defeating the Los Angeles Dodgers in five games in the World Series.
- October 30 – "The Rumble in the Jungle" takes place in Kinshasa, Zaire, where Muhammad Ali knocks out George Foreman in 8 rounds to regain the Heavyweight title, which had been stripped from him 7 years earlier.

=== November ===
- November 5 – Democrats make significant gains in the U.S. Congressional midterm elections, as the Republican Party suffers losses over the Watergate scandal.
- November 8 – In Salt Lake City, Utah, Carol DaRonch narrowly escapes abduction by serial killer Ted Bundy. She goes on to testify against him at his trial.
- November 13 – Ronald DeFeo Jr. murders his family in Amityville, New York.
- November 20 – The United States Department of Justice files its final antitrust suit against AT&T. This suit later leads to the breakup of AT&T and the Bell System.

=== December ===
- December 4 – The Pioneer 11 probe passes Jupiter and captures famous images of the Great Red Spot.

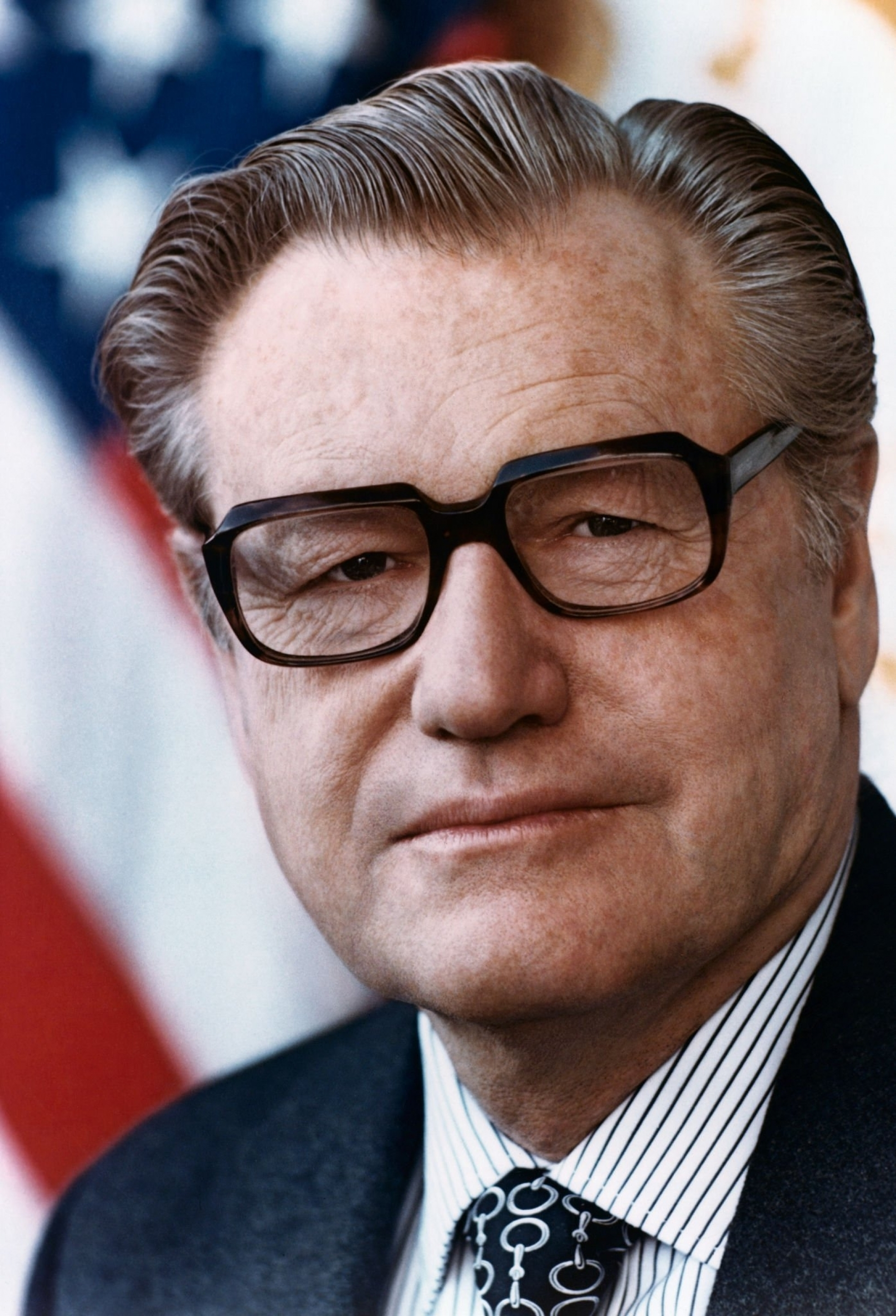
December 19: Nelson Rockefeller becomes the 41st U.S. vice president

- December 10 – United States Senate confirms Nelson Rockefeller as vice president.
- December 19 – United States House of Representatives confirms Rockefeller as Vice President of the United States. He is sworn that evening.
- December 21 – The New York Times reveals illegal domestic spying by the CIA.
- December 23 – Former British government minister John Stonehouse, who faked his drowning in Florida, is arrested in Melbourne, Australia.
- December 31 – Restrictions on holding private gold within the United States, implemented by Franklin Roosevelt in 1933, are removed.

=== Undated ===
- Dungeons & Dragons fantasy tabletop role-playing game, designed by Gary Gygax and Dave Arneson, is first released, in the United States.
- The 1960s Milgram experiment is extensively described by Harvard University psychologist Stanley Milgram in his book Obedience to Authority; An Experimental View.
- Volkswagen's Golf automobile (known in the US as the Rabbit) first enters production, as the replacement for well-loved but antiquated Beetle. VW goes on to sell more than 22 million Golfs, and the model, now in its 5th generation, is still in full-scale production as of 2008.
- Monty Python's Flying Circus is first broadcast in the United States on the PBS member station KERA-TV.
- PepsiCo becomes the first American company to sell products in the Soviet Union.
- Women's Center of Rhode Island is founded.

=== Ongoing ===
- Cold War (1947–1991)
- Space Race (1957–1975)
- Détente (c. 1969–1979)
- Watergate scandal (1972–1974)
- Capital punishment suspended by Furman v. Georgia (1972–1976)
- 1973 oil crisis (1973–1974)
- 1970s energy crisis (1973–1980)
- DOCUMERICA photography project (1972–1977)

== Births ==
=== January ===
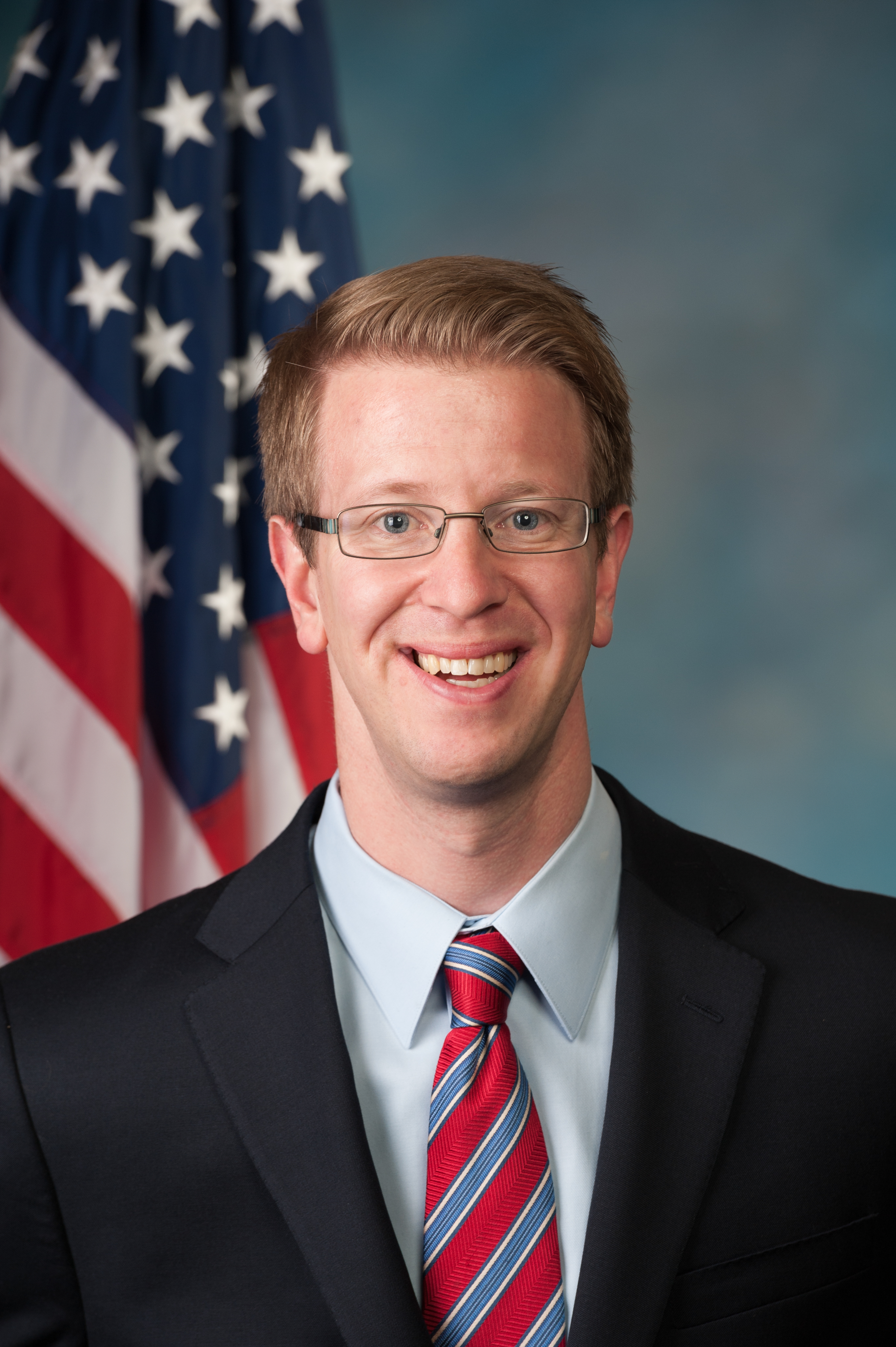
Derek Kilmer

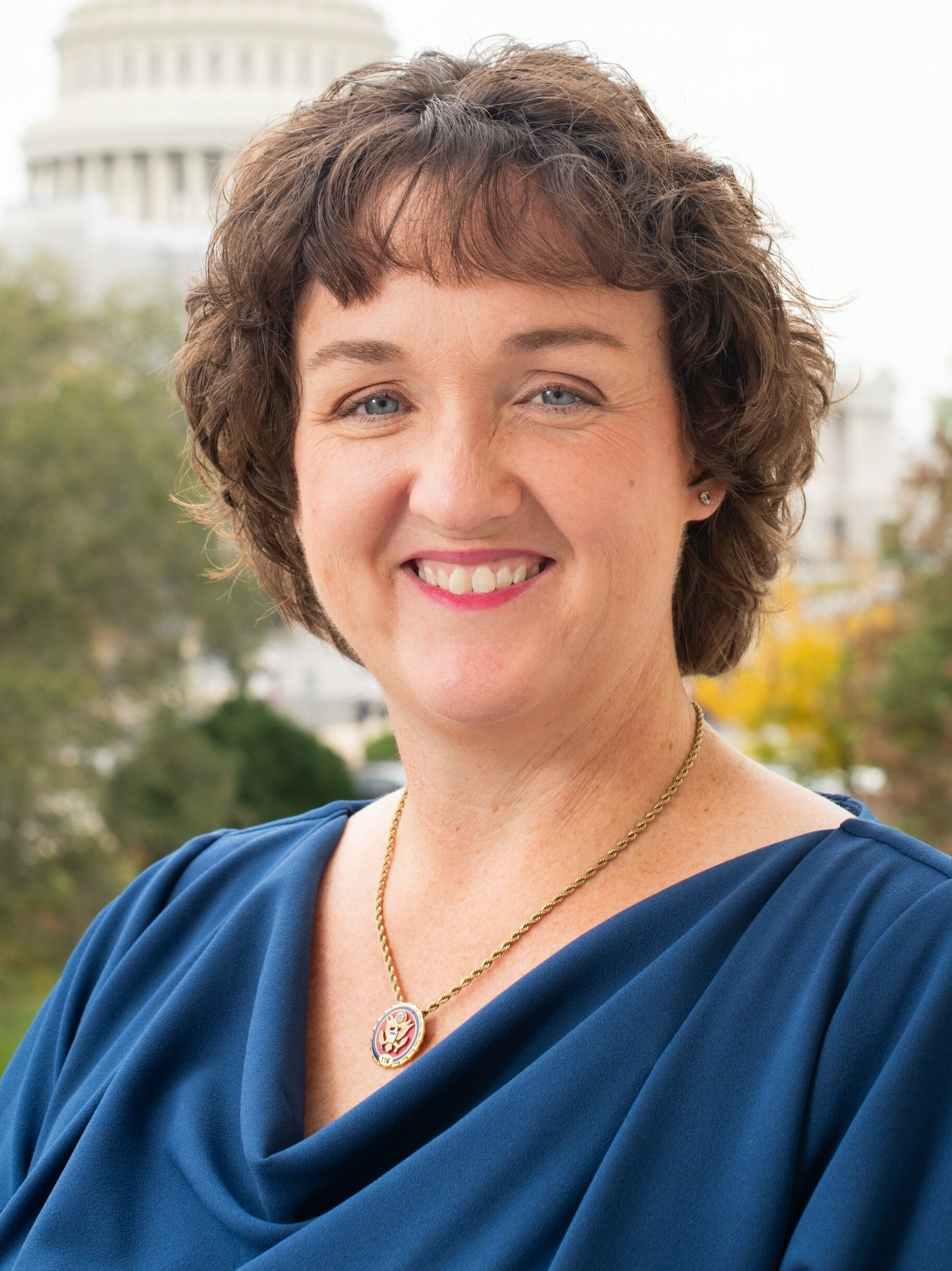
Katie Porter

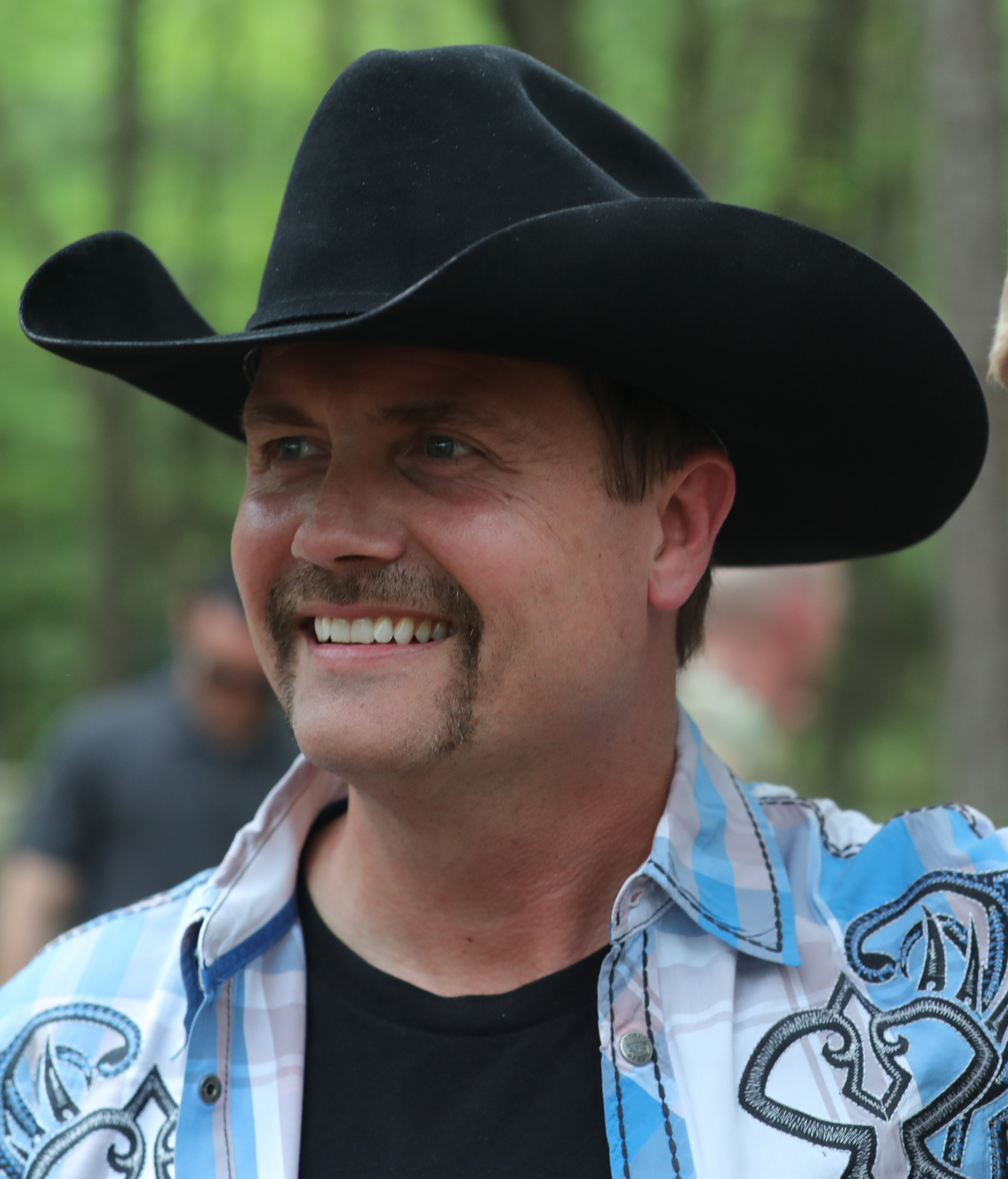
John Rich

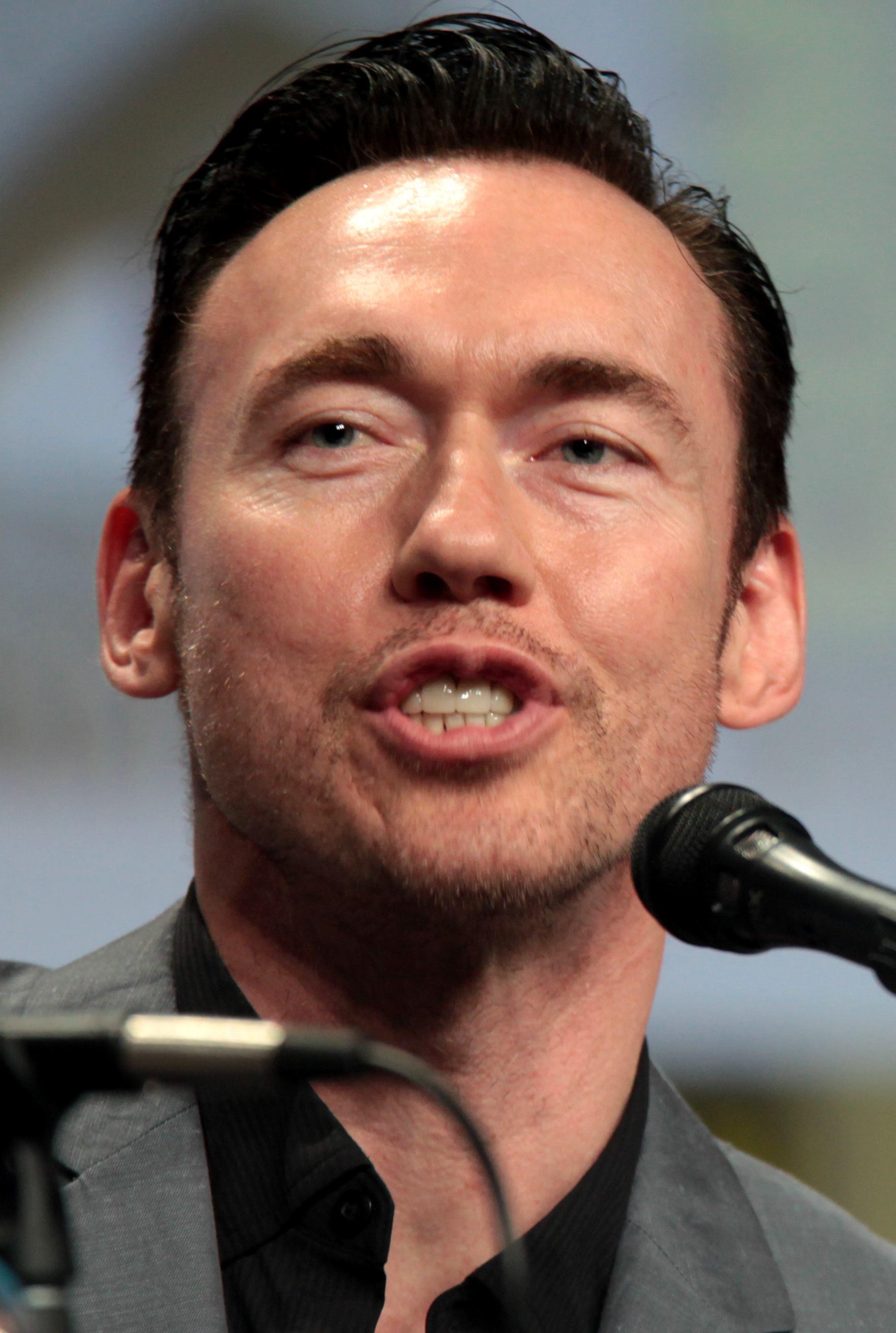
Kevin Durand

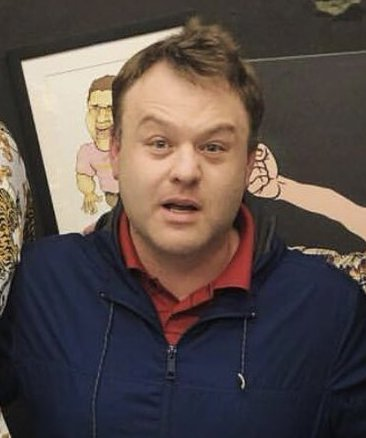
Frank Caliendo

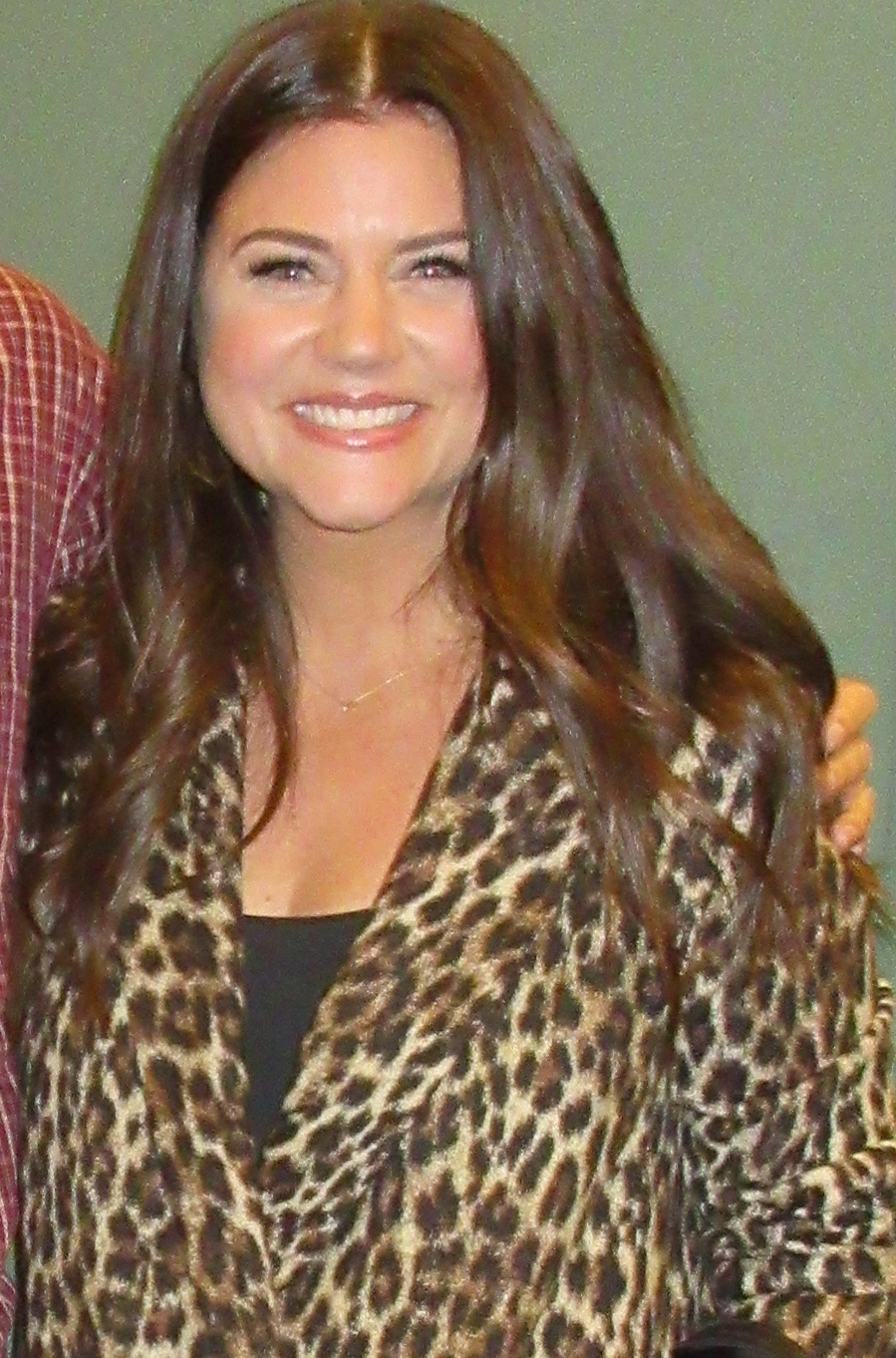
Tiffani Thiessen

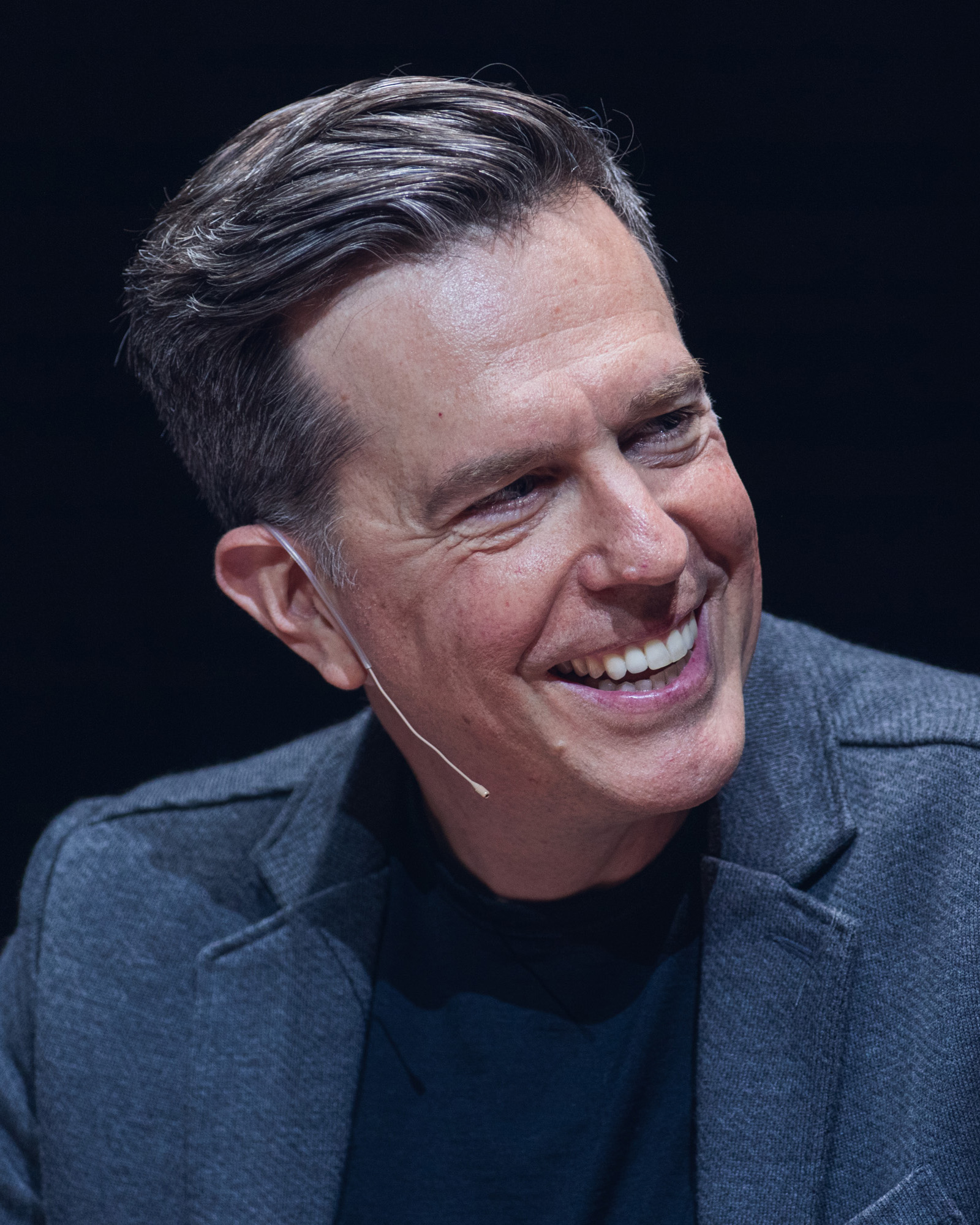
Ed Helms

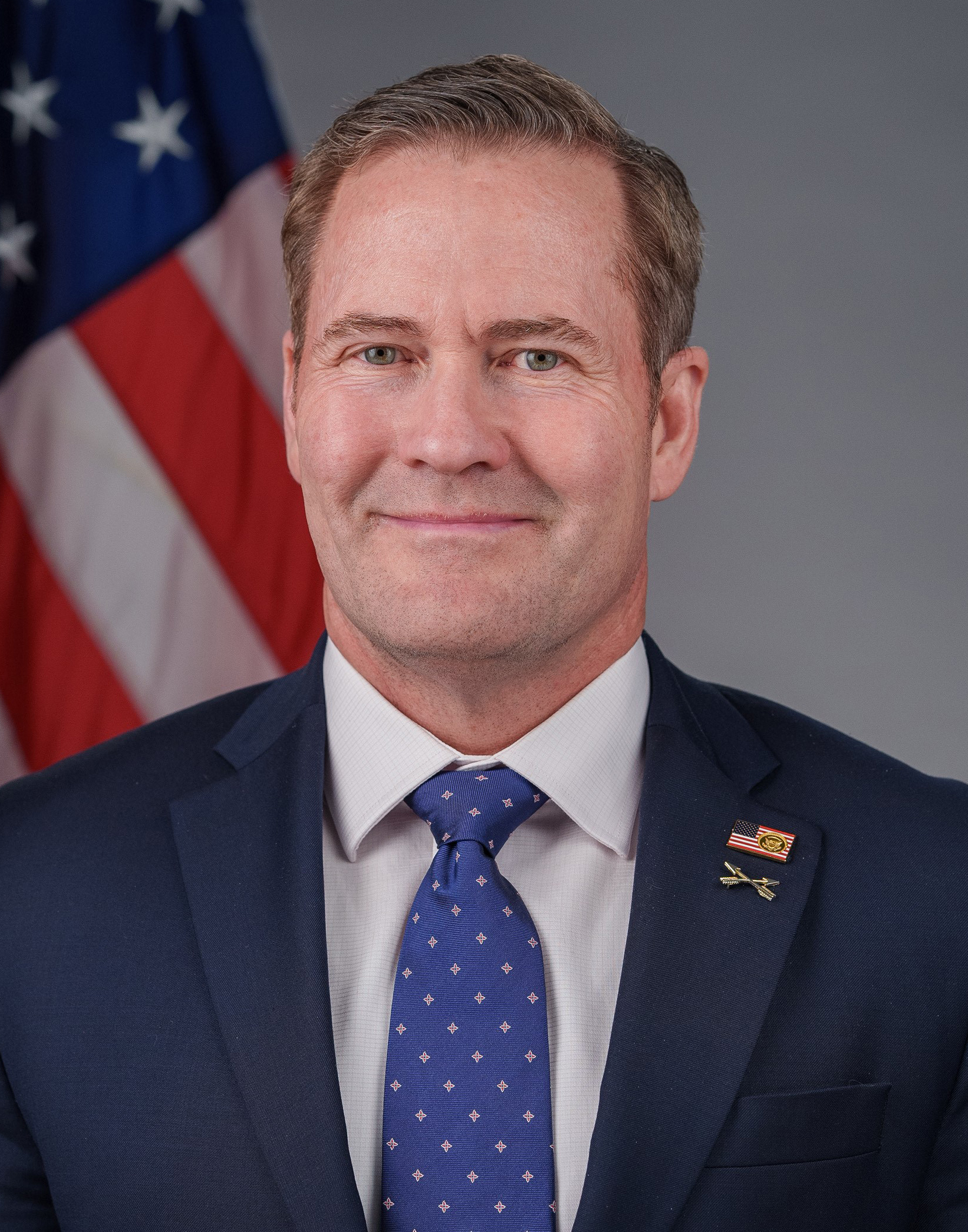
Mike Waltz

- January 1
  - Kevin Beirne, baseball player
  - Derek Kilmer, politician
  - Jonah Peretti, entrepreneur and publisher
- January 3 – Katie Porter, politician
- January 5 – Ryan Minor, baseball player (d. 2023)
- January 6
  - Marlon Anderson, baseball player
  - Paul Grant, basketball player and coach
- January 7
  - Valeyta Althouse, Olympic shot putter
  - Vance McAllister, politician
  - John Rich, country singer/songwriter, one half of Big & Rich, and bassist for Lonestar (1992–1998)
- January 8 – Jorge Pallo, actor
- January 9 – Tom Bissell, journalist, critic, and writer
- January 10 – Mariusz Adamski, Polish-born photographer
- January 11 – Max von Essen, actor and vocalist
- January 12 – Jeremy Bates, boxer
- January 13
  - Ravinder Bhalla, politician, mayor of Hoboken, New Jersey
  - Brad Hawkins, actor, martial artist, and musician
  - Kaili Vernoff, actress
- January 14
  - Rick Baird, bobsledder
  - Kevin Durand, Canadian-born actor and singer
- January 15 – Ray King, baseball player
- January 16
  - Paul Buentello, mixed martial artist
  - Brent Hinds, guitarist for Mastodon (d. 2025)
- January 17
  - Heather Bagnall, politician
  - Derrick Mason, football player
  - Keith Robinson, actor and R&B singer
- January 18
  - Mike Blabac, Paralympic sledge hockey player
  - John Brannen, basketball player and coach
  - Shane Burton, football player
  - Darren Bush, baseball player and coach
  - Maulik Pancholy, actor
- January 19
  - Gentry Bradley, sprinter
  - Marquita Bradshaw, environmentalist, activist, and political candidate
  - Kareem Burke, entrepreneur, record executive, and producer
  - Frank Caliendo, actor, comedian, and impressionist
- January 20
  - Thomas Beatie, public speaker, author, and advocate of transgender and sexuality issues
  - Rae Carruth, football player
- January 21
  - Maxwell Atoms, animator, screenwriter, storyboard artist, and voice actor
  - Remy Auberjonois, actor
- January 23
  - Jackie Billet, soccer player
  - Chris Bowers, blogger
  - Tiffani Thiessen, actress
- January 24
  - Tim Biakabutuka, football player
  - Ed Helms, actor and comedian
- January 28
  - Benjamin Anderson, musician and songwriter
  - Zack Bronson, football player and coach
- January 29
  - Alonzo Baldonado, politician
  - Dorian Boose, football player (d. 2016)
- January 30
  - Scott Anderson, Olympic runner
  - Jim Arellanes, football player
  - Carl Broemel, guitarist for My Morning Jacket
- January 31
  - Afu-Ra, rapper
  - Bob Ballinger, politician
  - Mike Waltz, politician

=== February ===
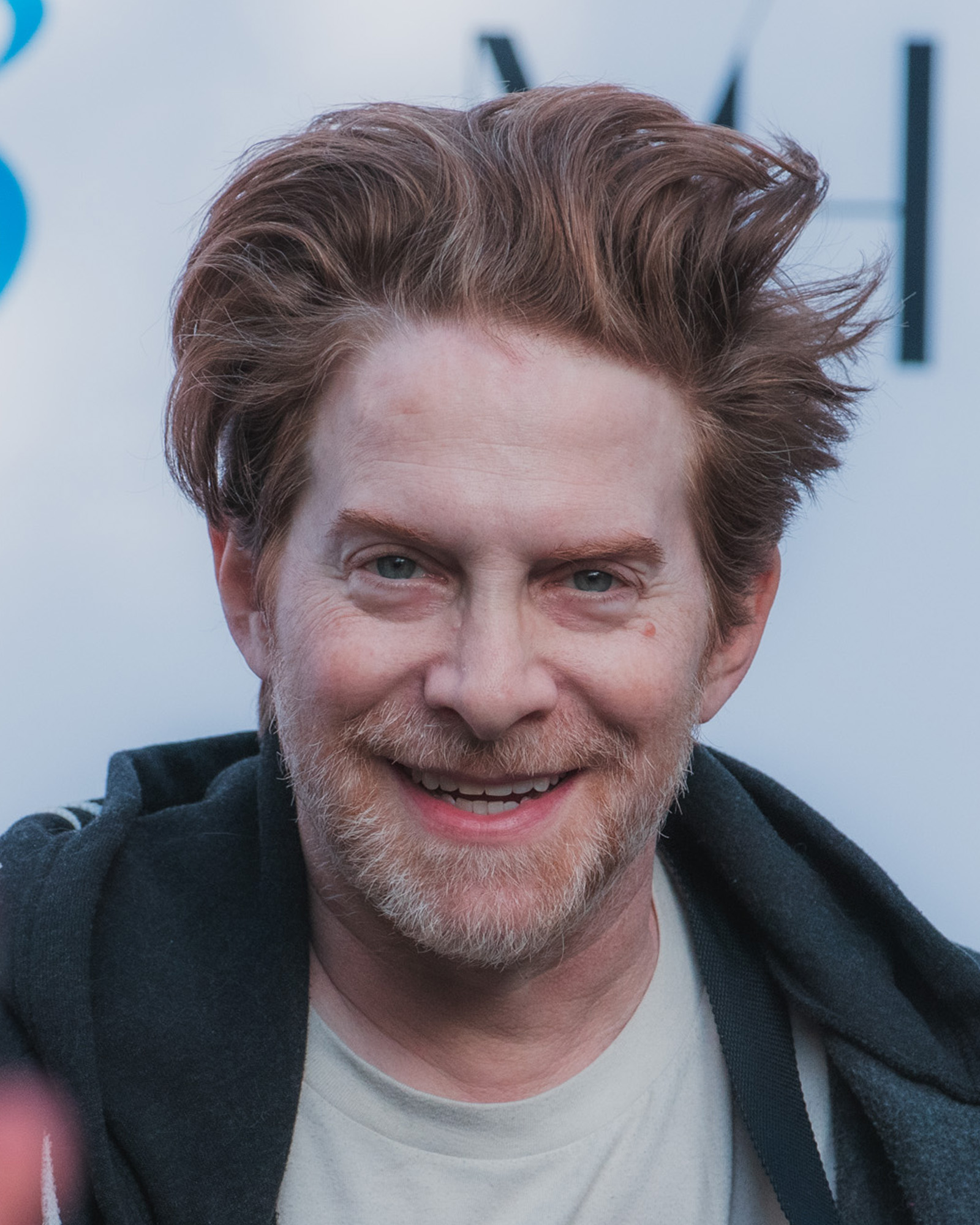
Seth Green

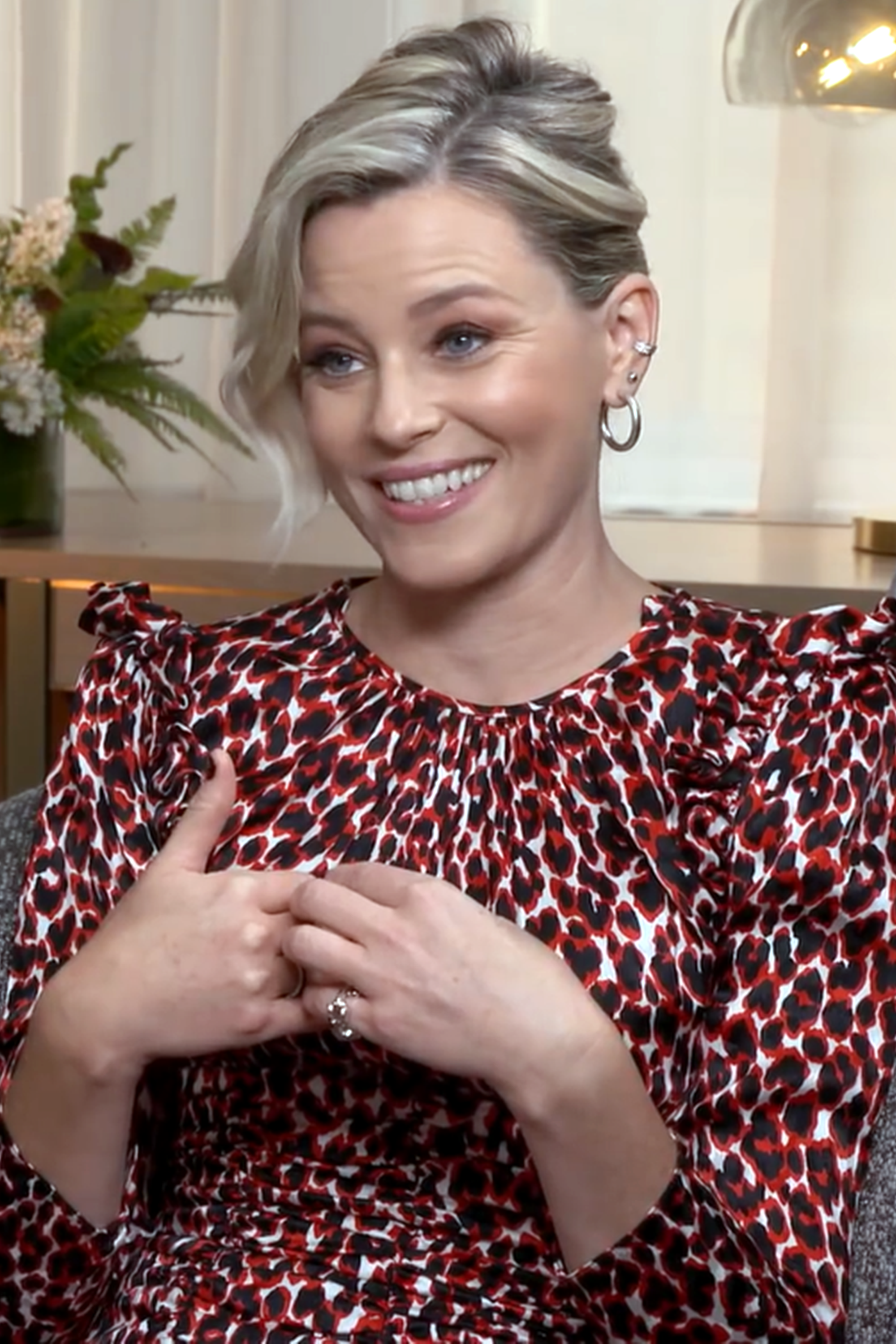
Elizabeth Banks

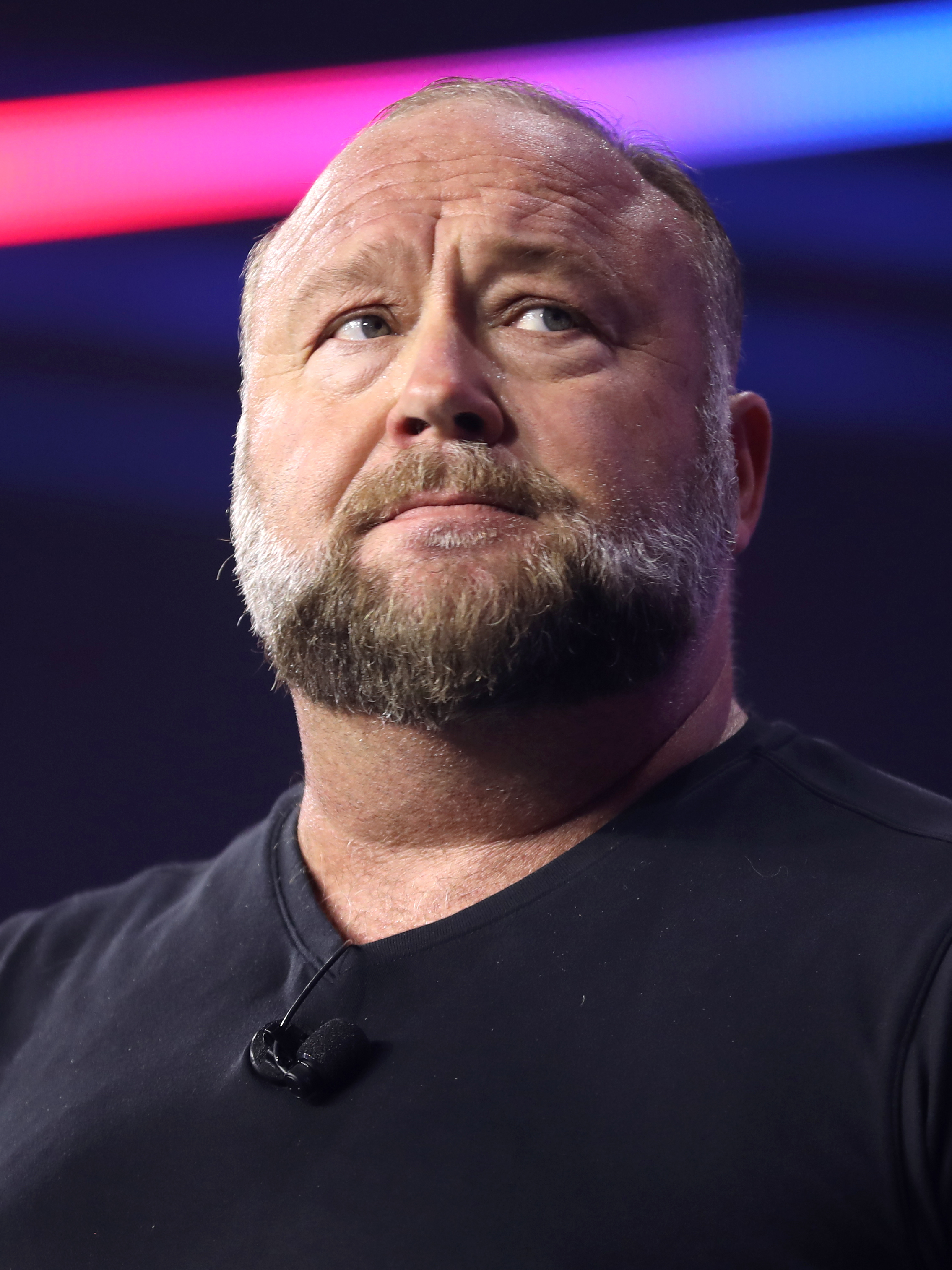
Alex Jones

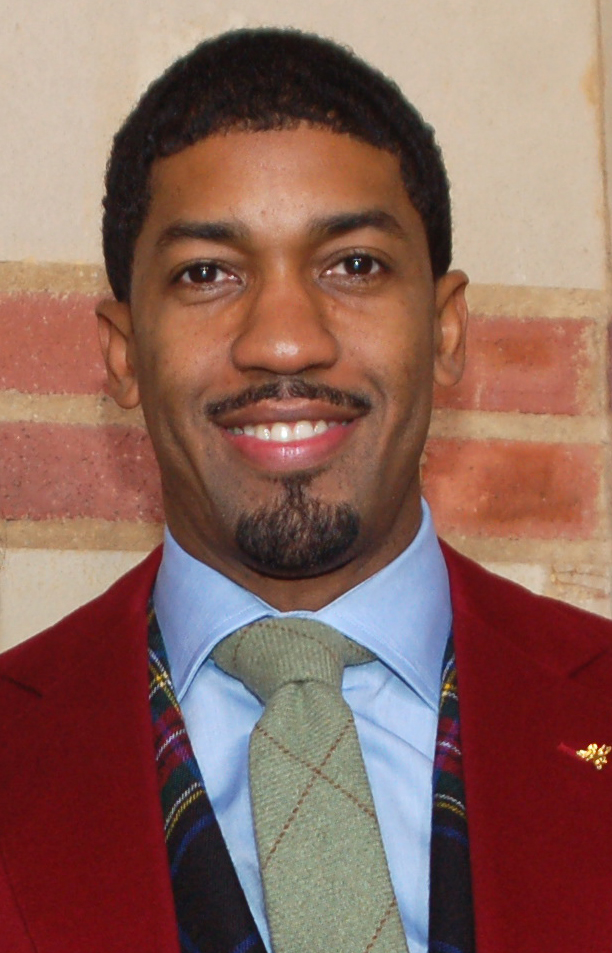
Fonzworth Bentley

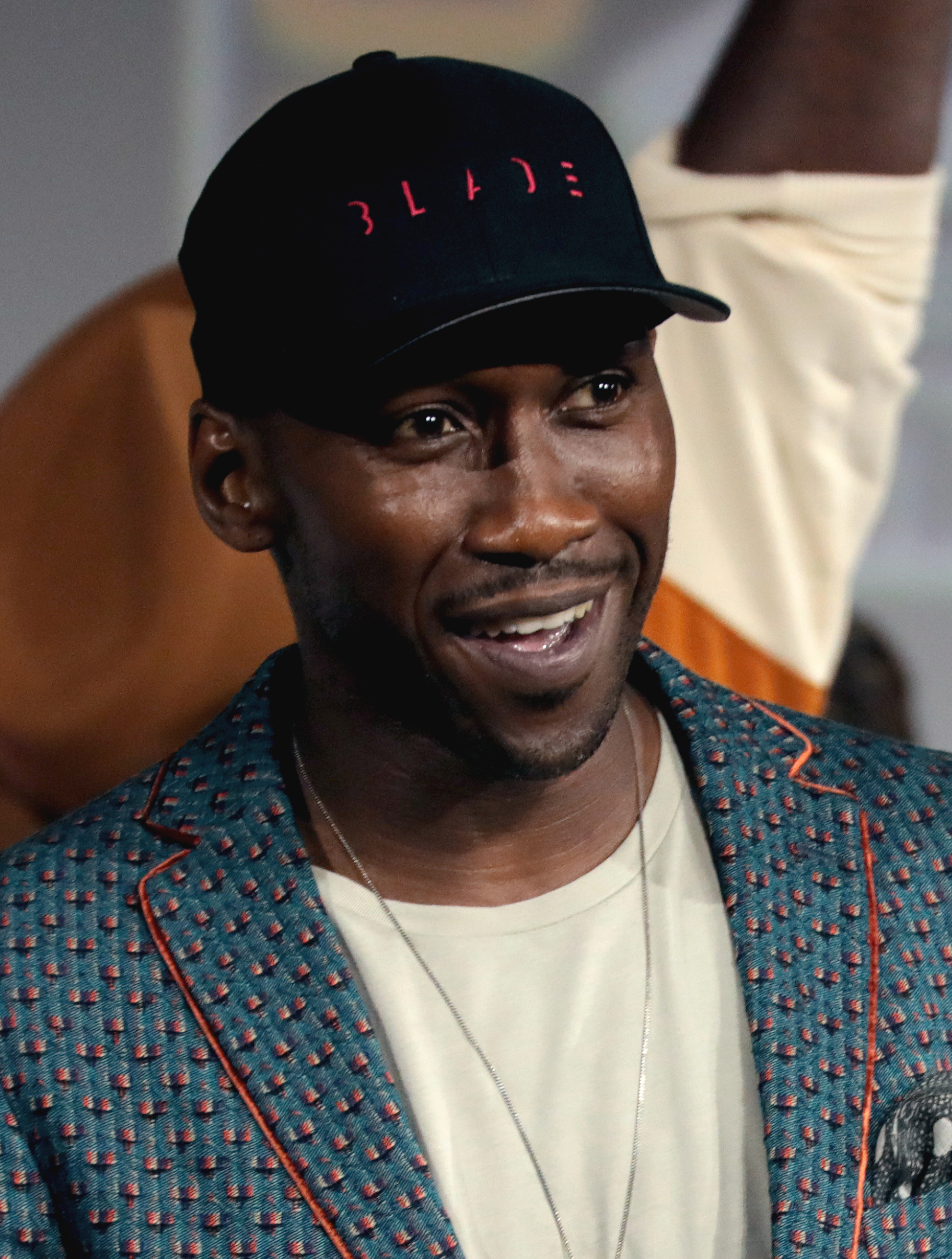
Mahershala Ali

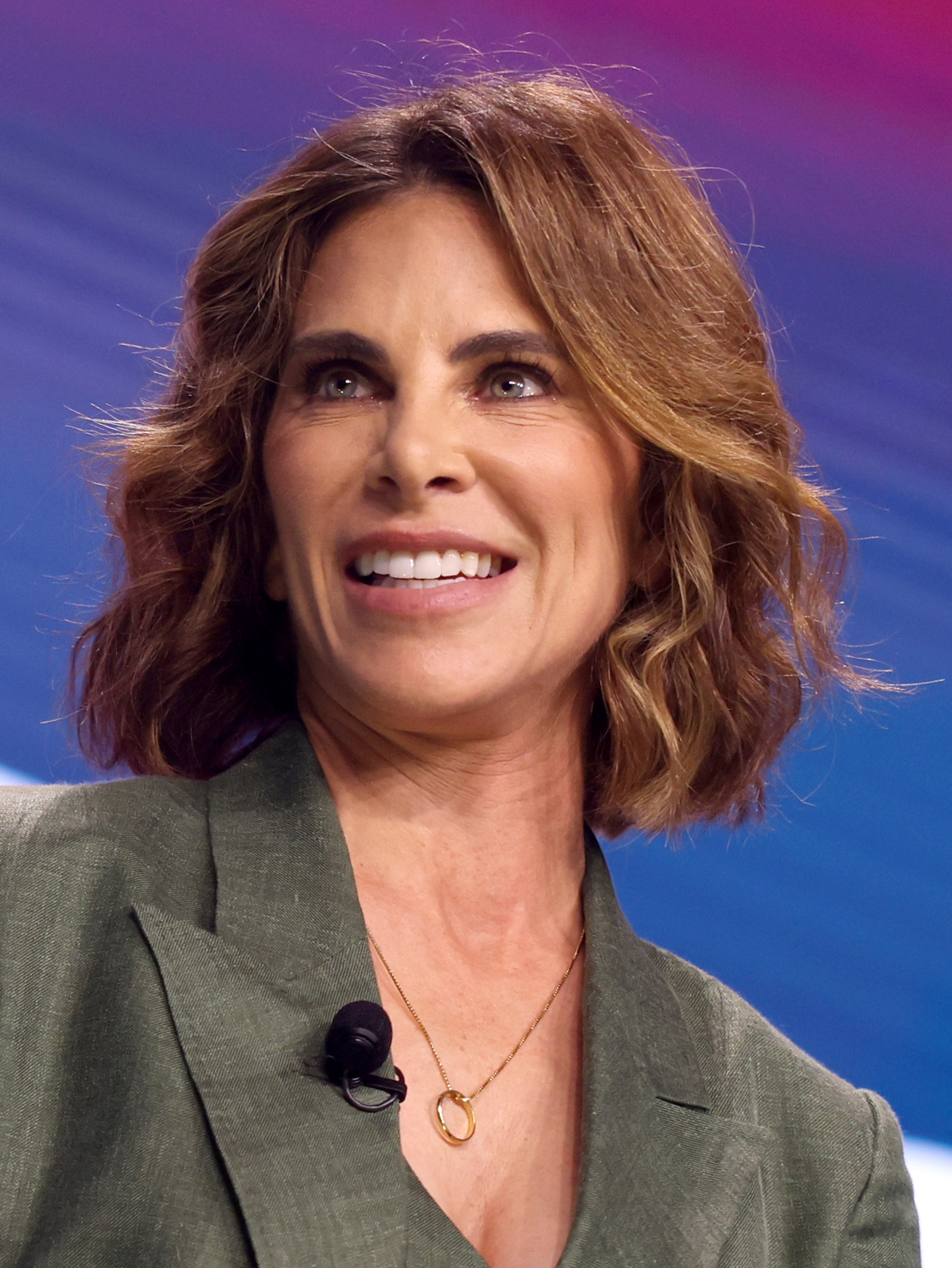
Jillian Michaels

- February 1 – Kurt Ballou, guitarist for Converge
- February 2
  - Derick Brownell, soccer player
  - Osgood Perkins, actor, screenwriter, and director
- February 3
  - Kenny Bailey, football player
  - Pauly Burke, cyclist
  - Casey Elliott, stock car racing driver (d. 1996)
  - Ayanna Pressley, politician
- February 4 – Scott Burnett, darts player
- February 5 – Omarosa, reality TV star and White House aide
- February 6 – Luz Rivas, politician
- February 7
  - Adrian Brown, baseball player
  - J Dilla, record producer and rapper (d. 2006)
- February 8
  - Maggie Bandur, writer and producer
  - Seth Green, actor, comedian, voice actor, television producer, and screenwriter
  - Susan May Pratt, actress
  - Kimbo Slice, Bahamian-born boxer and mixed martial artist (d. 2016)
- February 9
  - Orlando Bobo, football player (d. 2007)
  - Amber Valletta actress and model
- February 10
  - Elizabeth Banks, actress and director
  - R. J. Bowers, football player
  - David Datuna, Georgian-born artist (d. 2022)
  - Tanoai Reed, actor and stuntman
- February 11
  - Trey Beamon, baseball player
  - D'Angelo, R&B musician (d., 2025)
  - Alex Jones, radio show host and conspiracy theorist
- February 12
  - Jerry Bohlander, mixed martial artist
  - Justin T. Bowler, actor, writer, and producer
  - Lisa Brenner, actress
  - Ari Shaffir, comedian and actor
- February 13
  - Fonzworth Bentley, rapper, actor, television presenter, and author
  - Sabina Matos, politician, 70th Lieutenant Governor of Rhode Island
- February 14 – Lara Bazelon, journalist, academic, and law professor
- February 15
  - Miranda July, author, director, actor, musician, and spoken-word artist
  - Gina Lynn, porn actress
- February 16 – Mahershala Ali, actor and rapper
- February 17
  - Tavian Banks, football player
  - Jerry O'Connell, actor
  - Bryan White, singer/songwriter and guitarist
- February 18
  - Carrie Ann Baade, painter and academic
  - Jamey Carroll, baseball player
  - Jillian Michaels, personal trainer, businesswoman, author and TV personality
- February 19 – Lezley Zen, pornographic actress
- February 20 – Steven Reed, politician, mayor of Montgomery, Alabama (2019–present)
- February 22 – Ana, Cuban-born singer
- February 23 – Kimberly Yee, politician
- February 24
  - Wuv Bernardo, drummer for P.O.D.
  - Chad Hugo, keyboard player, songwriter, and producer
  - Mike Lowell, baseball player and sportscaster
  - Bonnie Somerville, actress
- February 26 – Jenna Wolfe, Jamaican-born journalist and personal trainer
- February 27
  - Ronnie Anderson, football player
  - Carte Goodwin, politician
- February 28 – Kevin Abrams, football player

=== March ===
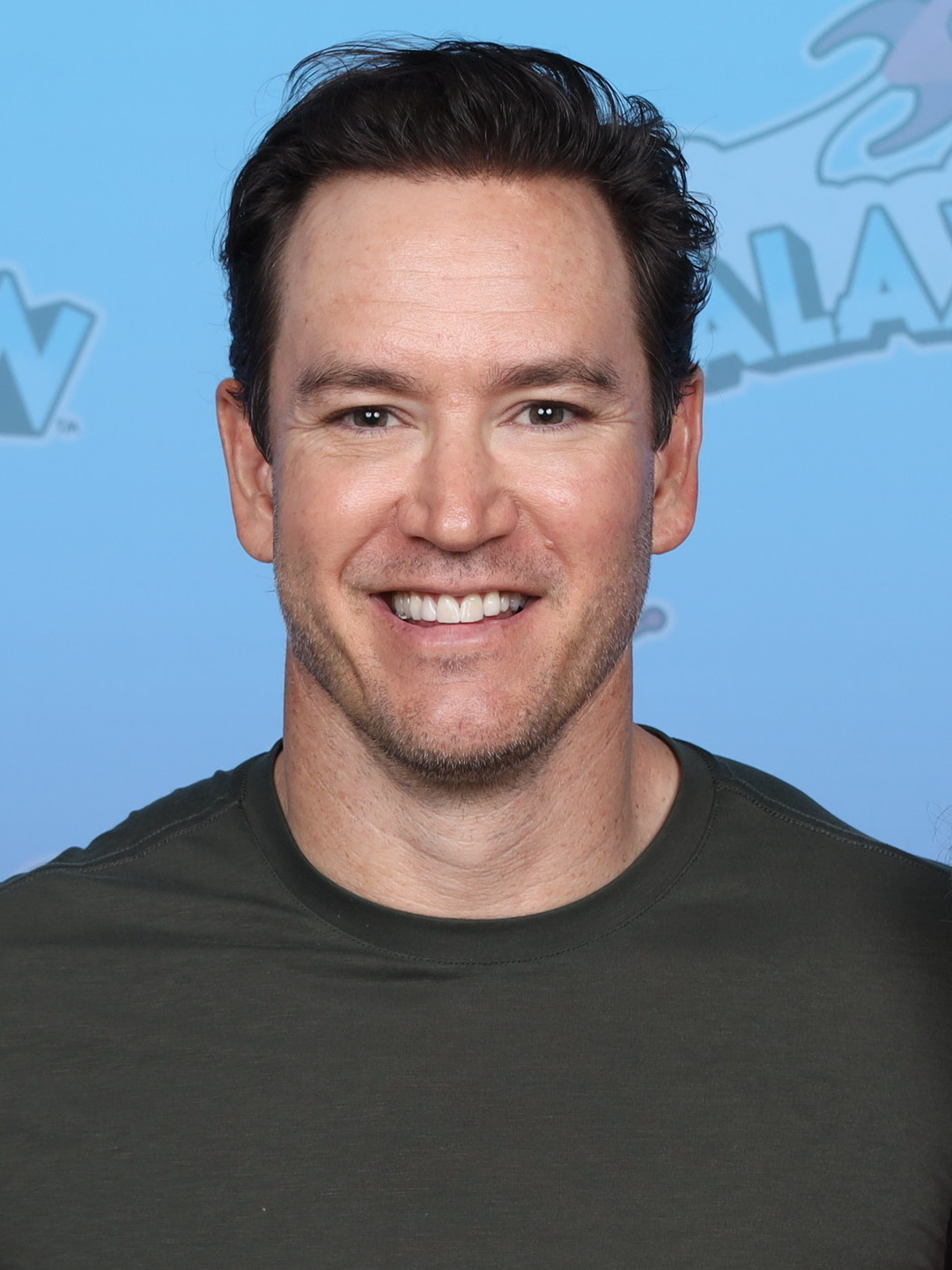
Mark-Paul Gosselaar

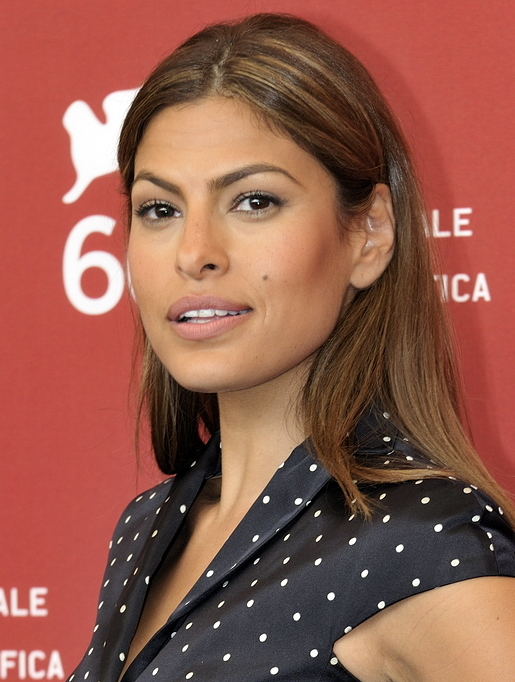
Eva Mendes

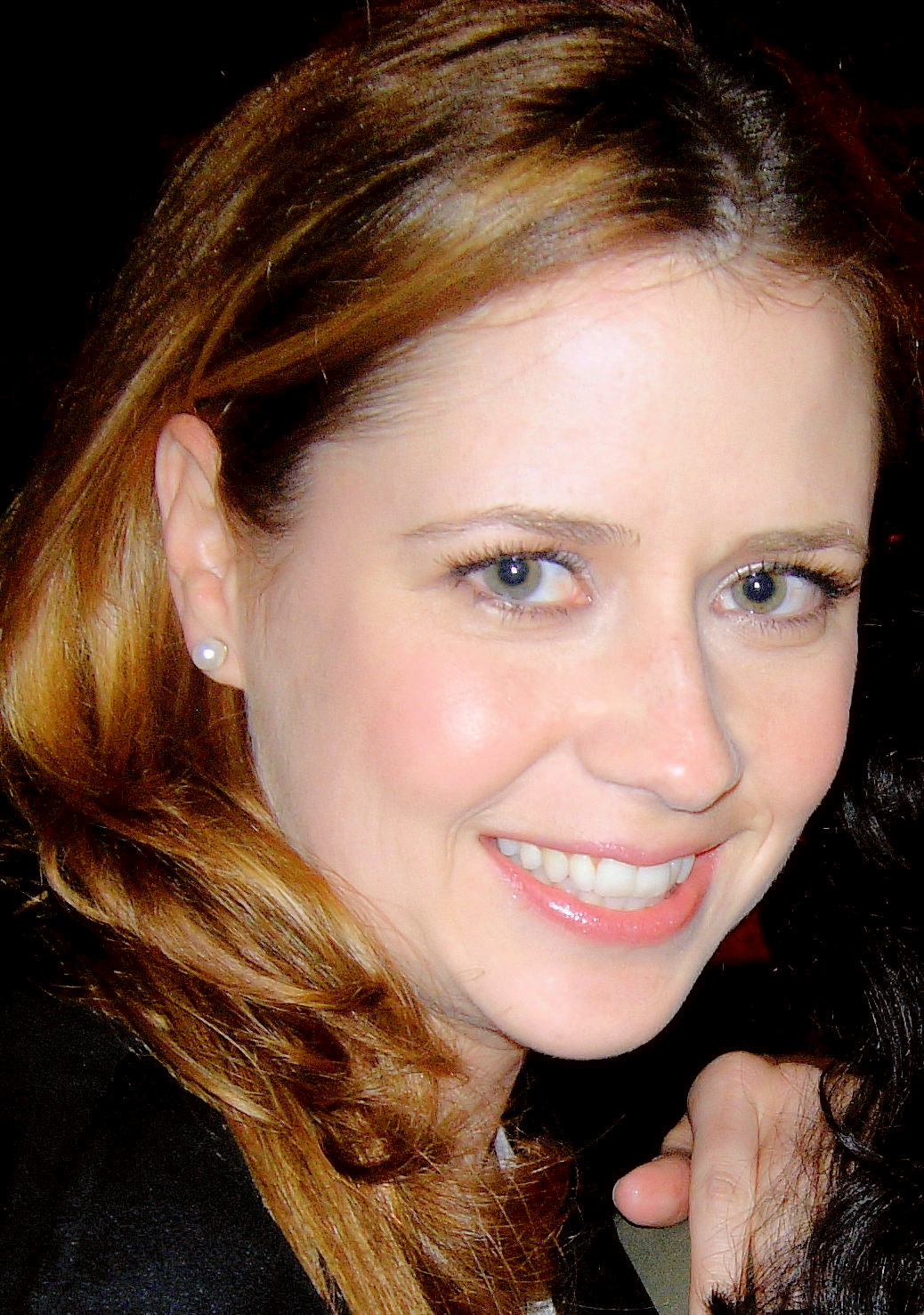
Jenna Fischer

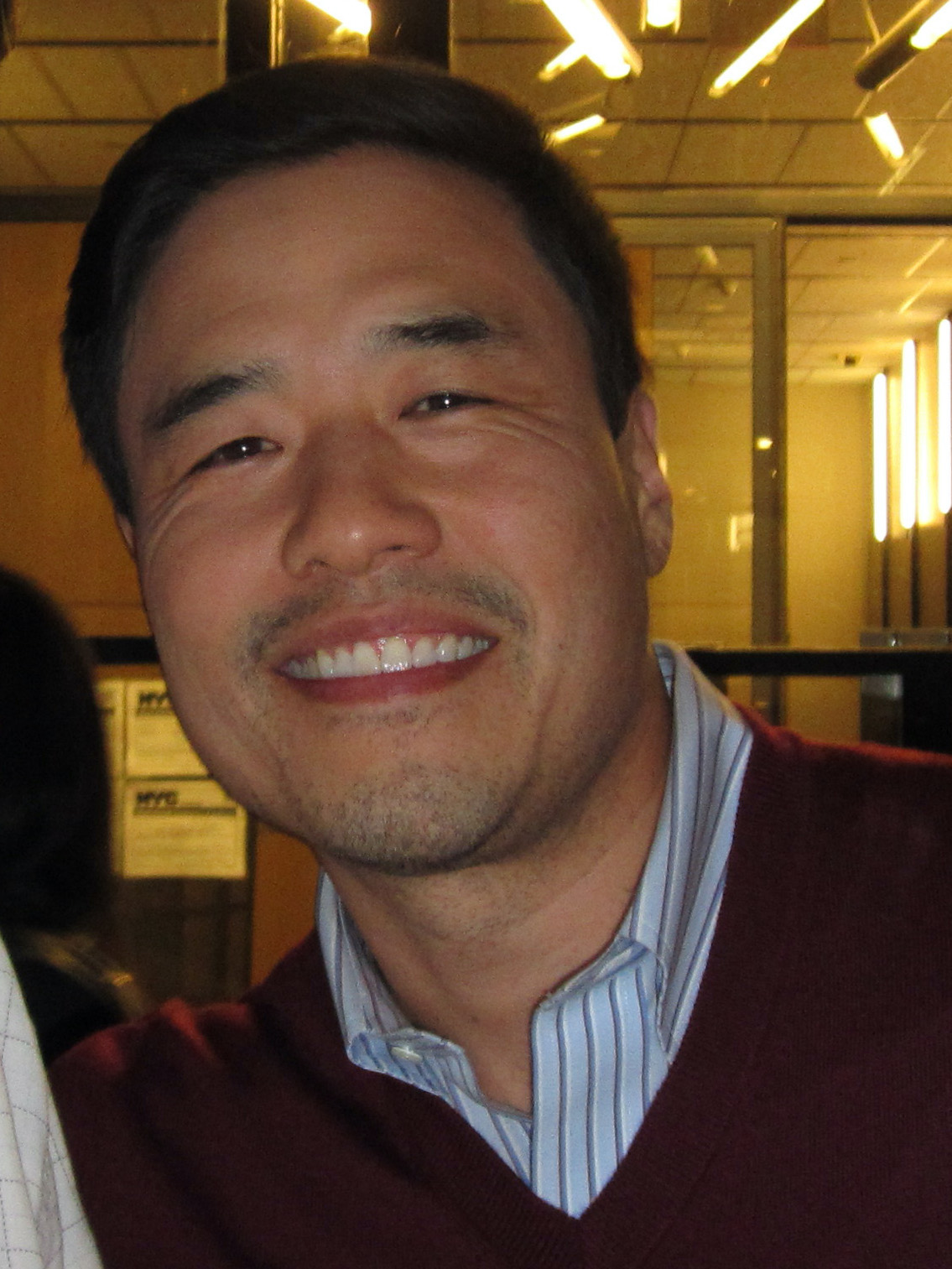
Randall Park

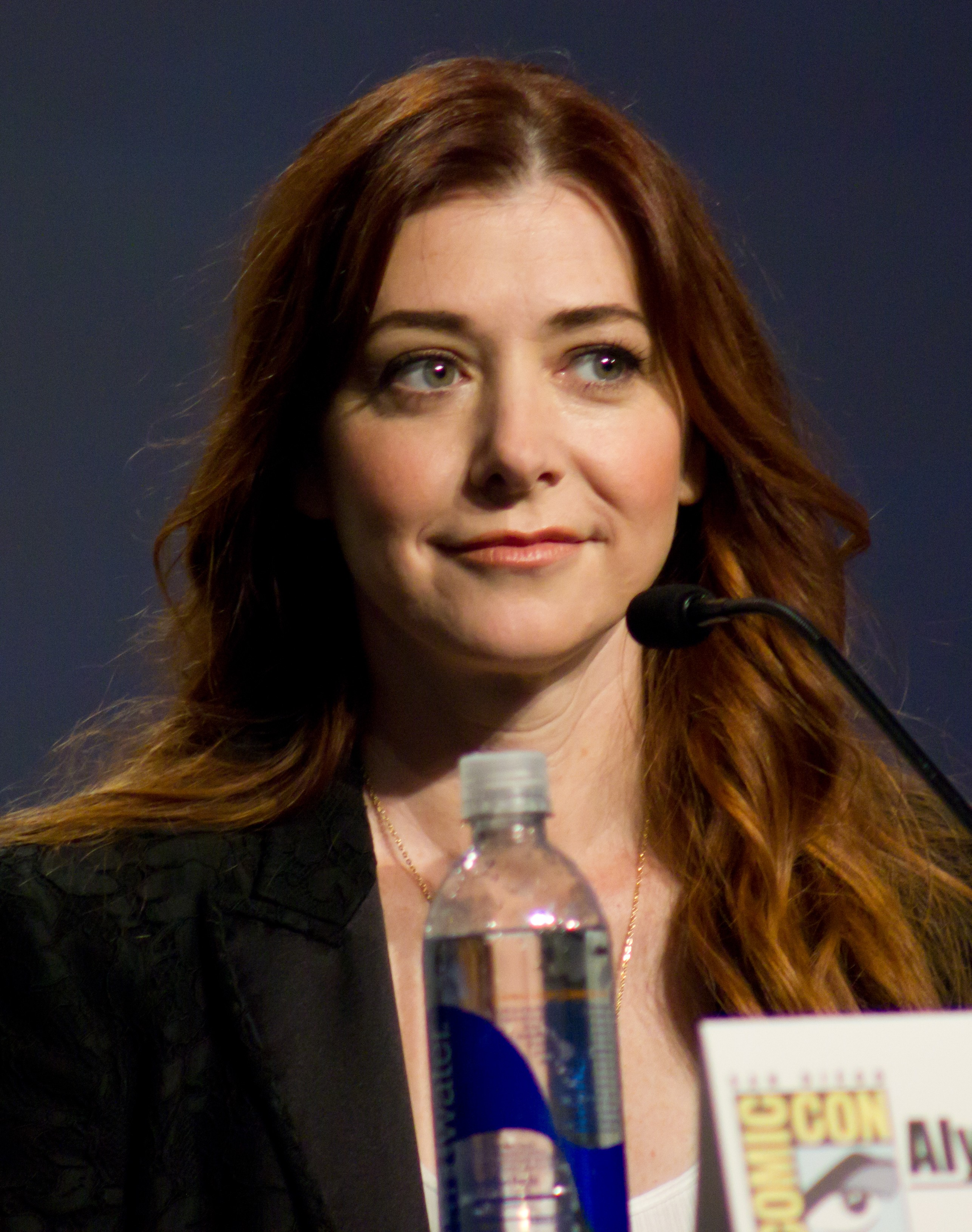
Alyson Hannigan

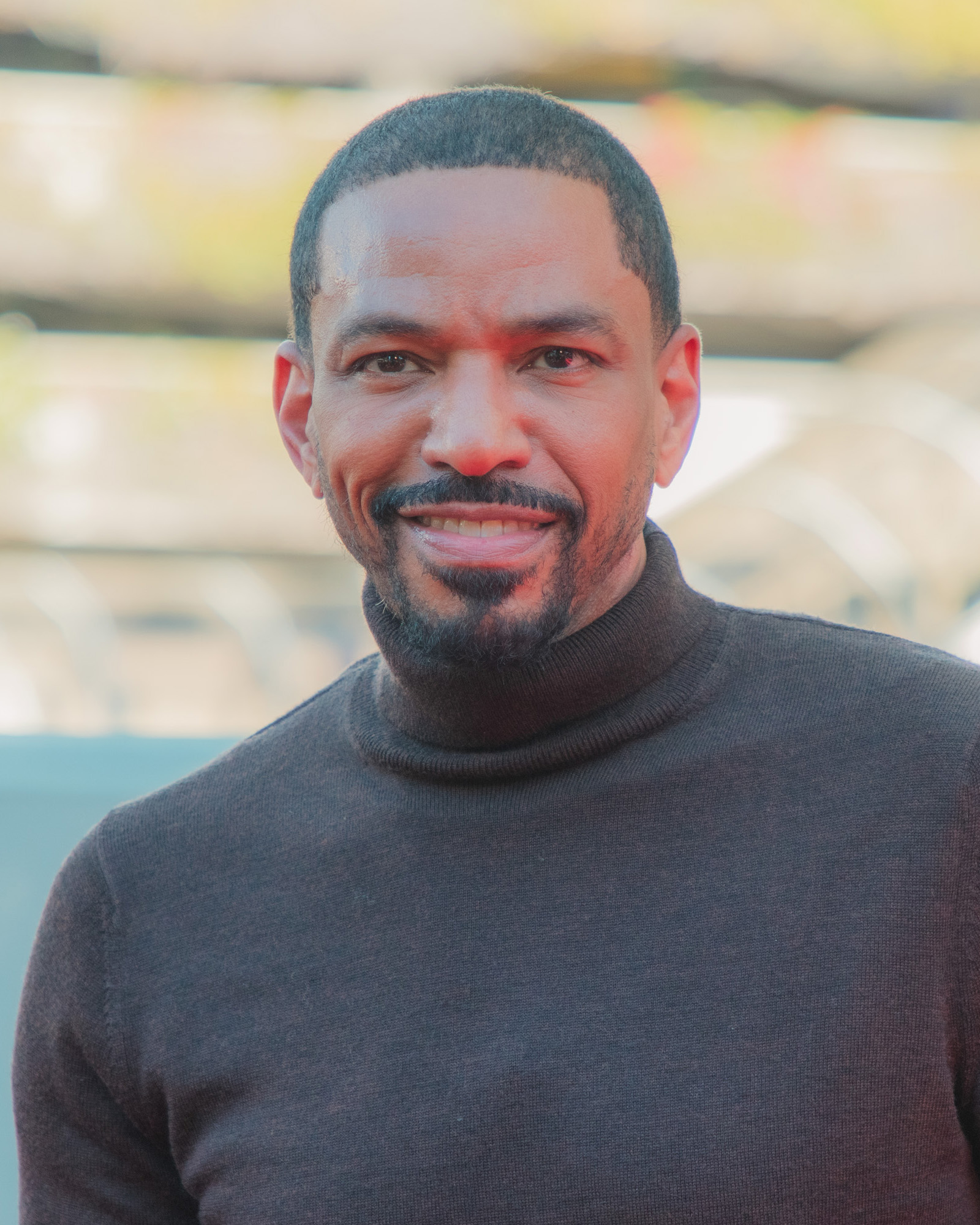
Laz Alonso

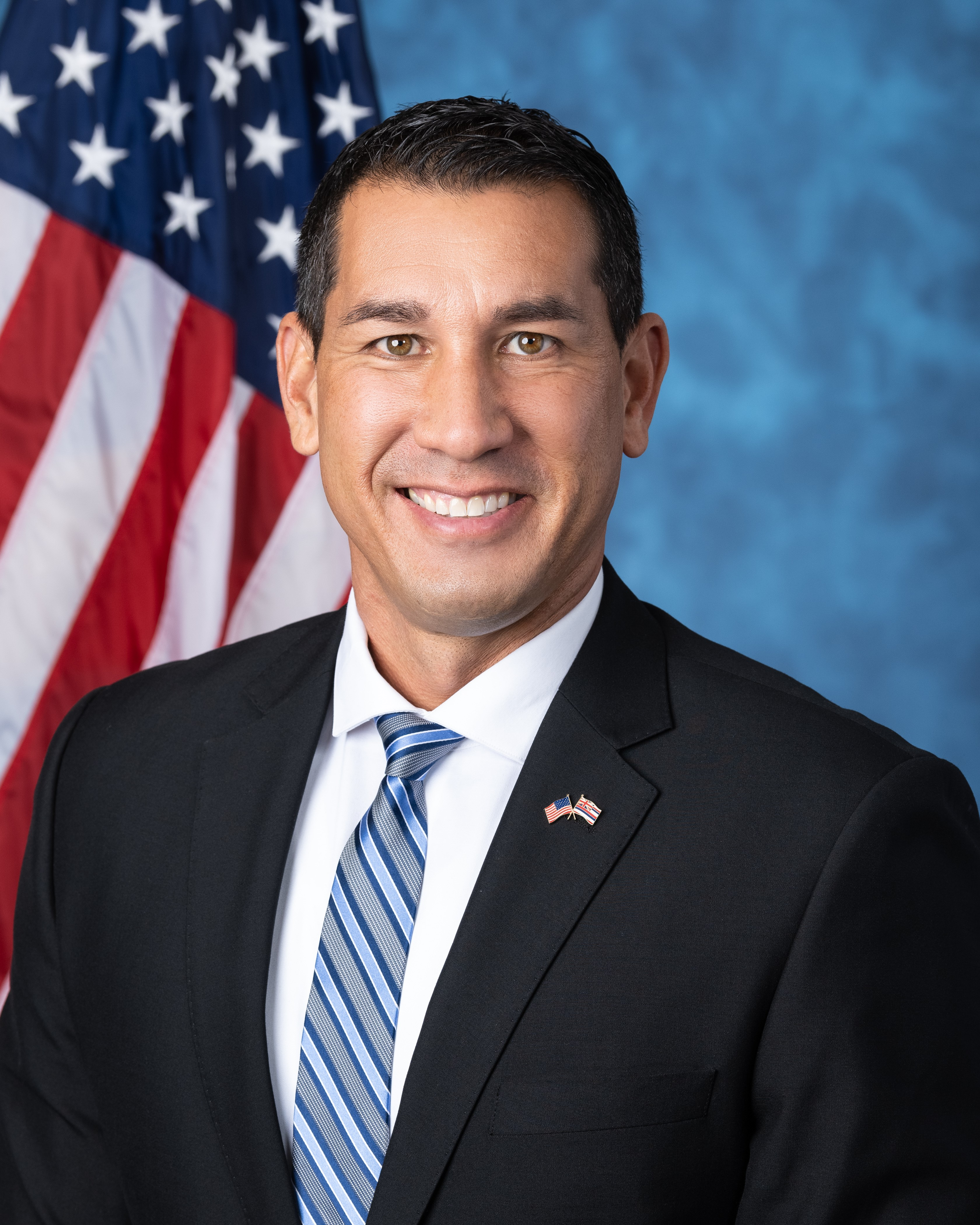
Kai Kahele

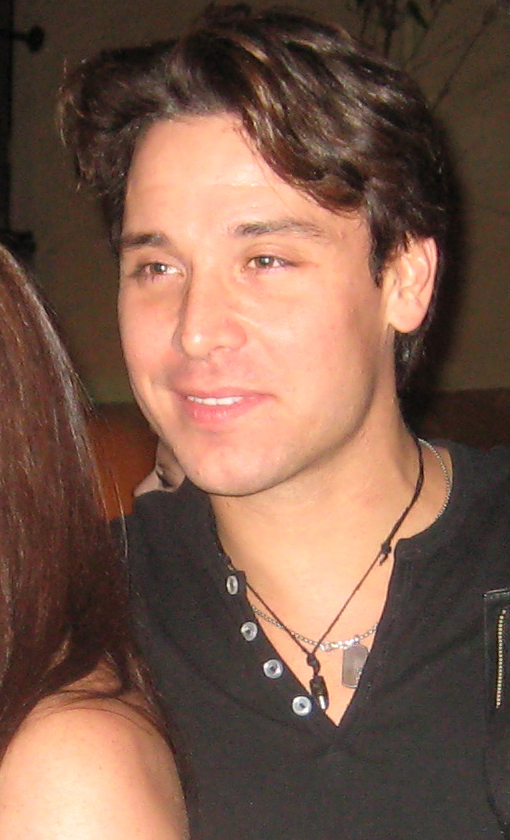
Kristoffer Cusick

- March 1
  - Brandi Alexander, wrestler
  - Stephen Davis, football player and coach
  - Mark-Paul Gosselaar, actor
- March 3
  - David Faustino, actor
  - Jared Rushton, actor
  - George T. Whitesides, politician
- March 4
  - April Berg, politician
  - Jeff Bhasker, record producer, songwriter, and multi-instrumentalist
- March 5
  - Kevin Connolly, actor and director
  - Eva Mendes, actress and model
  - Jill Ritchie, actress
- March 6 – Beanie Sigel, rapper and actor
- March 7
  - Larry Bagby, actor and musician
  - Andreas Borgeas, politician
  - Jenna Fischer, actress
- March 8 – Danny Corkill, child actor
- March 10 – Biz Stone, entrepreneur and co-founder of Twitter and Jelly
- March 11 – Chris Blackshear, politician
- March 12 – Jama Williamson, actress
- March 13
  - Dan Ackerman, video game journalist
  - Shane Taylor, British-born actor
- March 14
  - Della Au Belatti, politician
  - Grace Park, American-born Canadian actress
- March 15
  - Imad Baba, soccer player
  - SuAnne Big Crow, basketball player (d. 1992)
- March 16
  - Contessa Brewer, journalist
  - Lamont Burns, football player
- March 18 – Evan and Jaron Lowenstein, music duo and identical twins
- March 20 – Paula Garcés, Colombian-born actress
- March 21
  - Laura Allen, actress
  - Bryan Berg, cardstacker
  - Sean McDermott, football coach
- March 22
  - Rob Bredow, visual effects artist
  - Marcus Camby, basketball player
  - Kidada Jones, actress
- March 23 – Randall Park, actor, comedian and writer
- March 24
  - Jamie Arnold, baseball player
  - Alyson Hannigan, actress
- March 25
  - Mike Adams, football player
  - Laz Alonso, actor
  - Nick Buda, drummer and record producer
  - Lark Voorhies, actress and singer
- March 27
  - Luis Alejo, politician
  - Quincy Tyler Bernstine, actress and narrator
  - Jason Narvy, actor
  - Alice Wong, disability rights activist (d. 2025)
- March 28
  - Hamisi Amani-Dove, soccer player
  - Eric Beverly, football player
  - Kai Kahele, politician
- March 29
  - Kara Brock, actress
  - Kristoffer Cusick, actor
  - Sharif Street, politician and attorney
- March 30 – Ronnie Kerr, actor
- March 31 – James Burgess, football player

=== April ===
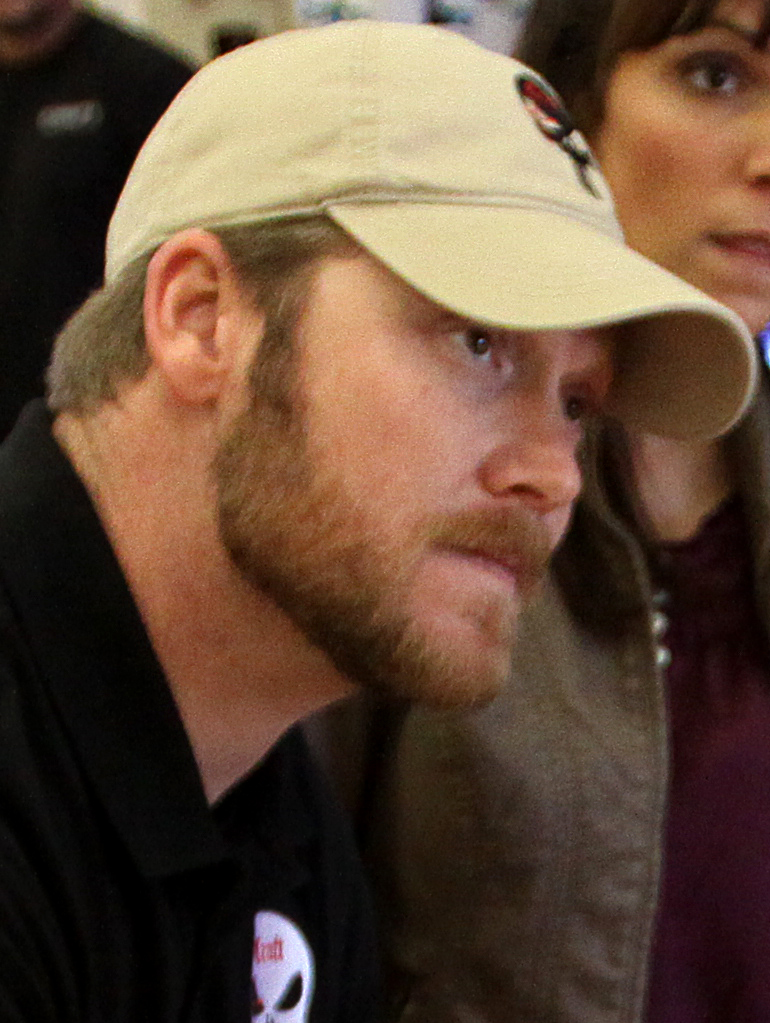
Chris Kyle

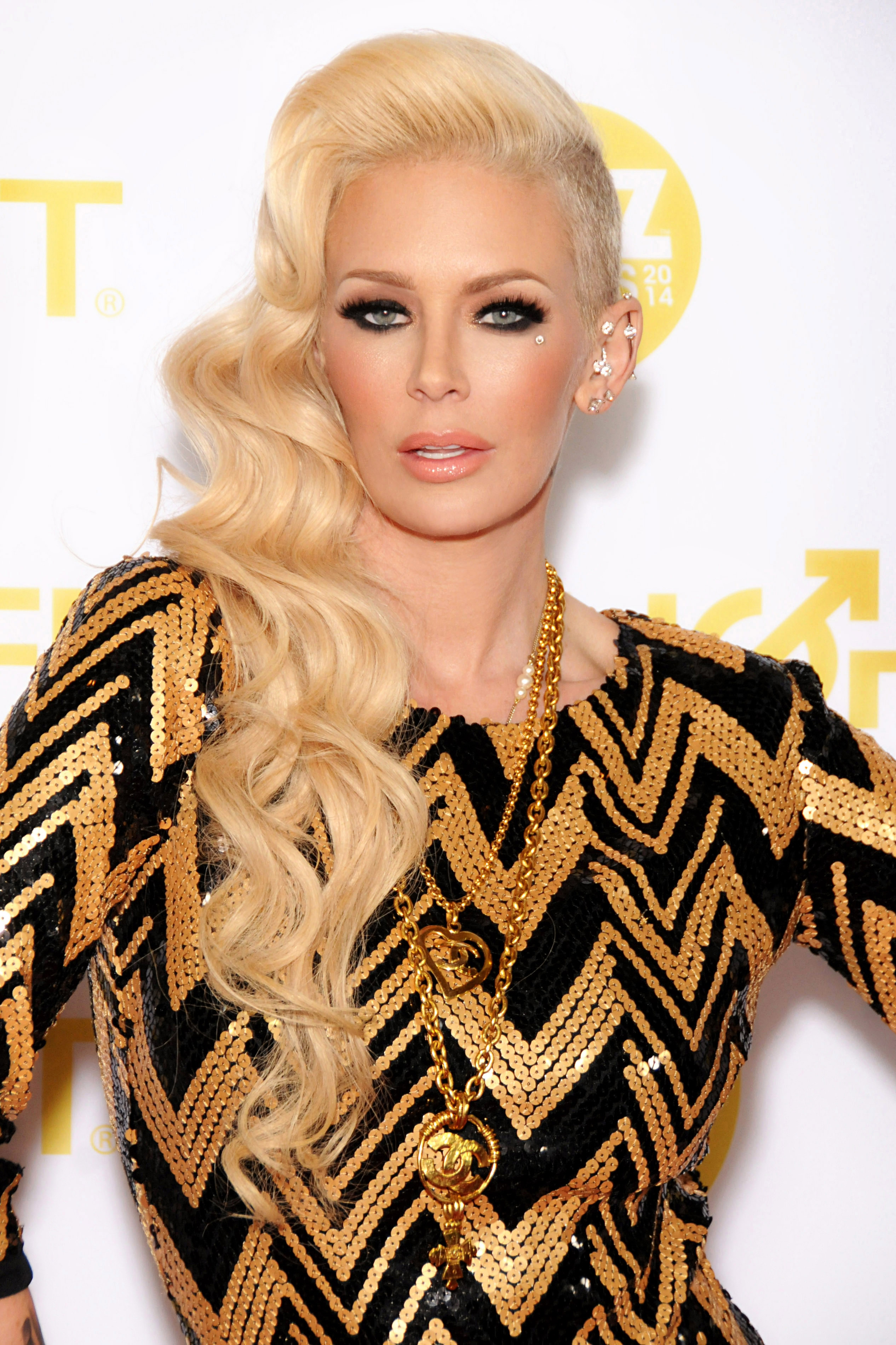
Jenna Jameson

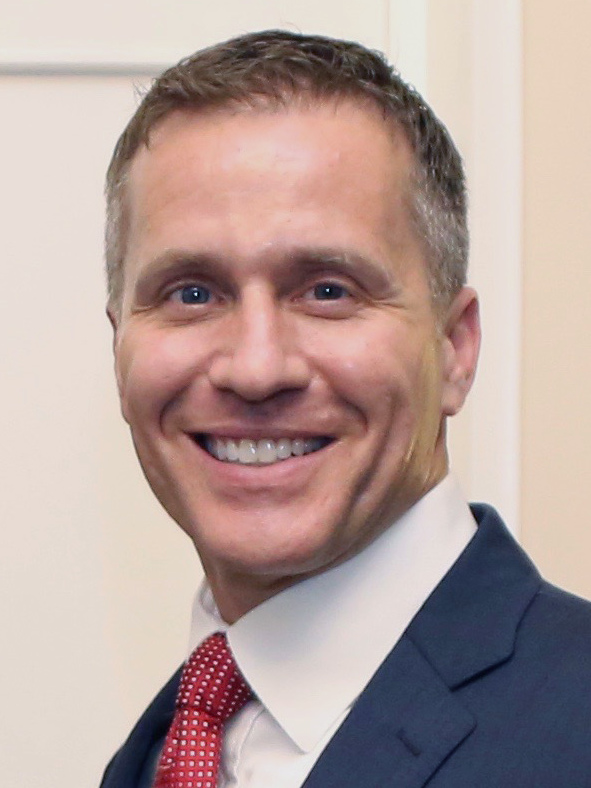
Eric Greitens

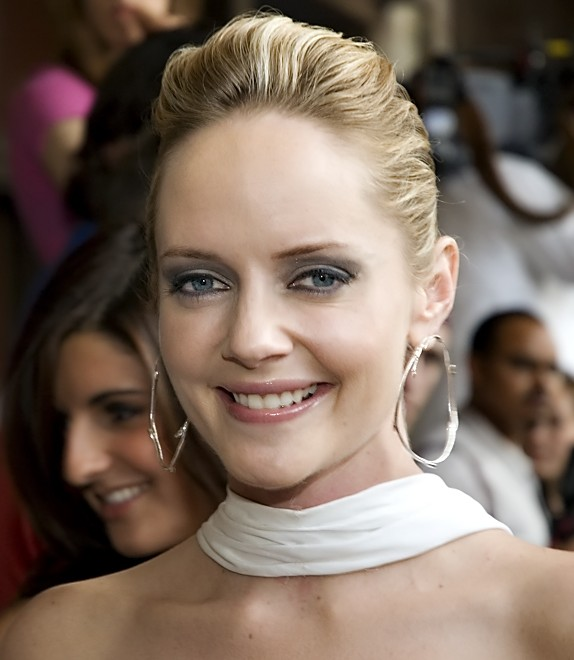
Marley Shelton

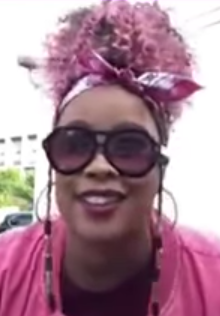
Da Brat

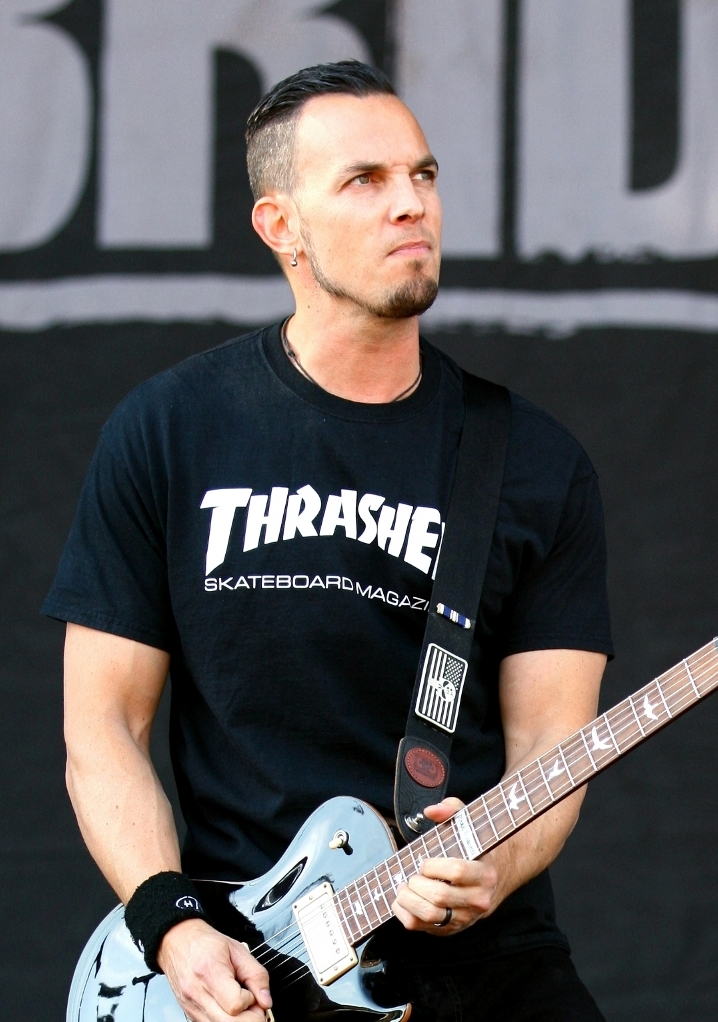
Mark Tremonti

- April 2 – Cary Brothers, singer/songwriter
- April 3 – Marcus Brown, basketball player
- April 4
  - Scott H. Biram, musician
  - Dave Mirra, BMX cyclist and television host (d. 2016)
- April 6 – Marlin Barnes, football player (d. 1996)
- April 7
  - Nathan Baesel, actor
  - Cimarron Bell, serial killer
  - Antonia Bennett, singer
  - Andrea Berloff, screenwriter, actress, director, and producer
- April 8
  - Matthew Arnold, writer, director, and producer
  - Antoine Brockington, basketball player
  - Chris Kyle, Navy SEAL and author (d. 2013)
- April 9
  - Katrina Berger, cyclist
  - Mike Bobo, football player and coach
  - Ben Bordelon, football player
  - Andrew C. Brock, politician
  - Jenna Jameson, pornographic actress
- April 10
  - Scott Bentley, football player
  - Jake Brennan, podcast host, author, and musician
  - Eric Greitens, politician, Navy SEAL, and 56th Governor of Missouri
- April 11
  - David Banner, rapper and actor
  - Robert Barnes, attorney
  - Tricia Helfer, Canadian-born actress
- April 12
  - Mikey Burnett, mixed martial artist
  - Jennifer Knapp, American-born Australian Christian singer/songwriter
  - Marley Shelton, actress
- April 13 – Mick Betancourt, screenwriter, producer, comedian, actor, and director
- April 14
  - Da Brat, rapper
  - Terrance Hunter, Creator of The PREP System LLC, Dream Hunters Inc, and Contract Advisor
- April 15
  - Danny Pino, Cuban-born actor
  - Douglas Spain, actor, director, and producer
  - Tim Thomas, ice hockey player
- April 16 – Valarie Rae Miller, actress
- April 18
  - Josh Byrnes, politician
  - Mark Tremonti, singer/songwriter, guitarist for Creed and Alter Bridge, and frontman for Tremonti
- April 19 – Hlynur Atlason, Icelandic-born industrial designer
- April 20
  - Paul Bradford, football player
  - Randy Fine, politician
- April 21 – Cliff Brumbaugh, baseball player
- April 22
  - Modupe Akinola, organizational scholar and social psychologist
  - Eric Axley, golfer
  - Aaron Buerge, banker, businessman, and television personality
- April 23 – Barry Watson, actor
- April 24 – Derek Luke, actor
- April 25
  - Grant Achatz, chef and restaurateur
  - Jeff Austin, mandolinist and singer (d. 2019)
- April 26
  - Tim Brauch, skateboarder (d. 1999)
  - Sydney Johnson, basketball coach and former player
- April 28 – DeAuntae Brown, football player
- April 29 – Alana Blahoski, Olympic ice hockey player
- April 30
  - Aimee Belgard, politician
  - Deanna Brooks, model and actress

=== May ===
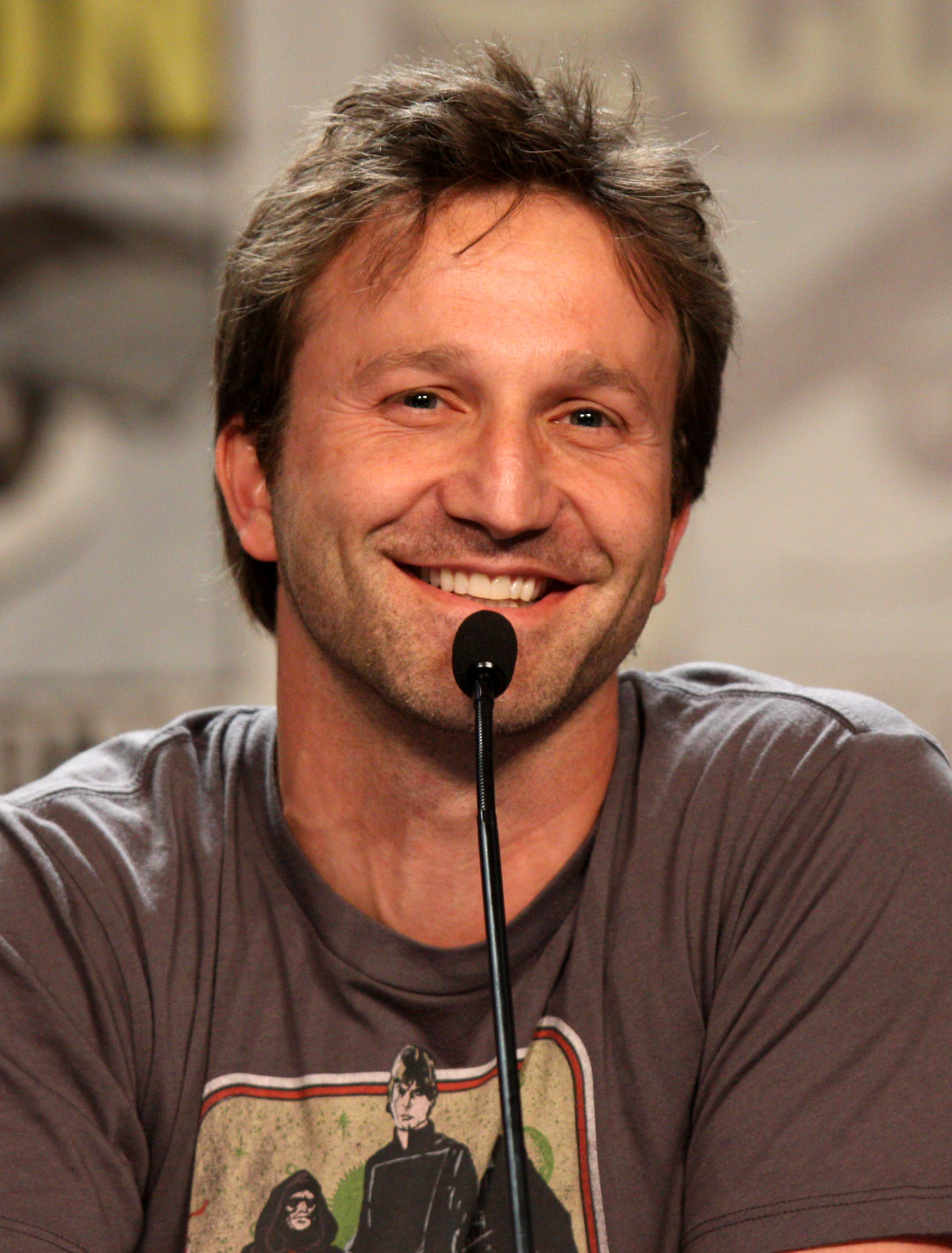
Breckin Meyer

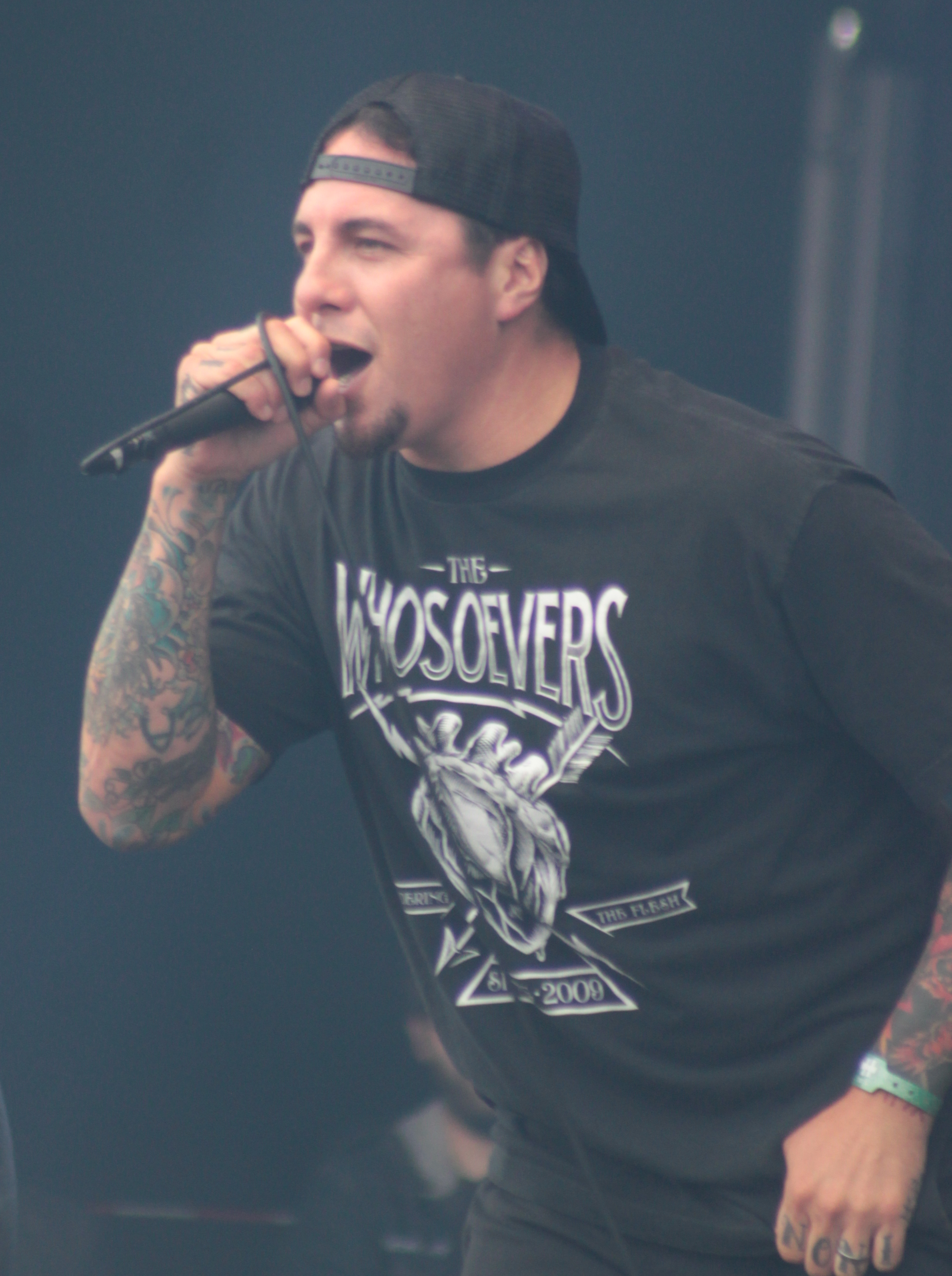
Sonny Sandoval

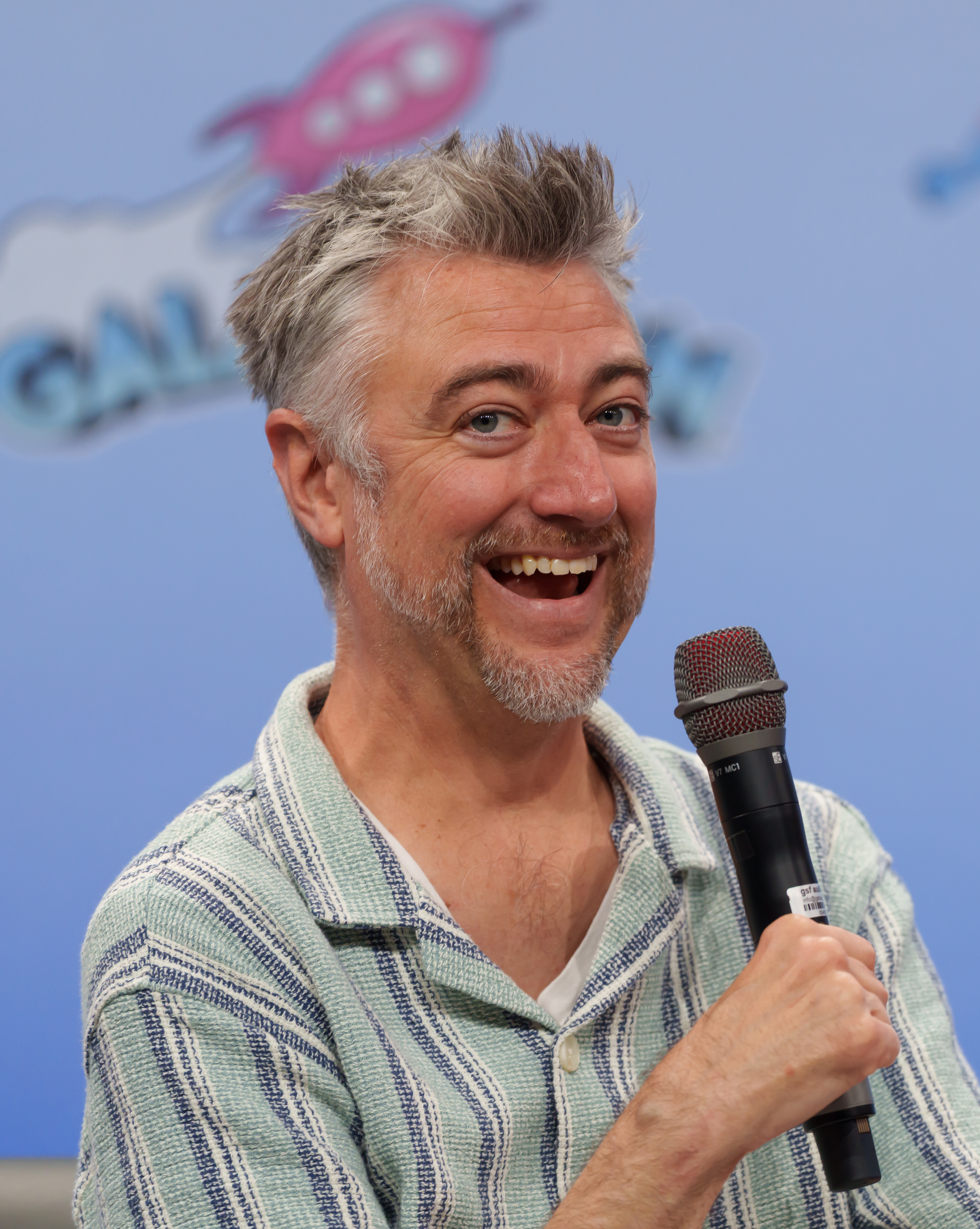
Sean Gunn

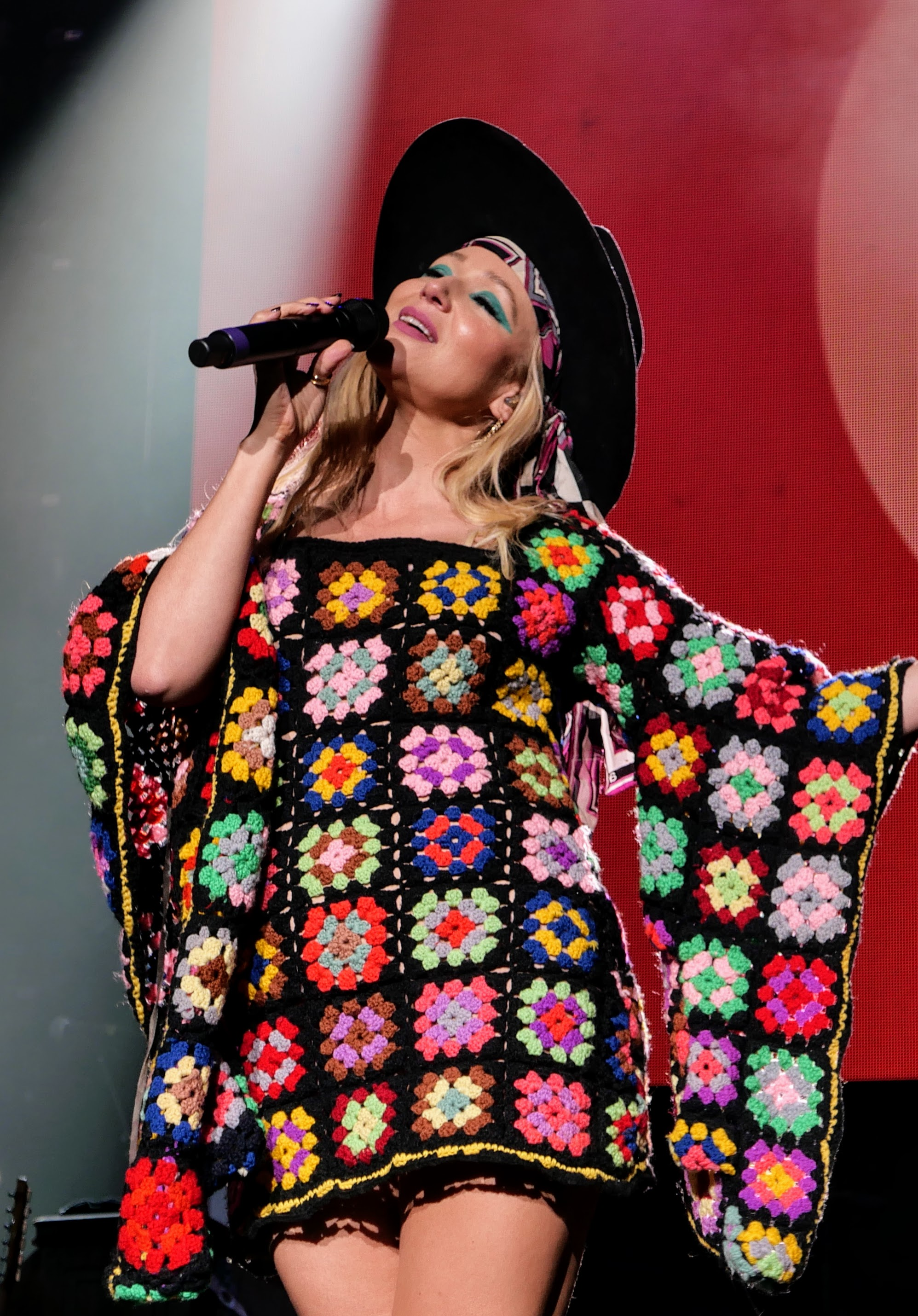
Jewel

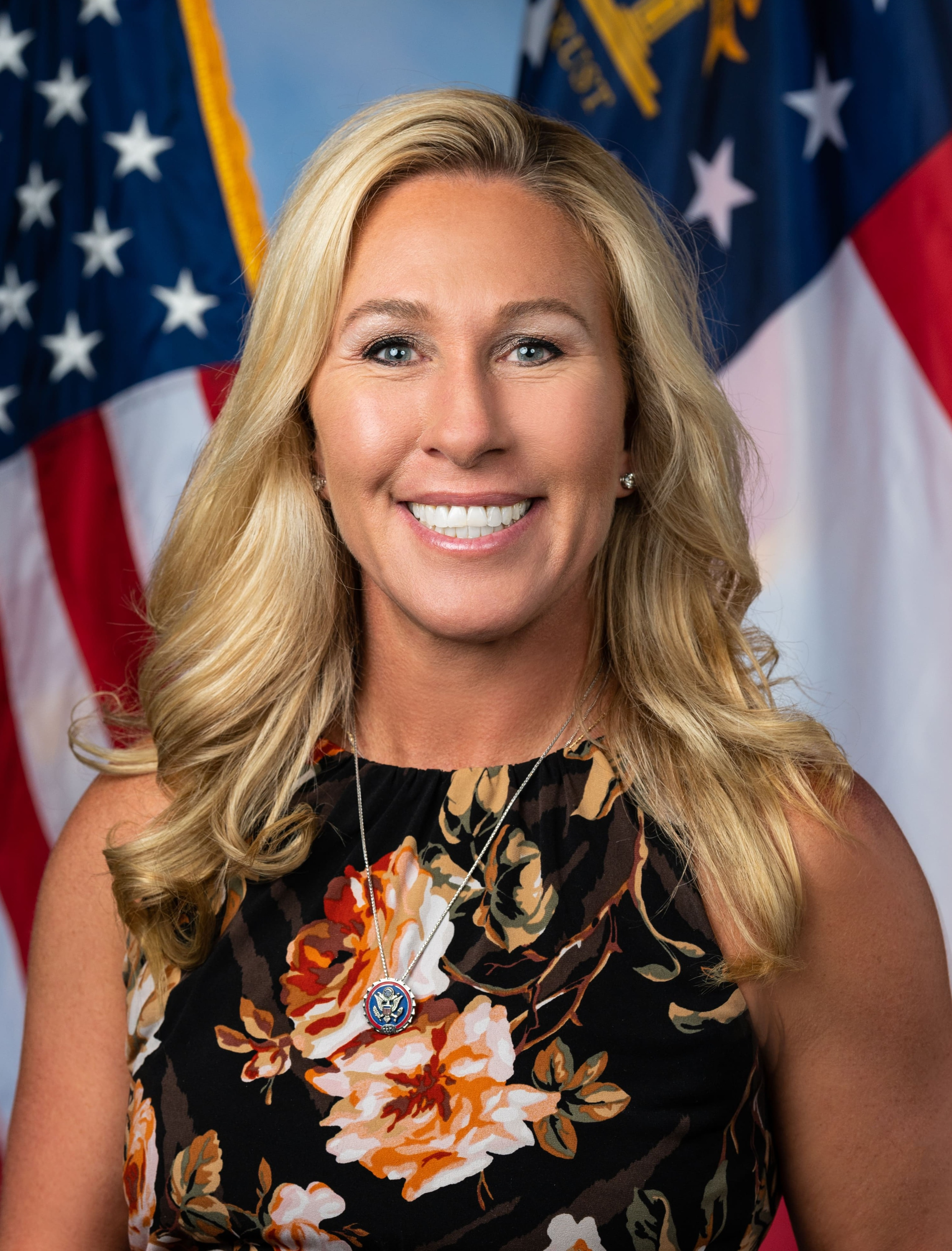
Marjorie Taylor Greene

- May 3 – Joseph Kosinski, film director
- May 4 – Josh Bonner, politician
- May 7
  - Ben Bostrom, motorcycle racer
  - Lawrence Johnson, Olympic pole vaulter
  - Breckin Meyer, actor, drummer, producer, and writer
- May 8
  - Agallah, rapper and producer
  - Keisha Anderson, basketball player
  - Calvin Branch, football player
  - Korey Stringer, football player (d. 2001)
- May 9
  - Brian Deegan, Motocross racer
  - Dylan Lauren, businesswoman, founder of Dylan's Candy Bar
- May 10 – Trent Staggs, politician, mayor of Riverton, Utah (2018–present)
- May 11
  - Adam Kaufman, actor
  - Billy Kidman, wrestler
- May 13 – Louisa Bojesen, Danish-born financial journalist
- May 14
  - Kevin Barnett, volleyball player
  - Mary Biddinger, poet, editor, and academic
  - Carla Jimenez, actress
- May 15 – Ahmet Zappa, actor and musician
- May 16
  - Adam Richman, actor and television personality
  - Sonny Sandoval, singer and frontman for P.O.D.
- May 17 – Sendhil Ramamurthy, actor
- May 20 – Allison Amend, novelist
- May 21
  - Fairuza Balk, actress and musician
  - Havoc, born Kejuan Muchita, rapper
- May 22
  - John Bale, baseball player
  - Jason Brown, baseball coach
  - Sean Gunn, actor
  - A. J. Langer, actress
- May 23
  - 4th Disciple, record producer and audio engineer
  - Jewel, singer
- May 24 – Dash Mihok, actor and director
- May 25 – Kevin Hartman, soccer player
- May 27
  - LaShonda Katrice Barnett, author, playwright, and radio host
  - Vanessa Blue, pornographic actress
  - Bubba Copeland, politician, mayor of Smiths Station, Alabama (d. 2023)
  - Marjorie Taylor Greene, politician
- May 28 – Robert Ballecer, Catholic Jesuit priest and podcaster
- May 29
  - Kenny Bynum, football player
  - Steve Cardenas, martial artist and actor
  - Aaron McGruder, cartoonist and writer
- May 30
  - Nicholas Anthony Ascioti, composer
  - David L. Bahnsen, portfolio manager, author, and television commentator
  - Big L, rapper (d. 1999)

=== June ===
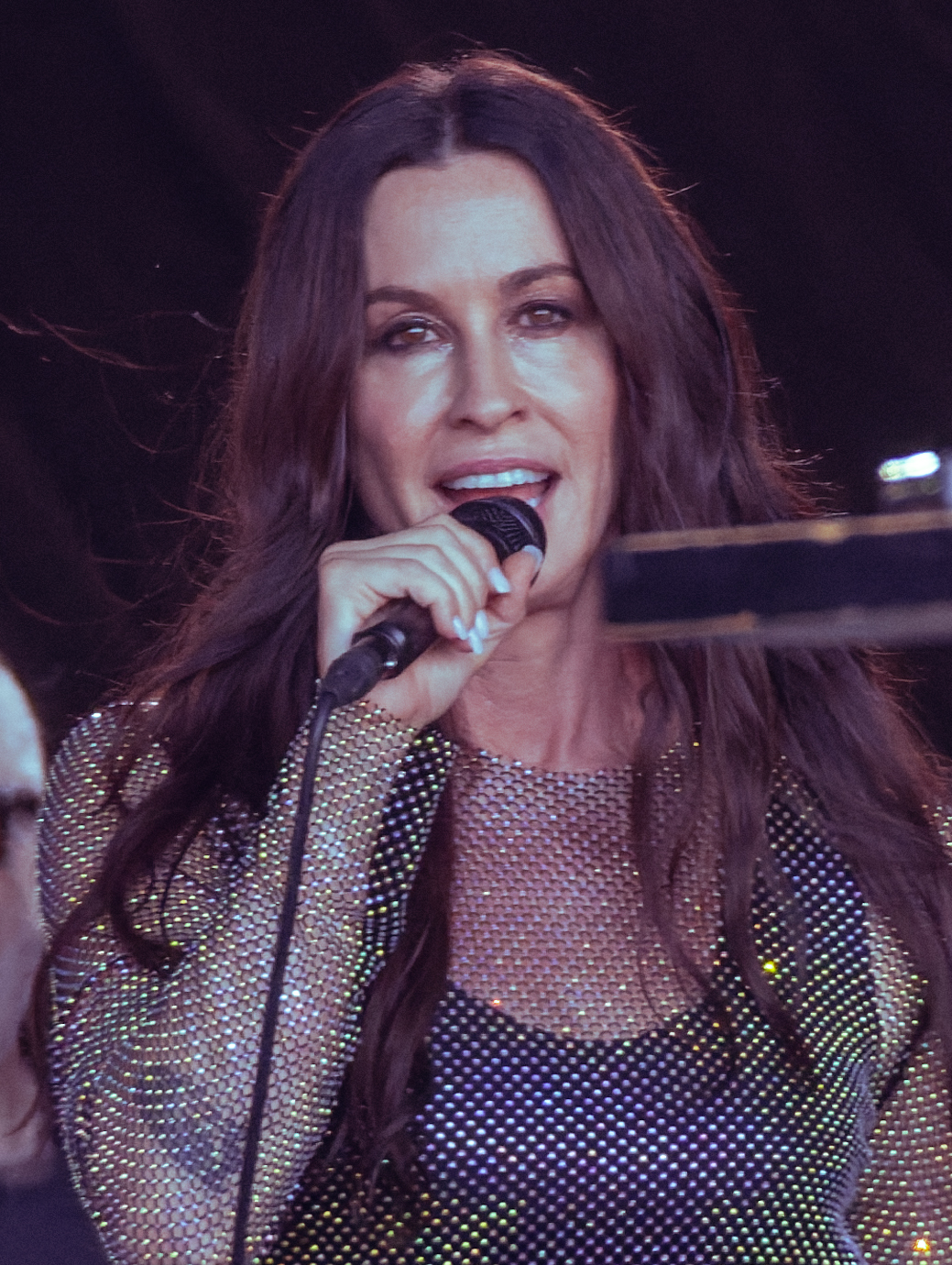
Alanis Morissette

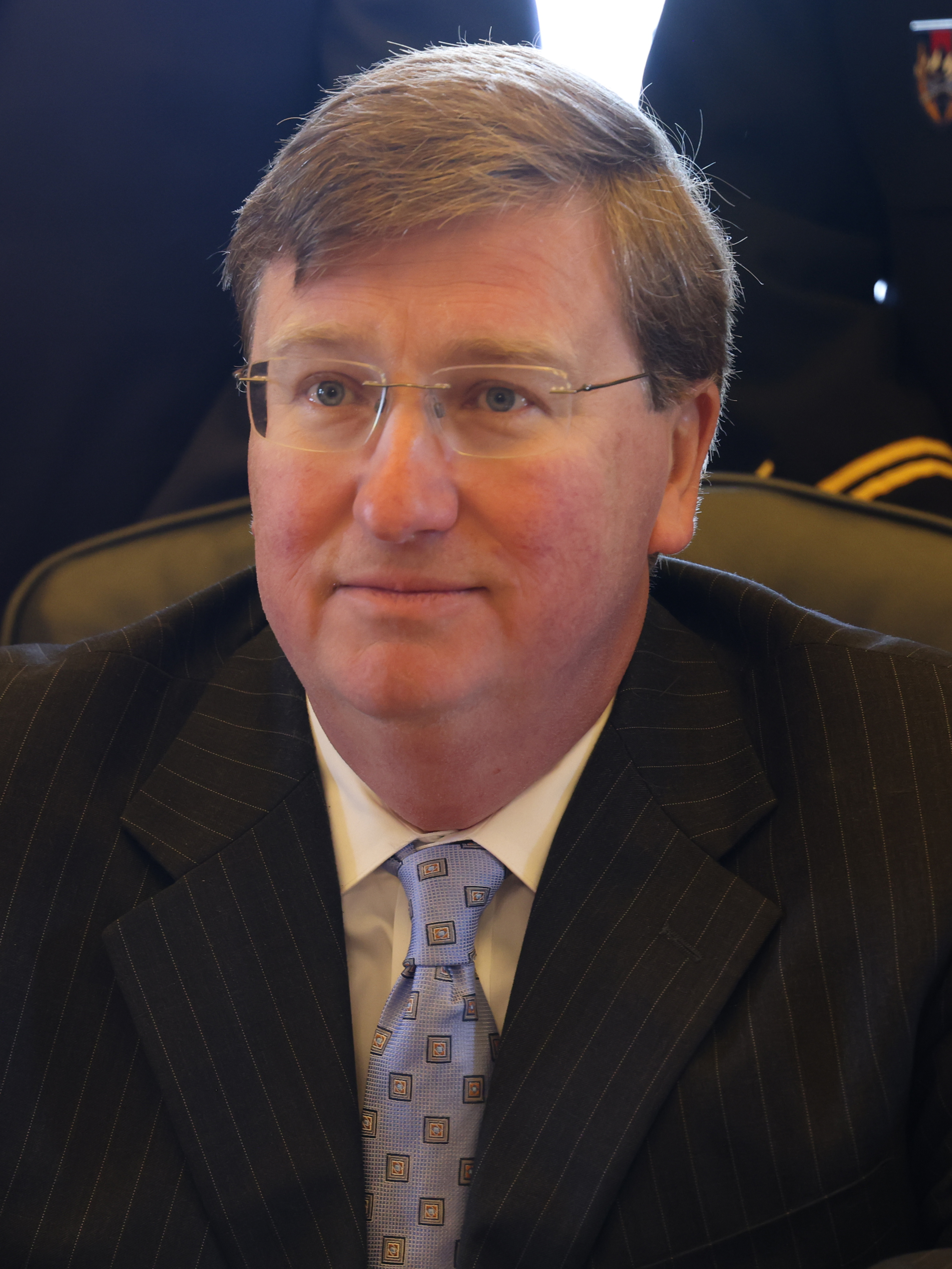
Tate Reeves

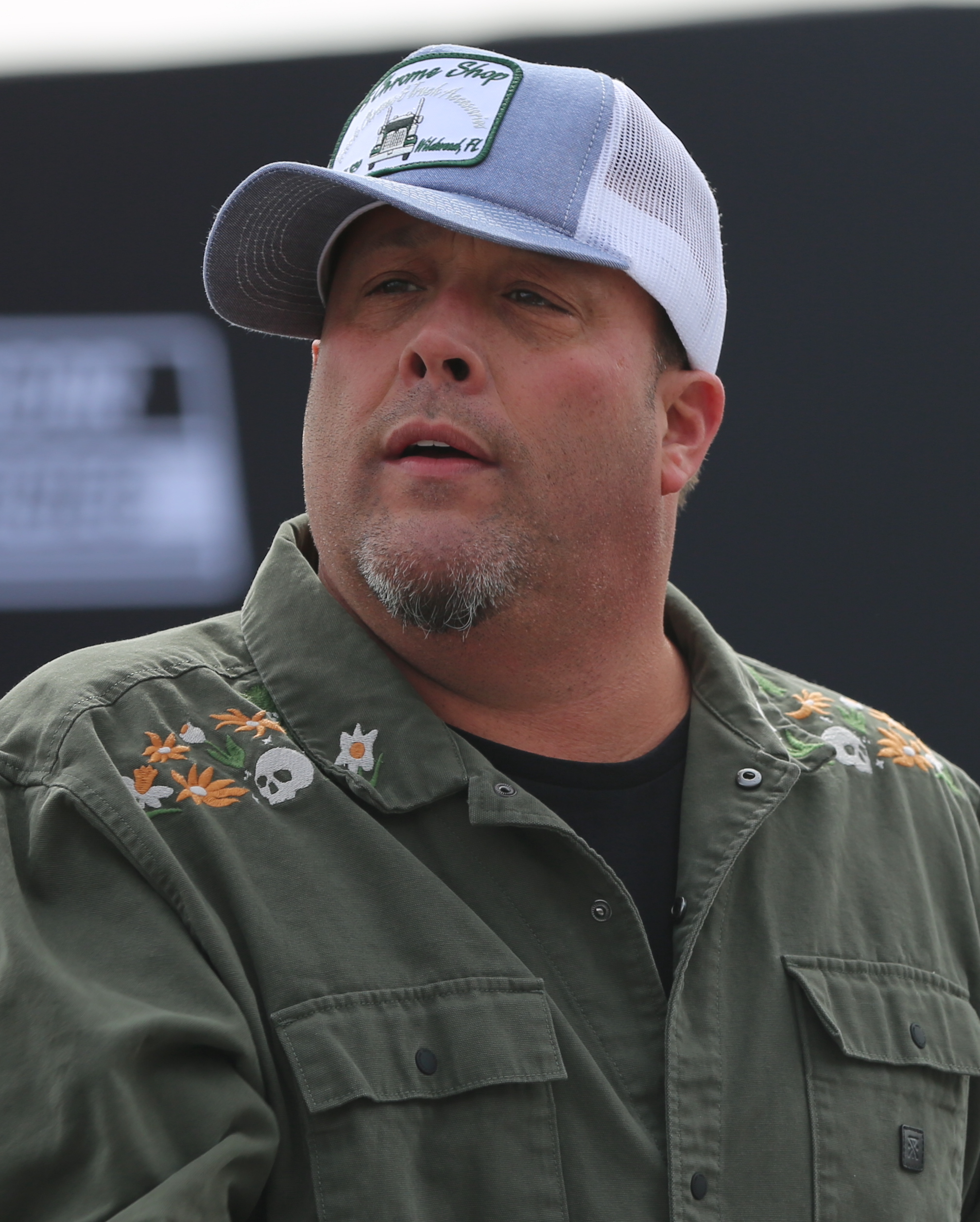
Uncle Kracker

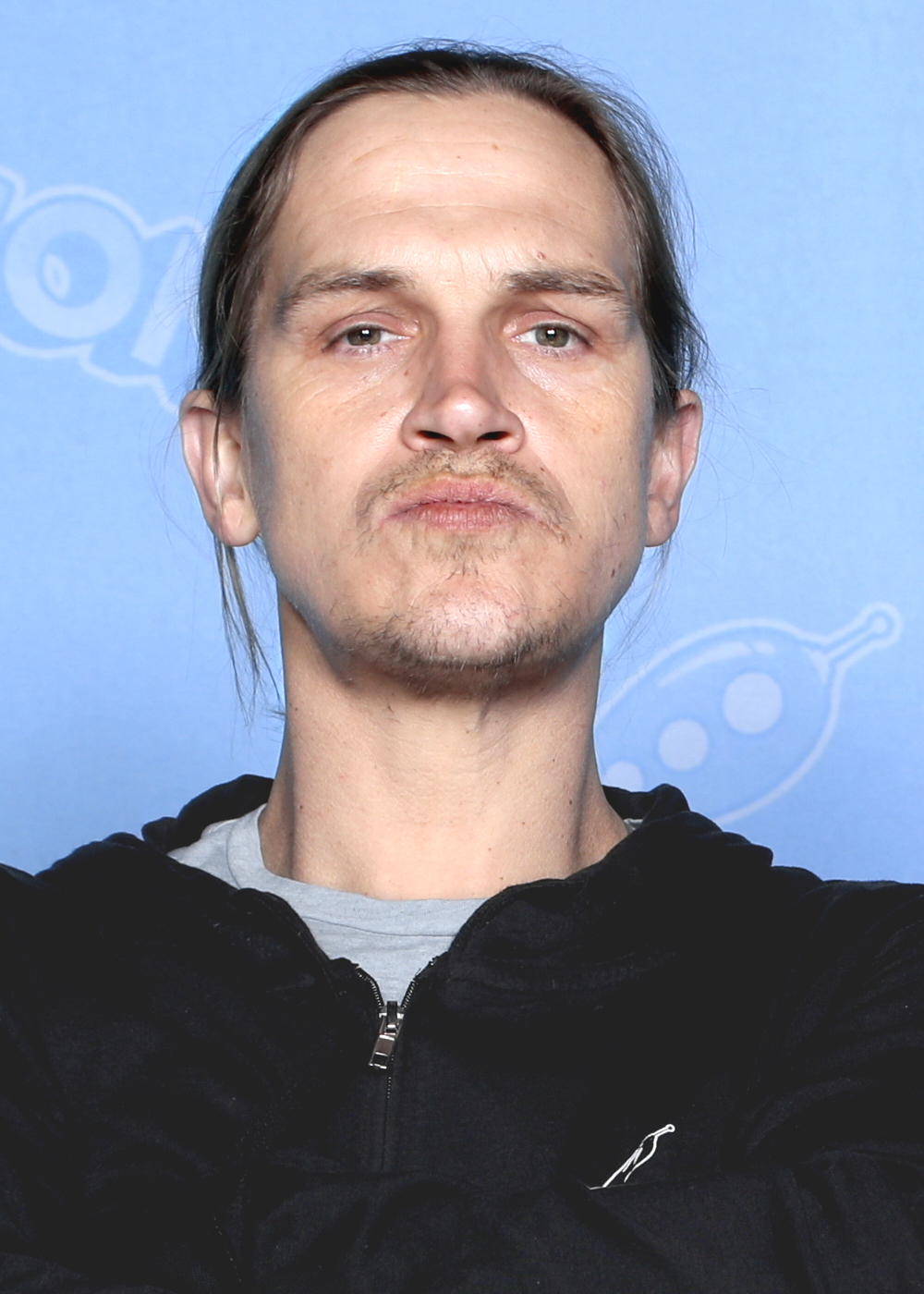
Jason Mewes

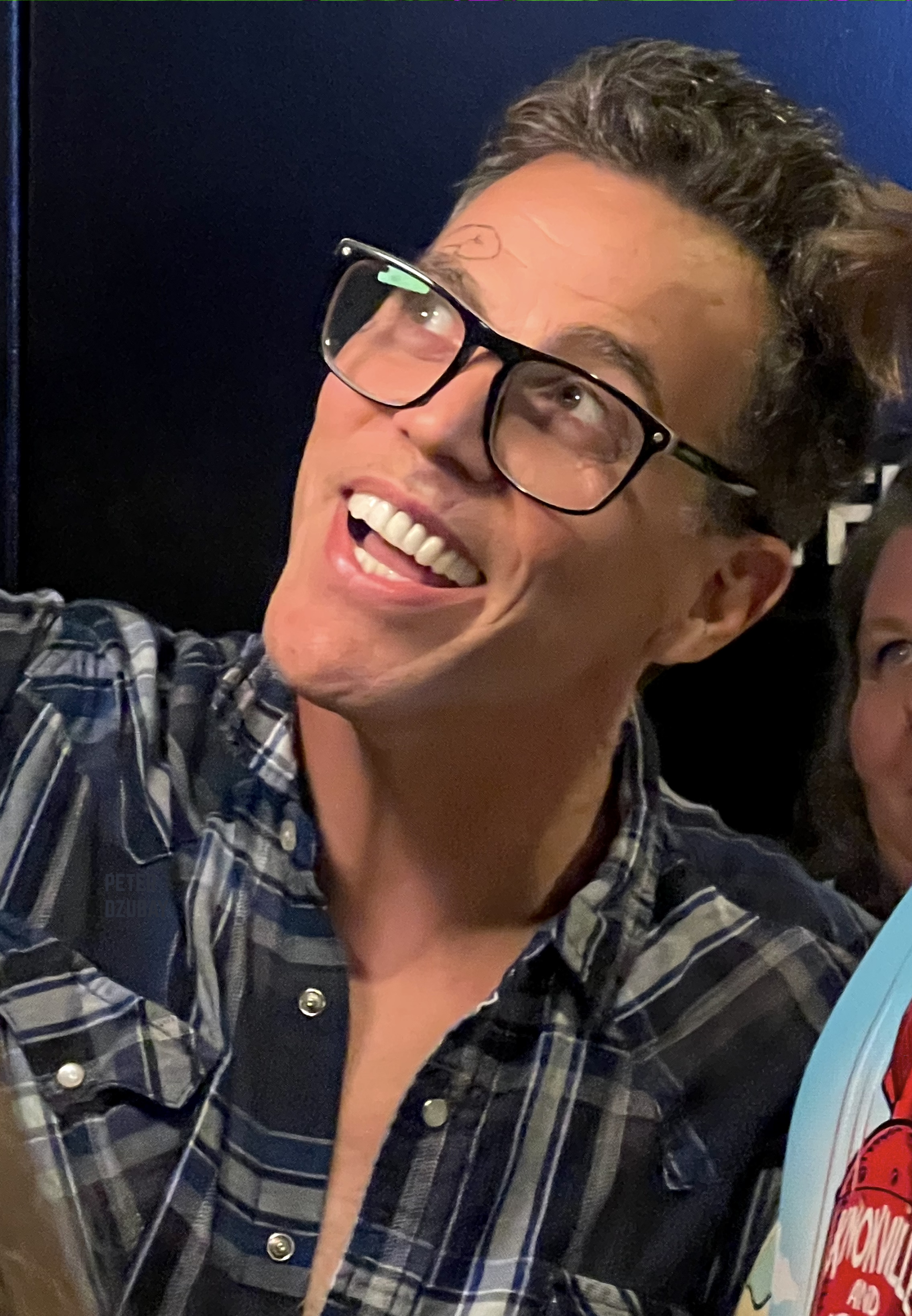
Steve-O

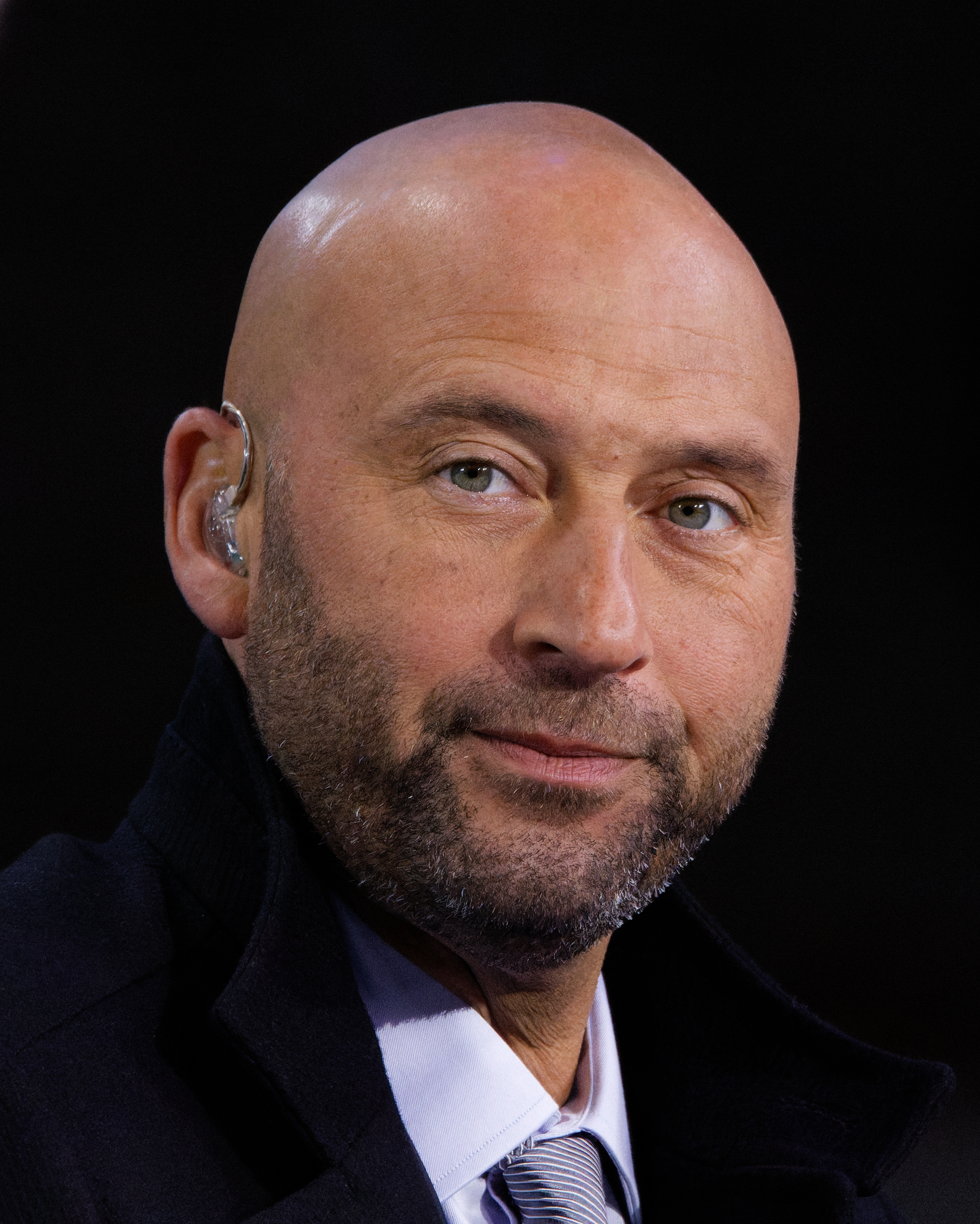
Derek Jeter

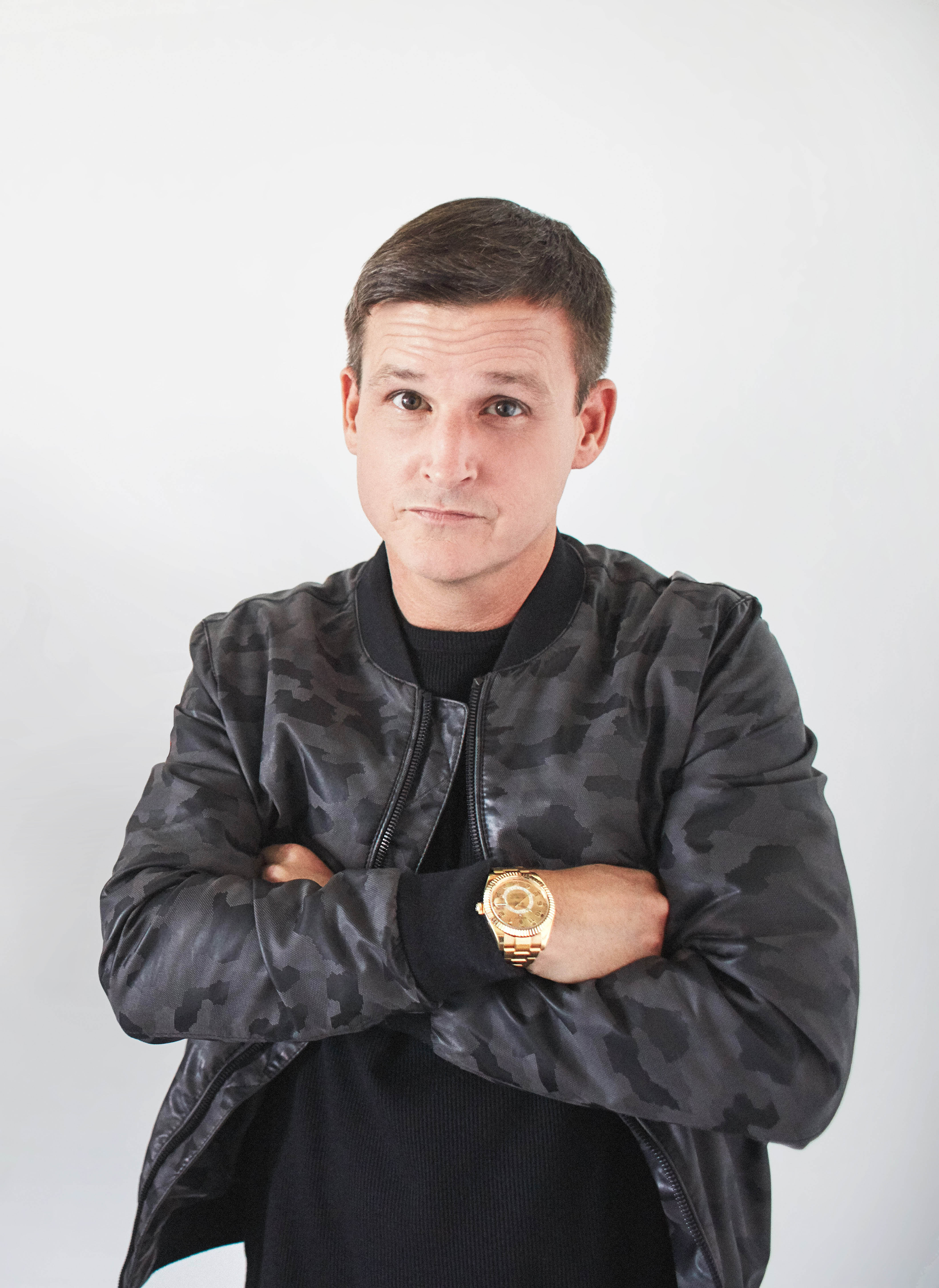
Rob Dyrdek

- June 1 – Alanis Morissette, Canadian-born singer
- June 2 – Gata Kamsky, chess player
- June 5
  - Chad Allen, actor and psychologist
  - Russ Ortiz, baseball player
  - Tate Reeves, politician, 65th Governor of Mississippi
- June 6
  - 2 Tuff Tony, wrestler
  - Uncle Kracker, singer/songwriter and guitarist
- June 7 – Sunshine Anderson, singer/songwriter
- June 8 – Joshua Bloom, astrophysicist and professor
- June 10
  - Dustin Lance Black, screenwriter, director, producer, and LGBT rights activist
  - Bo Butner, drag racer
- June 11
  - Curtis Alexander, football player
  - Lenny Jacobson, actor
- June 12
  - Joseph Blair, basketball player and coach
  - Ronald Brisé, politician
  - Darren Bush, screenwriter, producer, and director
  - Jason Mewes, actor, comedian, producer, and podcaster
  - Brandon Webb, author and Navy SEAL
- June 13
  - Valeri Bure, Russian-born Olympic ice hockey player
  - Steve-O, actor, stunt performer, and television personality
- June 14
  - Rodney Artmore, football player
  - Mike Burke, strongman competitor
  - Raja Gemini, drag performer and make-up artist
- June 15
  - Anthony Atamanuik, writer, actor, and comedian
  - Scott Bomar, musician
- June 17
  - François Audouy, French-born movie production designer
  - Andre Dickens, politician, mayor of Atlanta, Georgia (2022–present)
- June 18 – Les Adams, politician
- June 19 – Bumper Robinson, actor and voice actor
- June 21
  - Michael Brick, journalist and songwriter
  - Pat Downey, football player
  - Maggie Siff, actress
- June 22
  - Boom Bip, record producer and musician
  - Donald Faison, actor
  - Amber O'Neal, wrestler
- June 24 – Vinnie Fiorello, drummer for Less than Jake
- June 25 – Jeff Cohen, attorney and actor
- June 26
  - Anybody Killa, rapper
  - Bisila Bokoko, Spanish-born businesswoman, entrepreneur, speaker and philanthropist
  - Chris Butterfield, football player
  - Jason Craig, artist
  - Derek Jeter, baseball player
  - Jason Kendall, baseball player
  - Matt Striker, wrestler and commentator
- June 27
  - Juran Bolden, football player
  - Christopher O'Neill, British-born businessman and Swedish royal
- June 28
  - Mika Arisaka, Japanese-born singer
  - Rob Dyrdek, skateboarder
- June 30 – Tony Rock, actor

=== July ===
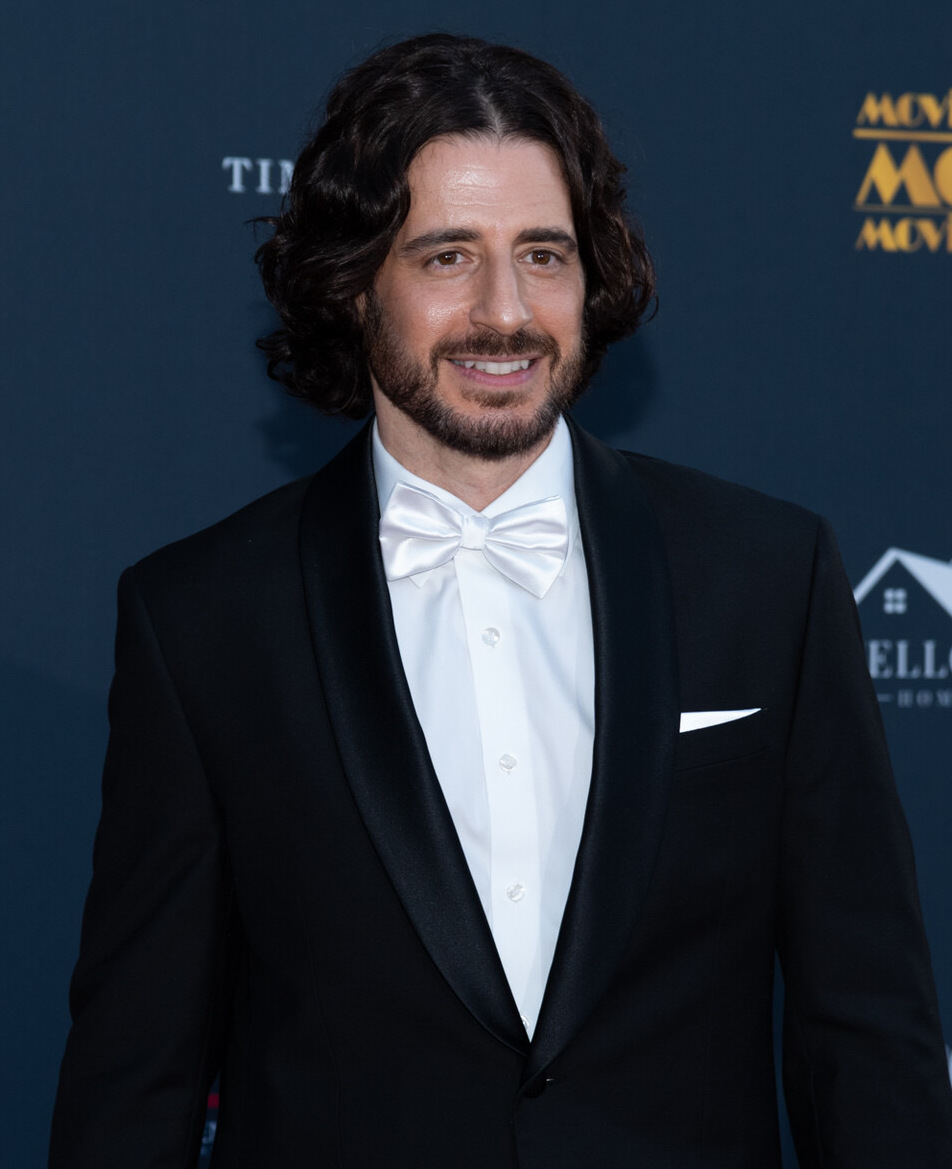
Jonathan Roumie

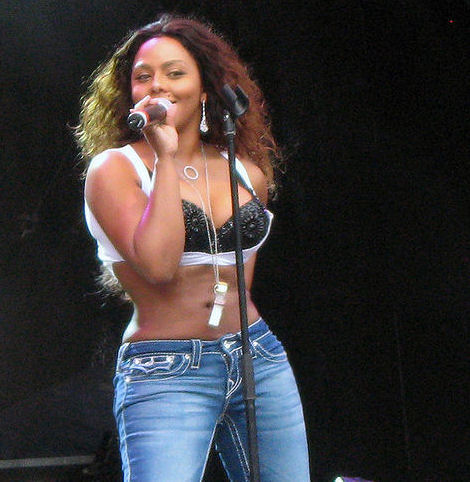
Lil' Kim

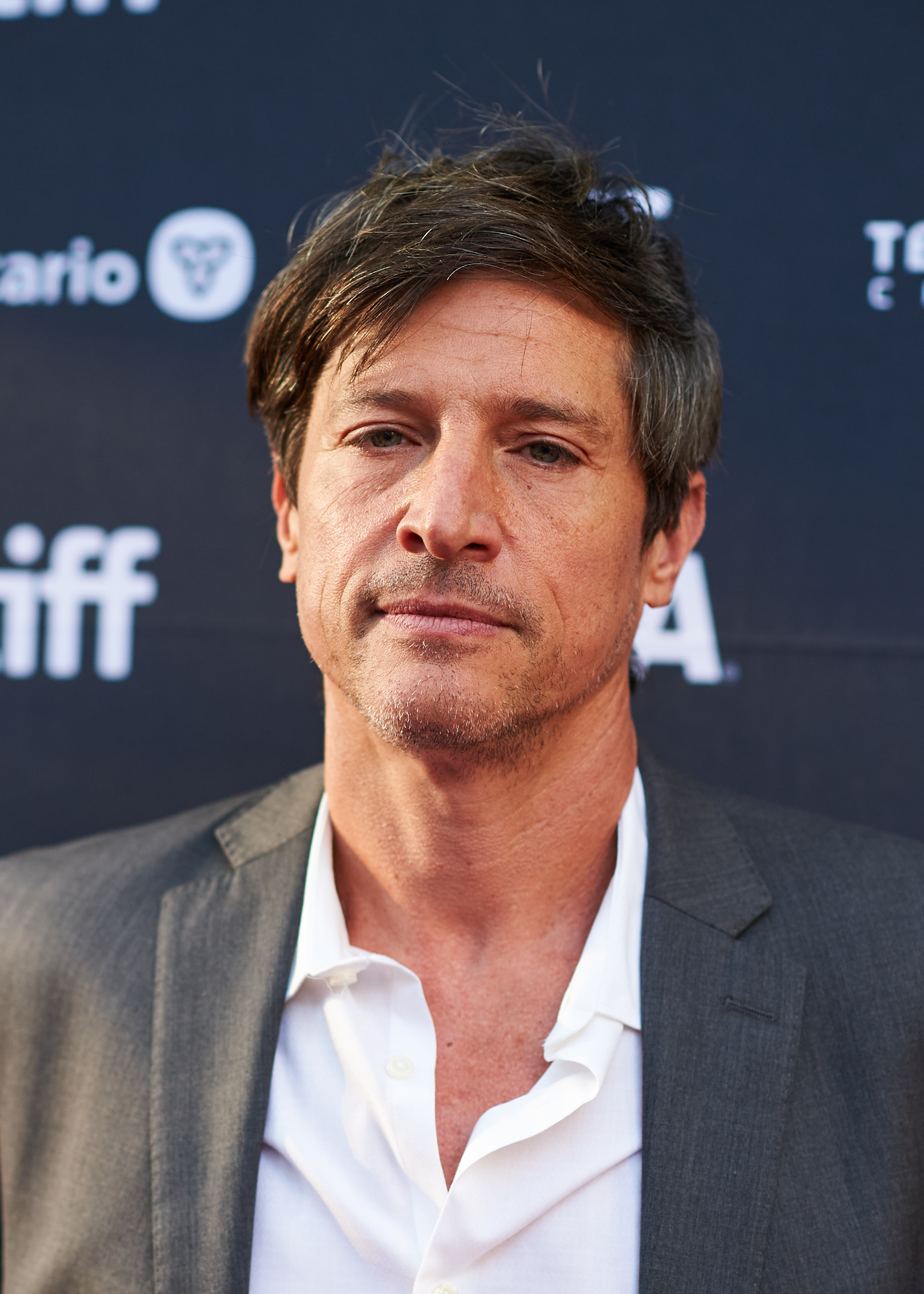
Simon Rex

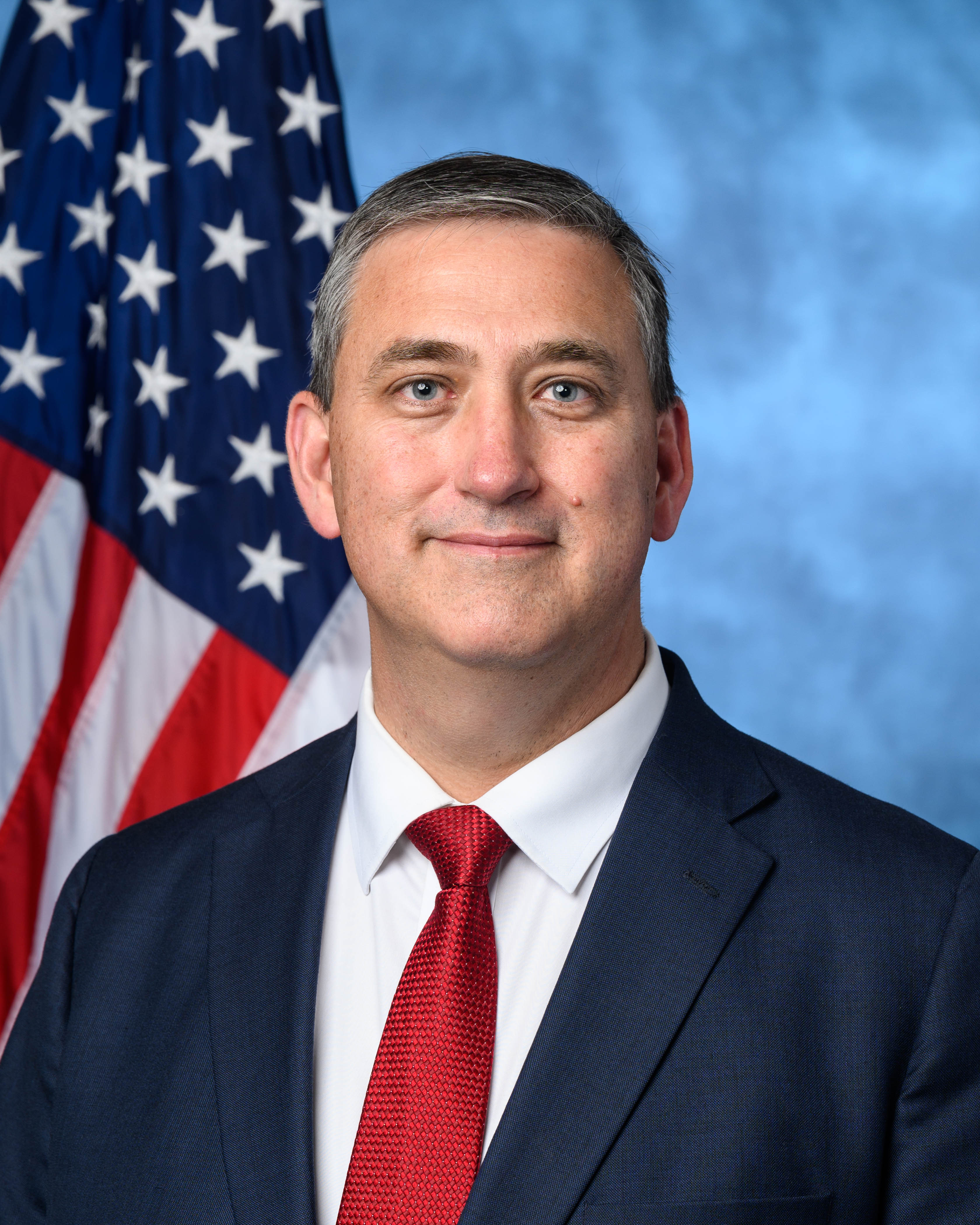
Nathaniel Moran

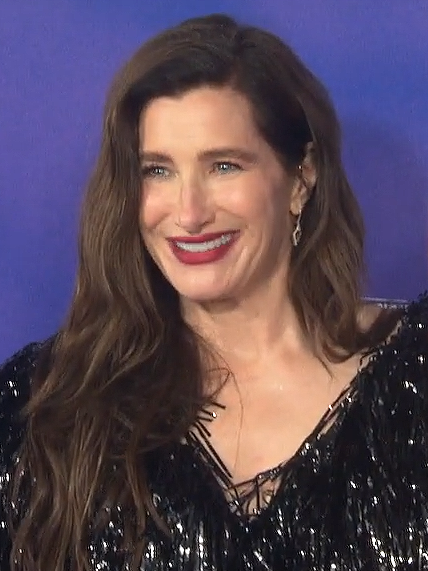
Kathryn Hahn

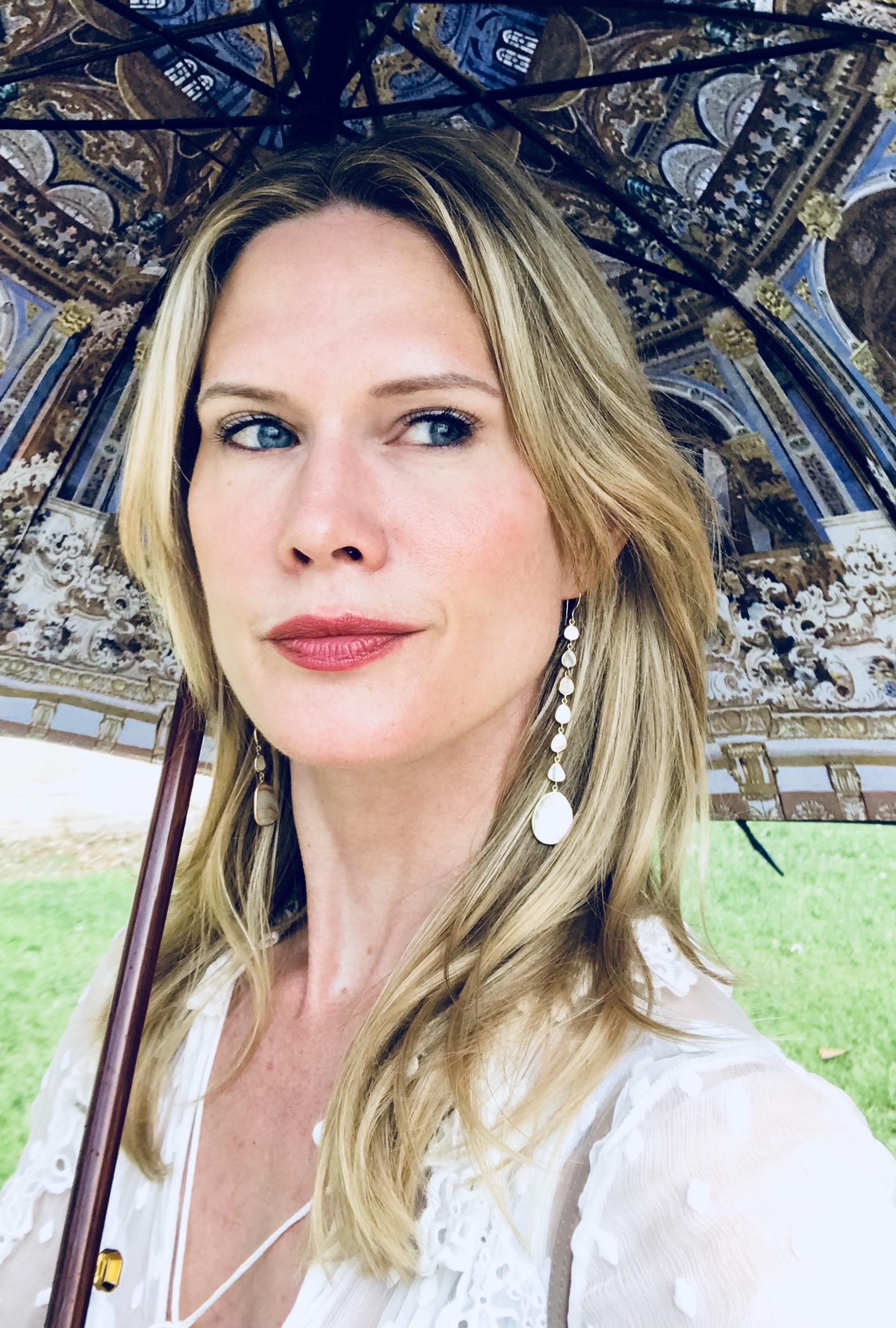
Stephanie March

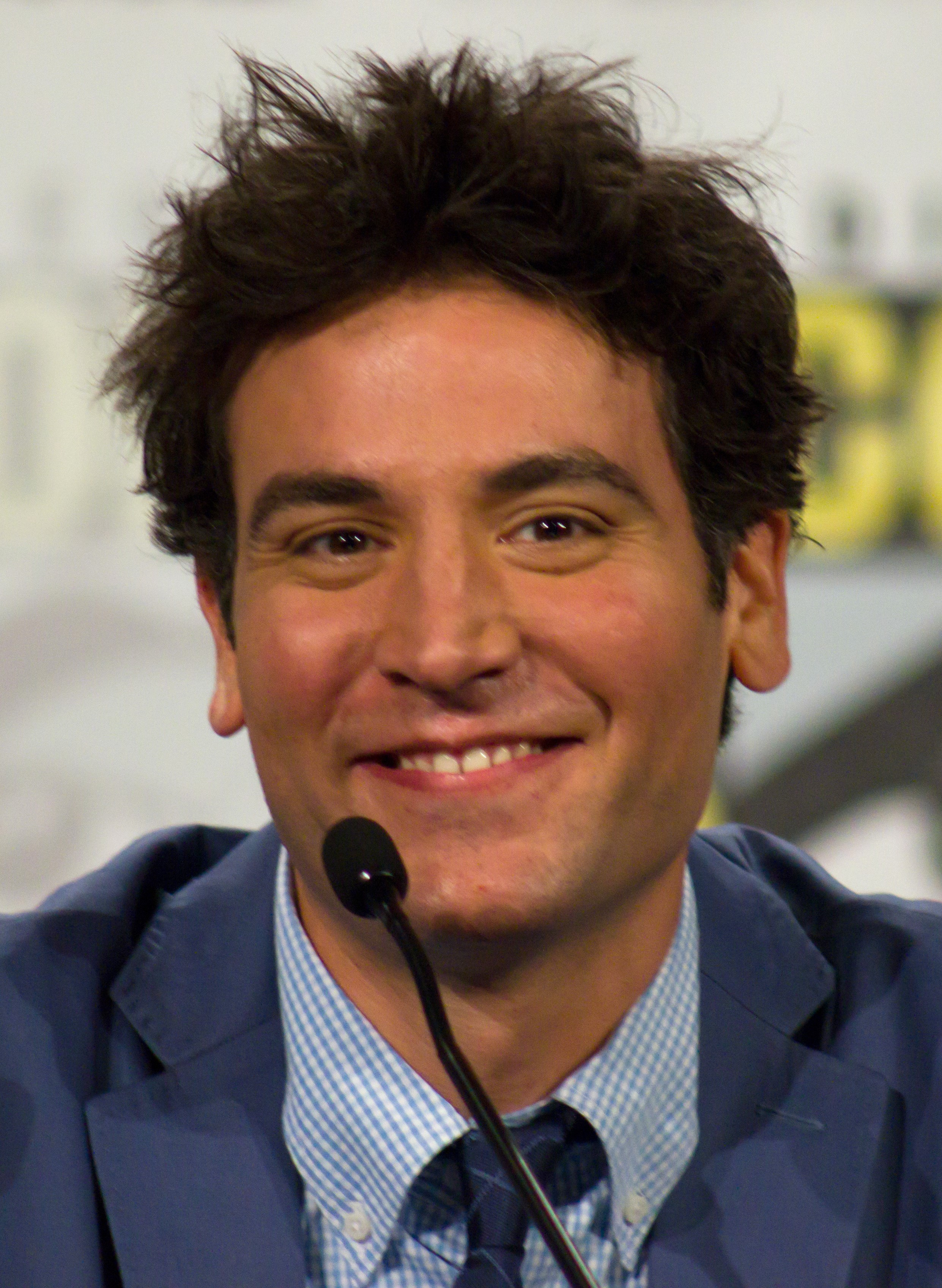
Josh Radnor

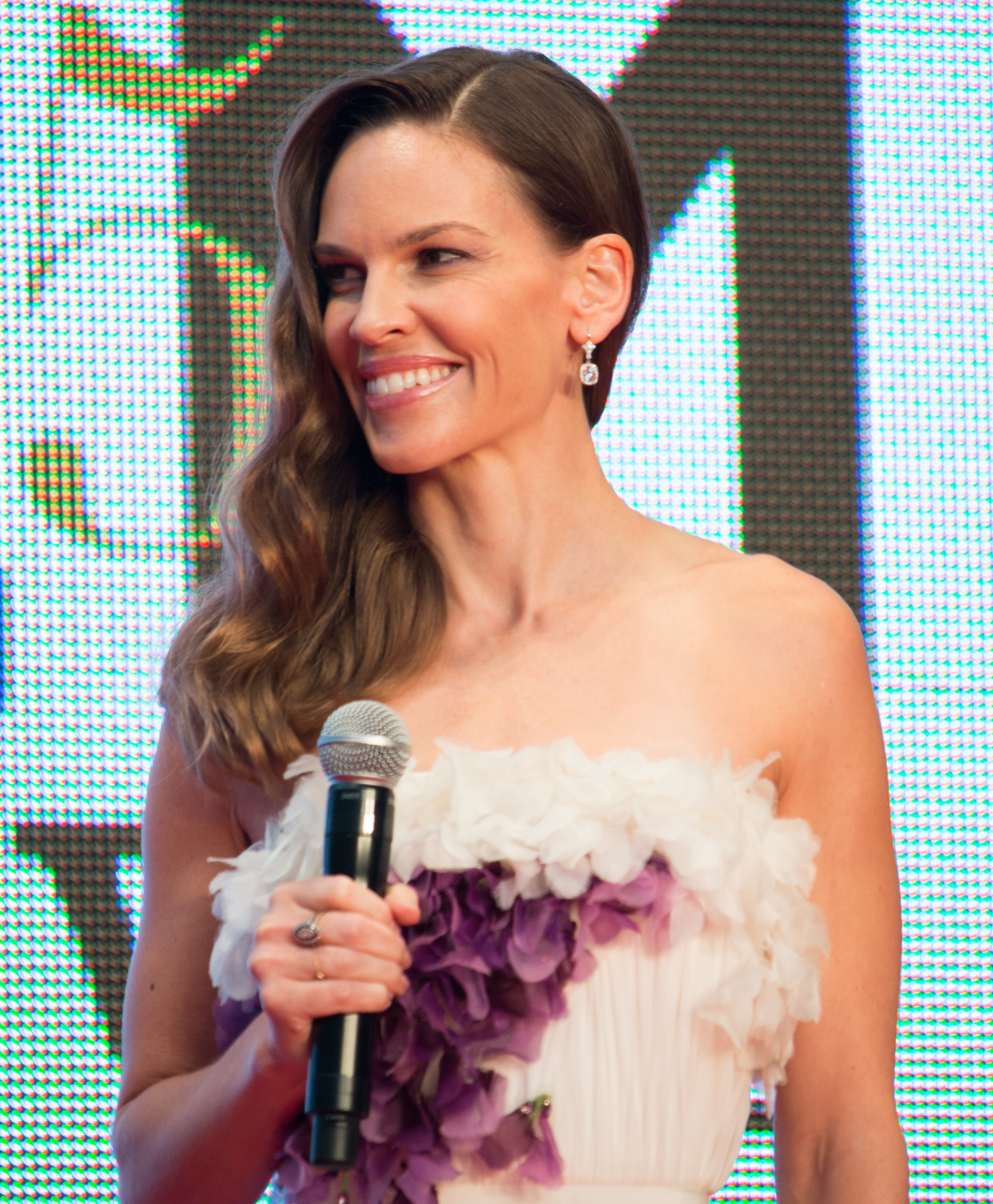
Hilary Swank

- July 1
  - Jonathan Roumie, actor
  - Philip Shahbaz, actor and voice actor
- July 2
  - Kevin Bankston, attorney and Privacy Policy Director for Facebook
  - Rocky Gray, musician
- July 3
  - Alli Abrew, football player
  - Chris Brown, football player and coach
  - Corey Reynolds, actor
- July 4
  - Steve Bush, football player
  - Mick Wingert, voice actor and voice-over coach
- July 6
  - Clarence Adams, boxer
  - Grant Bond, comic book artist and writer
- July 7
  - Juan Manuel Benítez, Spanish-born journalist
  - Dialleo Burks, football player and coach
- July 8 – Danny Ardoin, baseball player
- July 10
  - Jim Annunziato, recording engineer
  - Brian Thompson, businessman (d. 2024)
- July 11
  - Neal Acree, composer
  - Blueprint, rapper
  - Lil' Kim, rapper and television personality
- July 12
  - Keith Allen, football player
  - Sam Garnes, football player, coach, and radio personality
  - Gregory Helms, wrestler
  - Ryan Lizza, journalist
- July 13 – Shaun Baker, actor and martial artist
- July 14 – Mark Butterfield, football player
- July 15 – Mitty Arnold, tennis player
- July 16
  - Jeremy Enigk, singer/songwriter and guitarist, frontman for Sunny Day Real Estate
  - Ryan McCombs, singer-songwriter and guitarist, frontman for Drowning Pool
  - Chris Pontius, actor, stunt performer, and television personality
- July 18
  - Allan Amato, photographer and filmmaker
  - Michael Dante DiMartino, animator
- July 19
  - Jeremy Borash, wrestling commentator, announcer, interviewer, and producer
  - Dorian Brew, football player
- July 20 – Simon Rex, actor, comedian, and rapper
- July 21 – Steve Byrne, comedian and actor
- July 22
  - Nathaniel Moran, judge and politician
  - Johnny Strong, actor
- July 23
  - Larry Barnes, baseball player
  - Maurice Greene, Olympic sprinter
  - Kathryn Hahn, actress
  - Stephanie March, actress
- July 24
  - Eva Aridjis, Dutch-born Mexican-American director and screenwriter
  - Boogie2988, YouTuber
- July 25 – Lauren Faust, animator
- July 26
  - Christophe Brown, American-born Swiss ice hockey player
  - Gary Owen, actor and comedian
- July 27
  - Benjamin P. Ablao Jr., actor and filmmaker
  - Myron Butler, gospel singer/songwriter
- July 28
  - Afroman, rapper, singer/songwriter, comedian, musician, and political candidate
  - Derek Anderson, basketball player
  - Elizabeth Berkley, actress
  - Irene Ng, Malaysian-born actress and teacher
- July 29
  - Aisha N. Braveboy, politician
  - Josh Radnor, actor
- July 30 – Hilary Swank, actress
- July 31 – Adam Putnam, politician

=== August ===
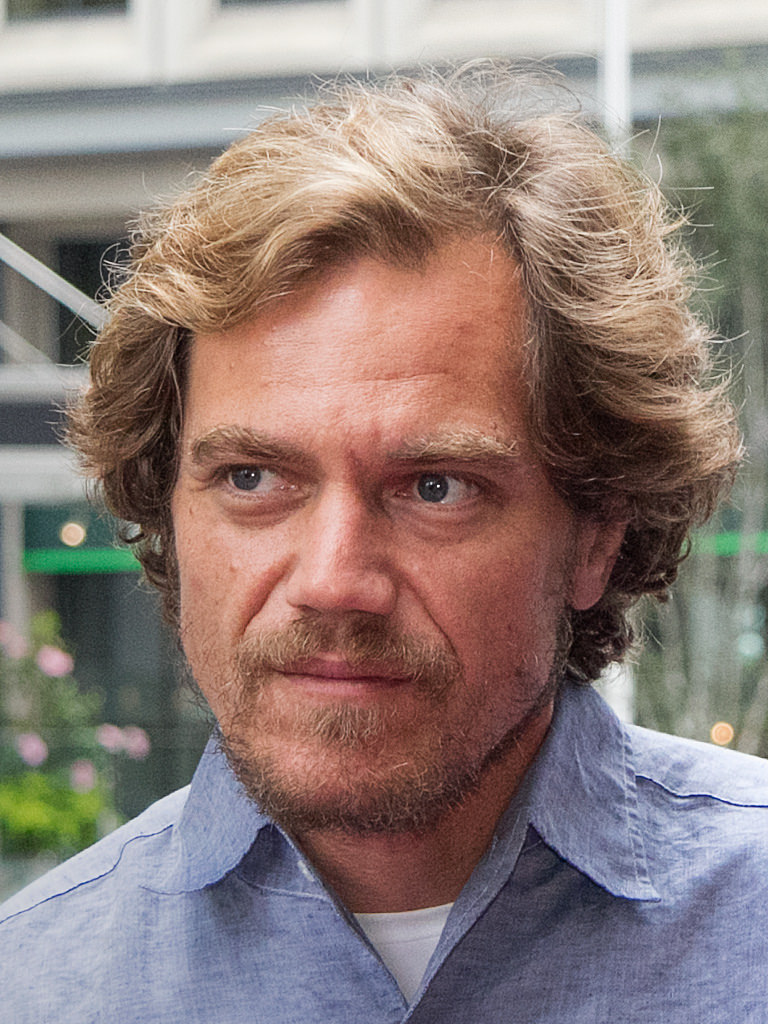
Michael Shannon

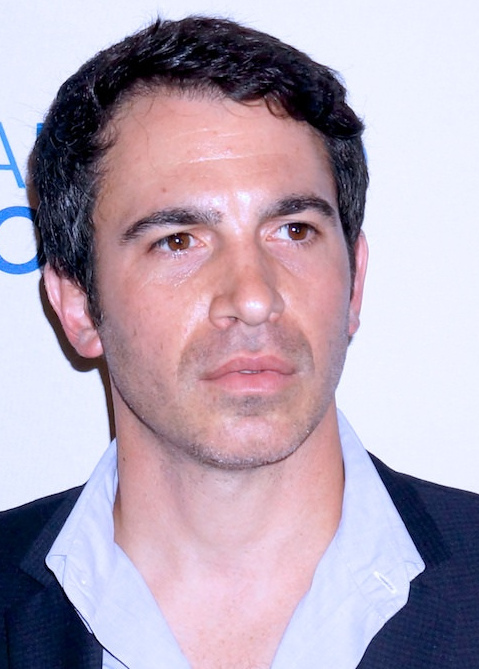
Chris Messina

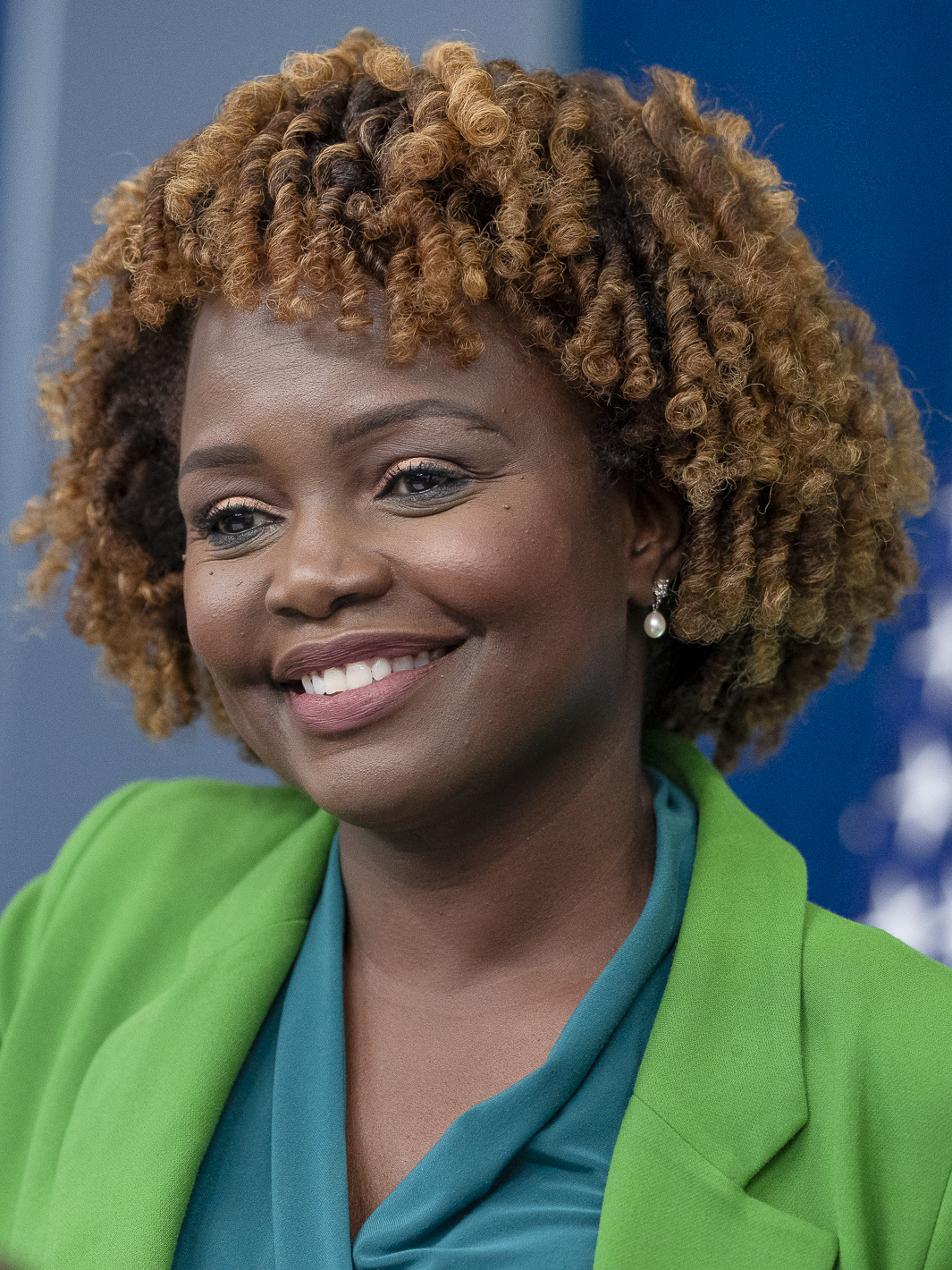
Karine Jean-Pierre

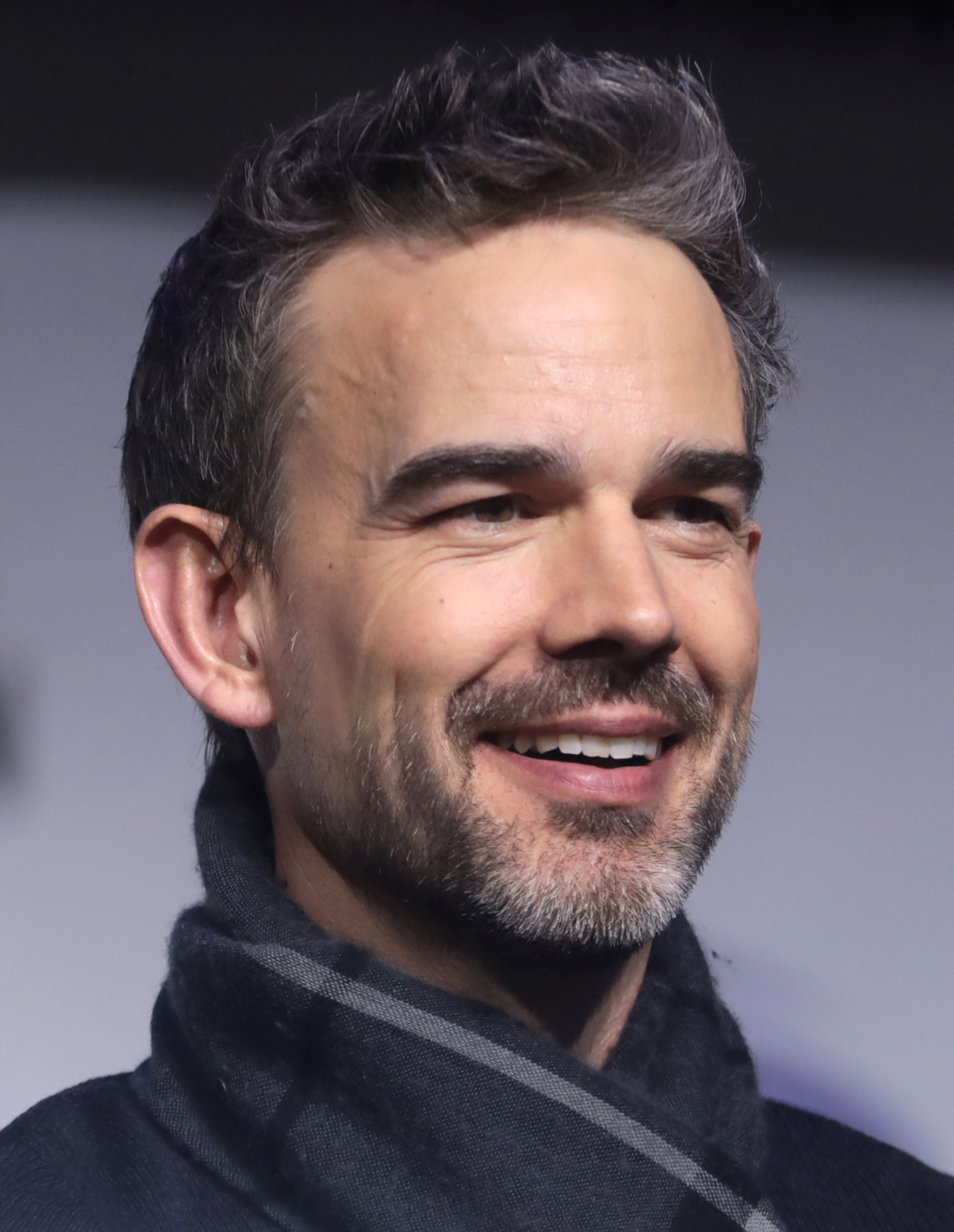
Christopher Gorham

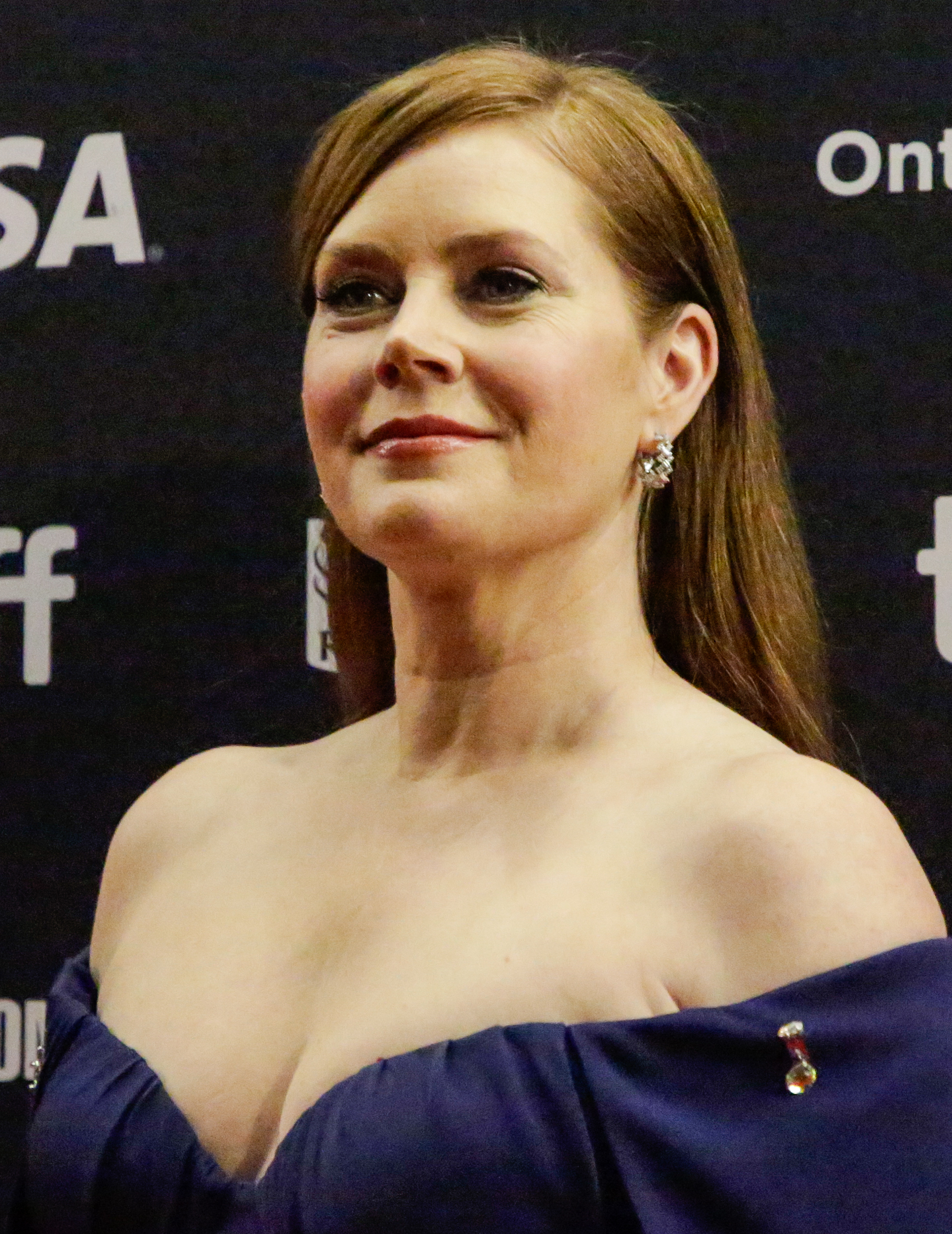
Amy Adams

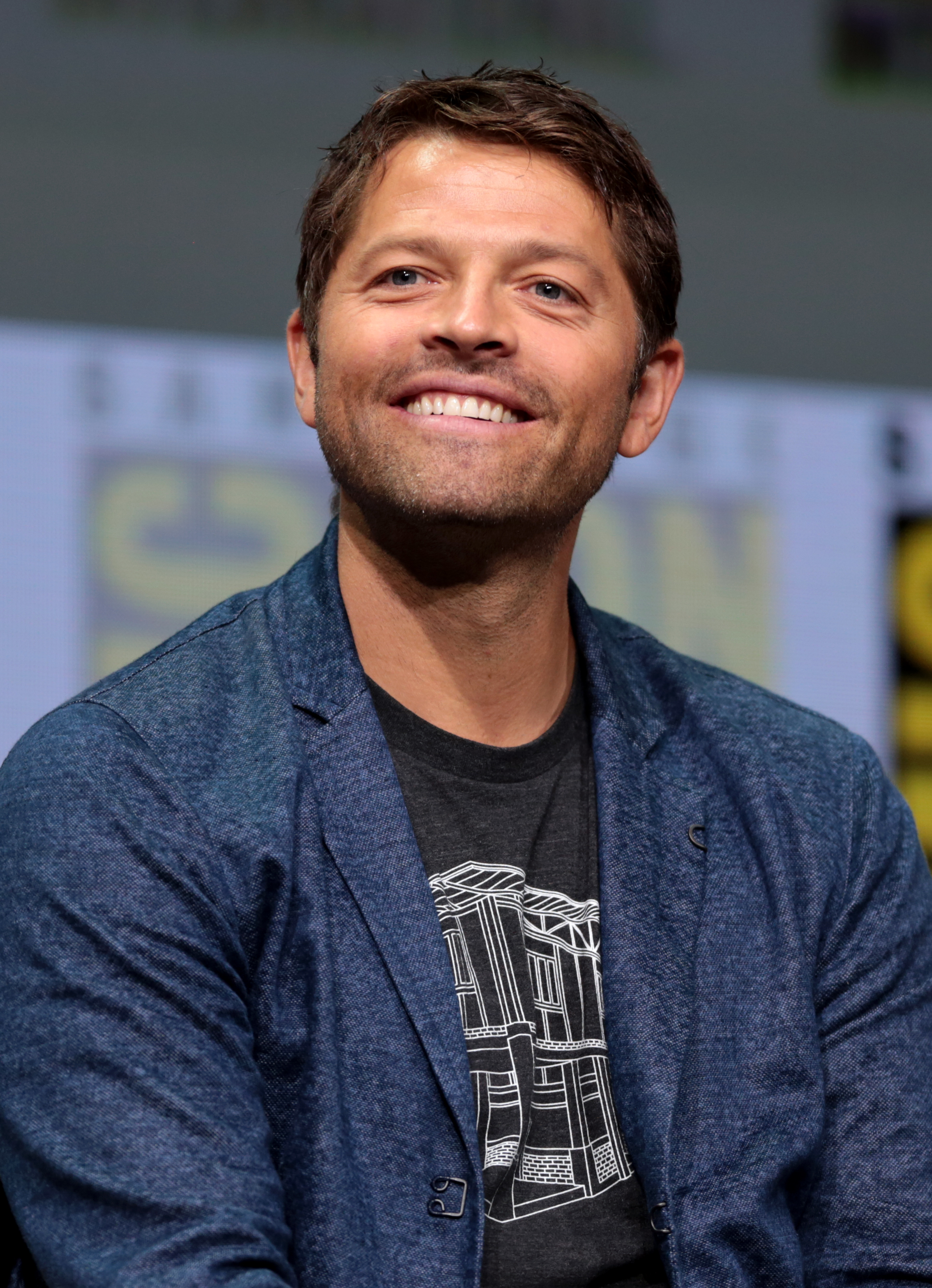
Misha Collins

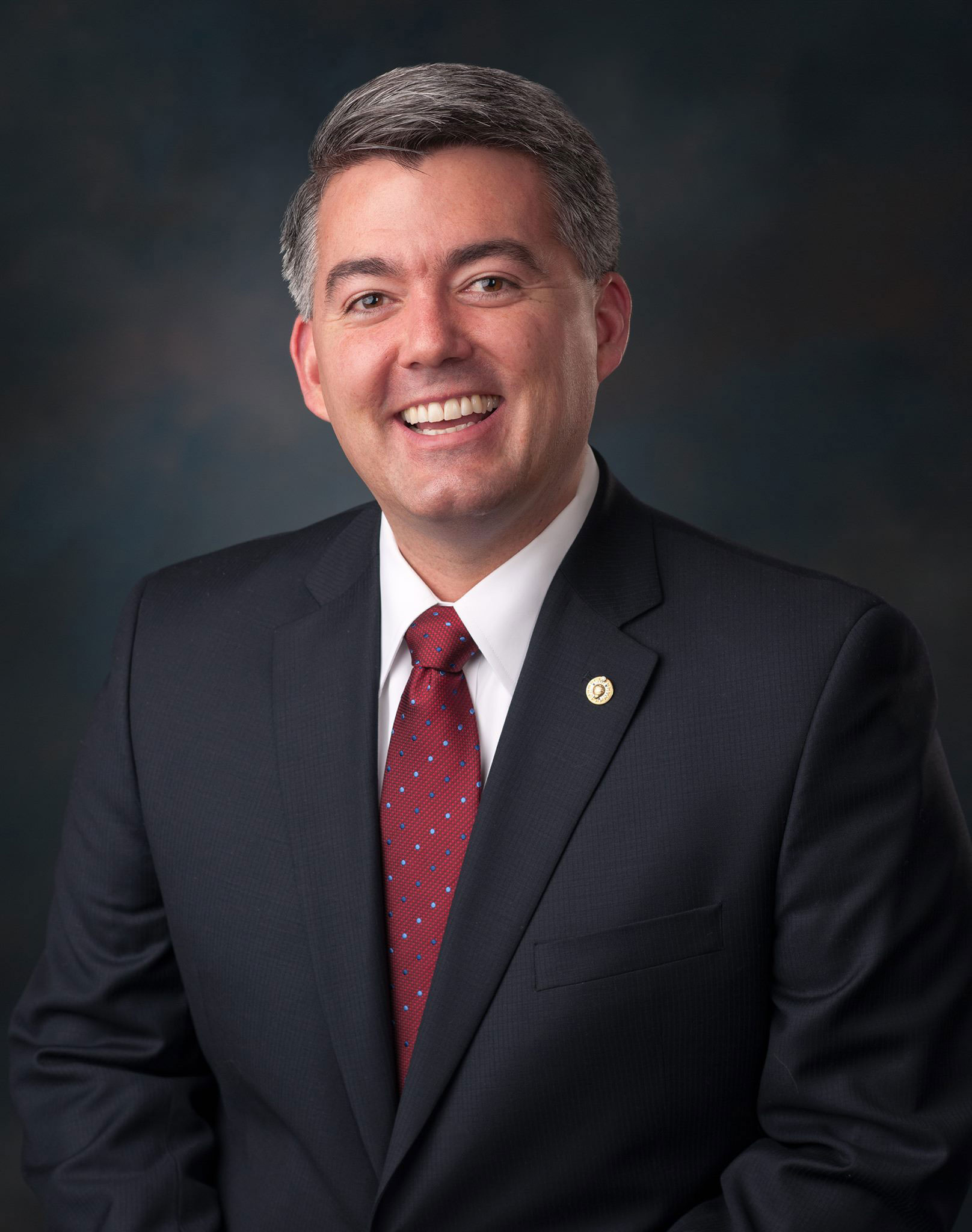
Cory Gardner

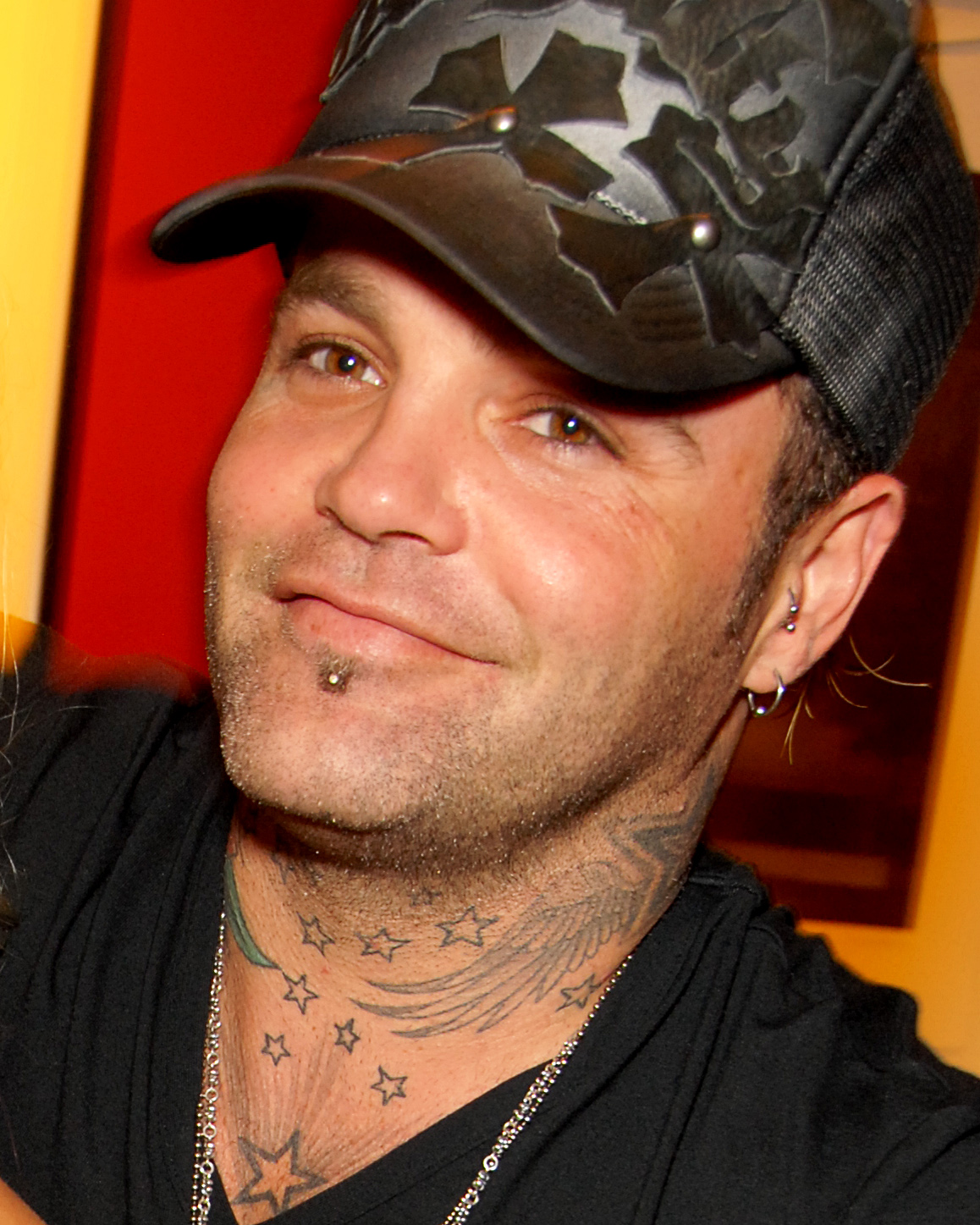
Shifty Shellshock

- August 1
  - BlackOwned C-Bone, rapper and member of Dungeon Family
  - Justin Baughman, baseball player
  - Matt Braunger, actor, writer, and comedian
- August 2
  - Angel Boris, model and actress
  - Zach Brock, jazz violinist and composer
- August 3
  - Brad Baker, stock car racing driver
  - Jenny Beck, actress
  - Aimee Bruder, Paralympic swimmer
  - Derek Grimm, professional basketball player
  - Mollie Hemingway, author, columnist, and political commentator
- August 4 – Mike Bajakian, football coach
- August 6
  - Ever Carradine, actress
  - Max Kellerman, sports television personality, host, and boxing commentator
- August 7
  - Chico Benymon, actor
  - Jeff Buckey, football player
  - Michael Shannon, actor
- August 8
  - Jeff Belanger, author
  - Manjul Bhargava, Canadian-born mathematician
  - Mike Budnik, mixed martial artist and in-line skater
- August 9
  - Seth Appert, ice hockey player and coach
  - Dan Cox, politician
  - Derek Fisher, basketball player
- August 10
  - Bonzai Kid, wrestler
  - Mario J. Bruno, Spanish-born business executive and chief executive officer for the American Red Cross
- August 11
  - London Breed, politician, mayor of San Francisco, California (2018–present)
  - Chris Messina, actor and film director
- August 12
  - Arj Barker, comedian and actor
  - Andrea Brady, poet and lecturer
- August 13 – Orlando Anderson, gangster and suspected murderer (d. 1998)
- August 14
  - Chucky Atkins, basketball player
  - Christopher Gorham, actor
- August 16
  - Edwin E. Aguilar, Salvadoran-born animator and storyboard artist (d. 2021)
  - Charli Baltimore, rapper, actress, and television personality
- August 17 – Dmitry Alimov, Russian-born entrepreneur and investor
- August 19 – David Patten, footballer (died 2021)
- August 20
  - Amy Adams, actress
  - Big Moe, rapper (d. 2007)
  - Crunchy Black, rapper for Three 6 Mafia
  - Misha Collins, actor
- August 21
  - Kay Cannon, screenwriter, producer, director, and actress
  - Umar Johnson, psychologist
- August 22
  - Cory Gardner, politician
  - Jenna Leigh Green, actress and singer
  - Bo Koster, keyboardist for My Morning Jacket
  - Iris Kyle, bodybuilder
- August 23
  - Derek Almstead, musician and engineer
  - Mark Bellhorn, baseball player
  - Christian Beranek, writer, actress, musician, and producer
  - Shifty Shellshock, singer and frontman for Crazy Town (d. 2024)
- August 24
  - Archie Amerson, American-born Canadian football player
  - Jennifer Lien, actress
- August 25 – Darren Benson, football player
- August 26
  - Kiran Chetry, news anchor and journalist
  - Meredith Eaton, actress
- August 27
  - James Arciero, politician
  - George Blades, boxer
- August 28
  - Duncan Arsenault, drummer
  - Jen Kirkman, comedian, screenwriter, podcaster, and actress
- August 29
  - Claude Coleman Jr., drummer for Ween
  - Mario Winans, R&B singer/songwriter and record producer
- August 30
  - Anjali Bhimani, actress
  - Rich Cronin, singer and member of LFO (d. 2010)
- August 31 – William Consovoy, conservative advocate (d. 2023)

=== September ===
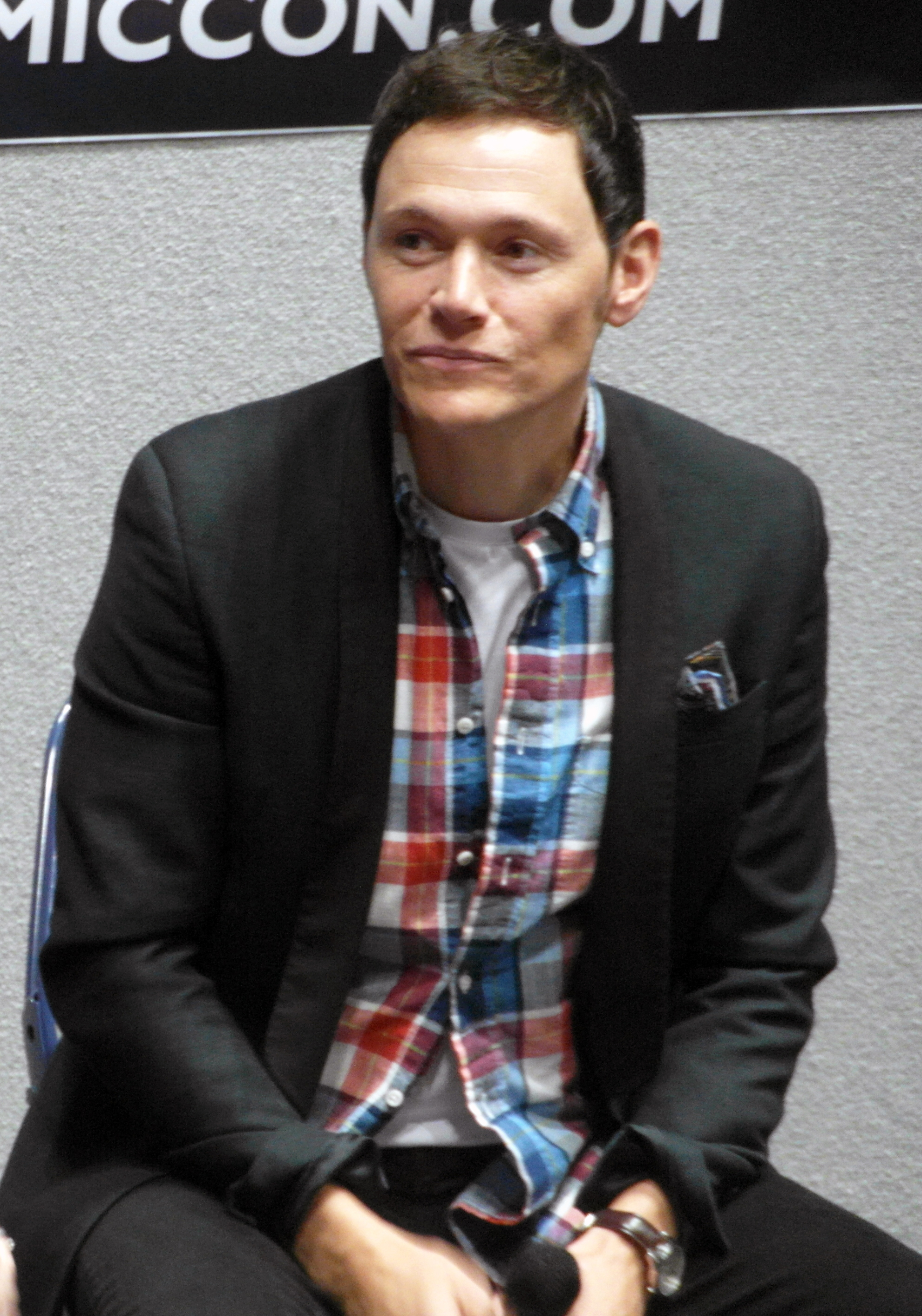
Burn Gorman

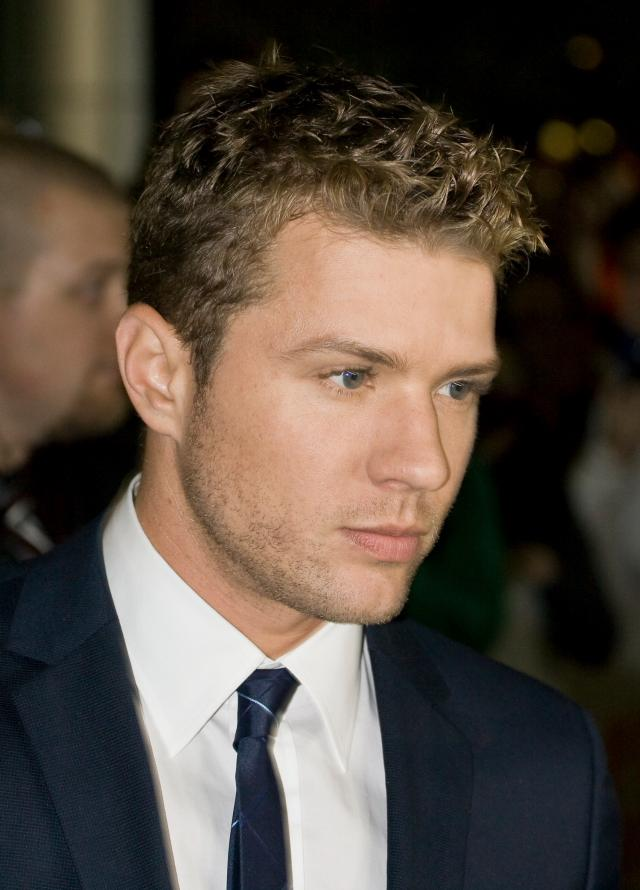
Ryan Phillippe

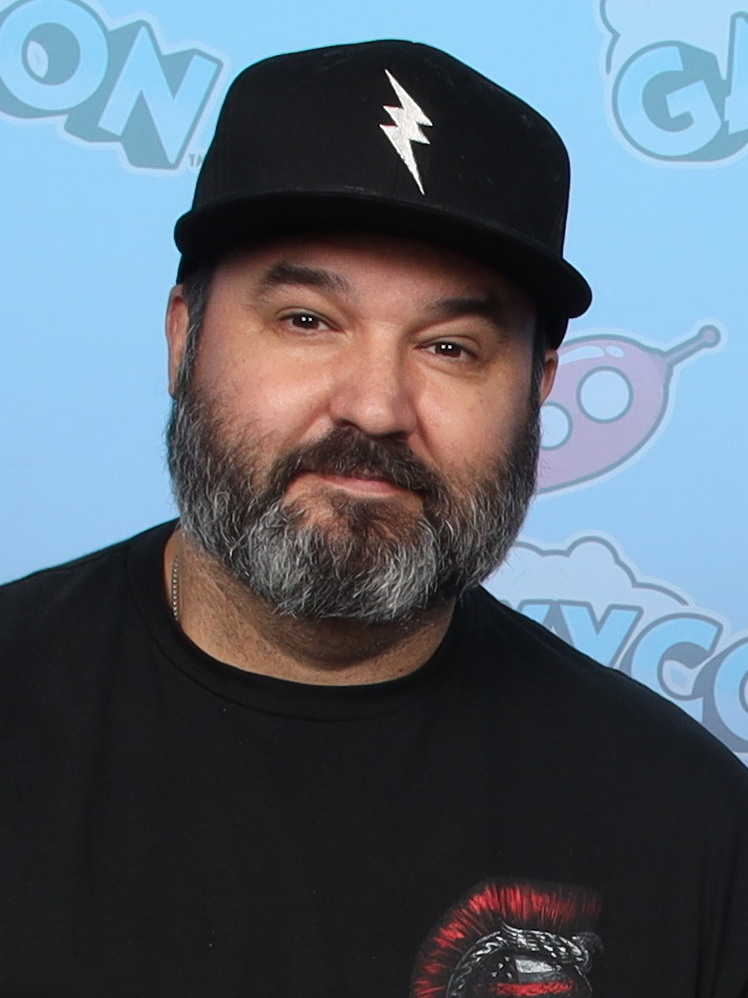
Austin St. John

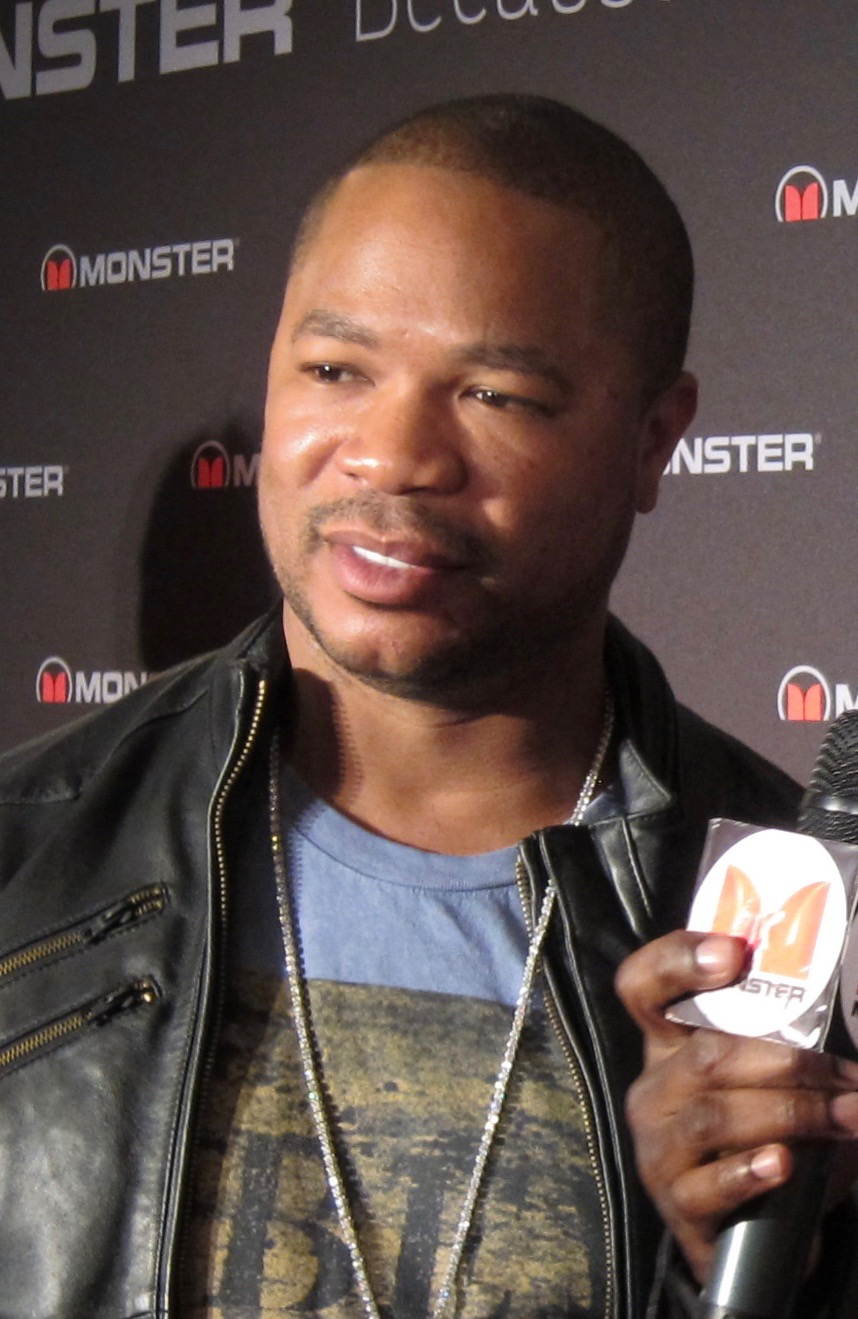
Xzibit

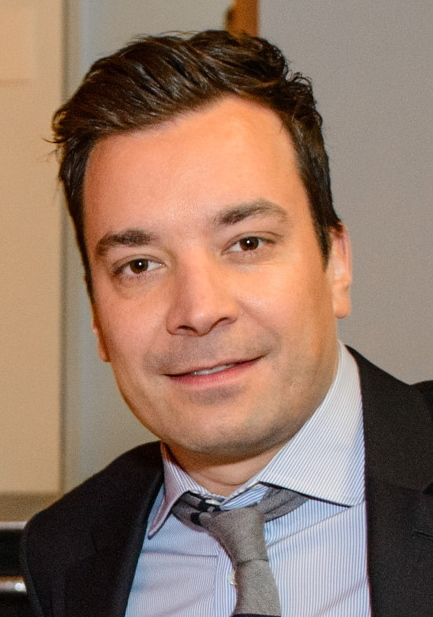
Jimmy Fallon

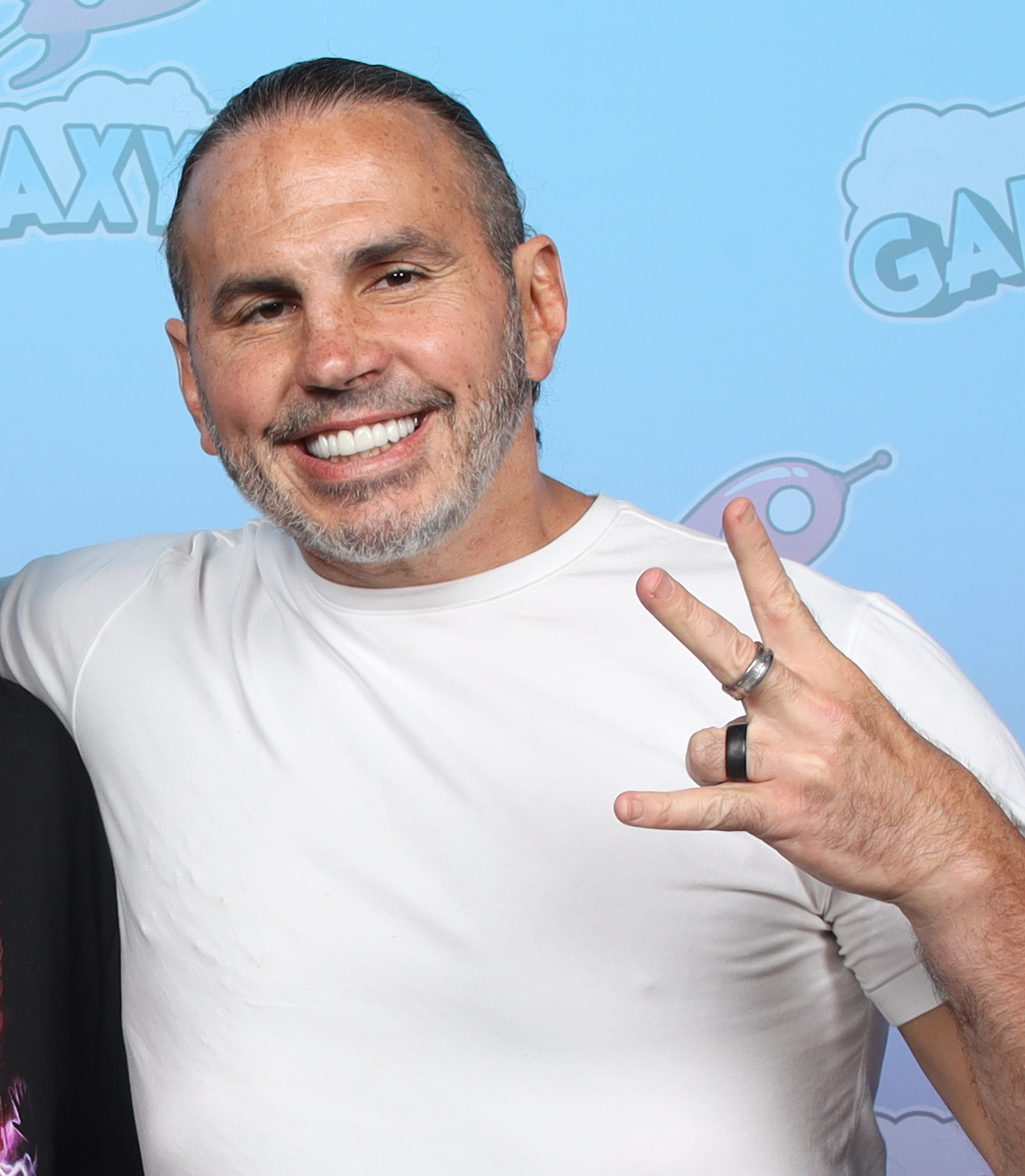
Matt Hardy

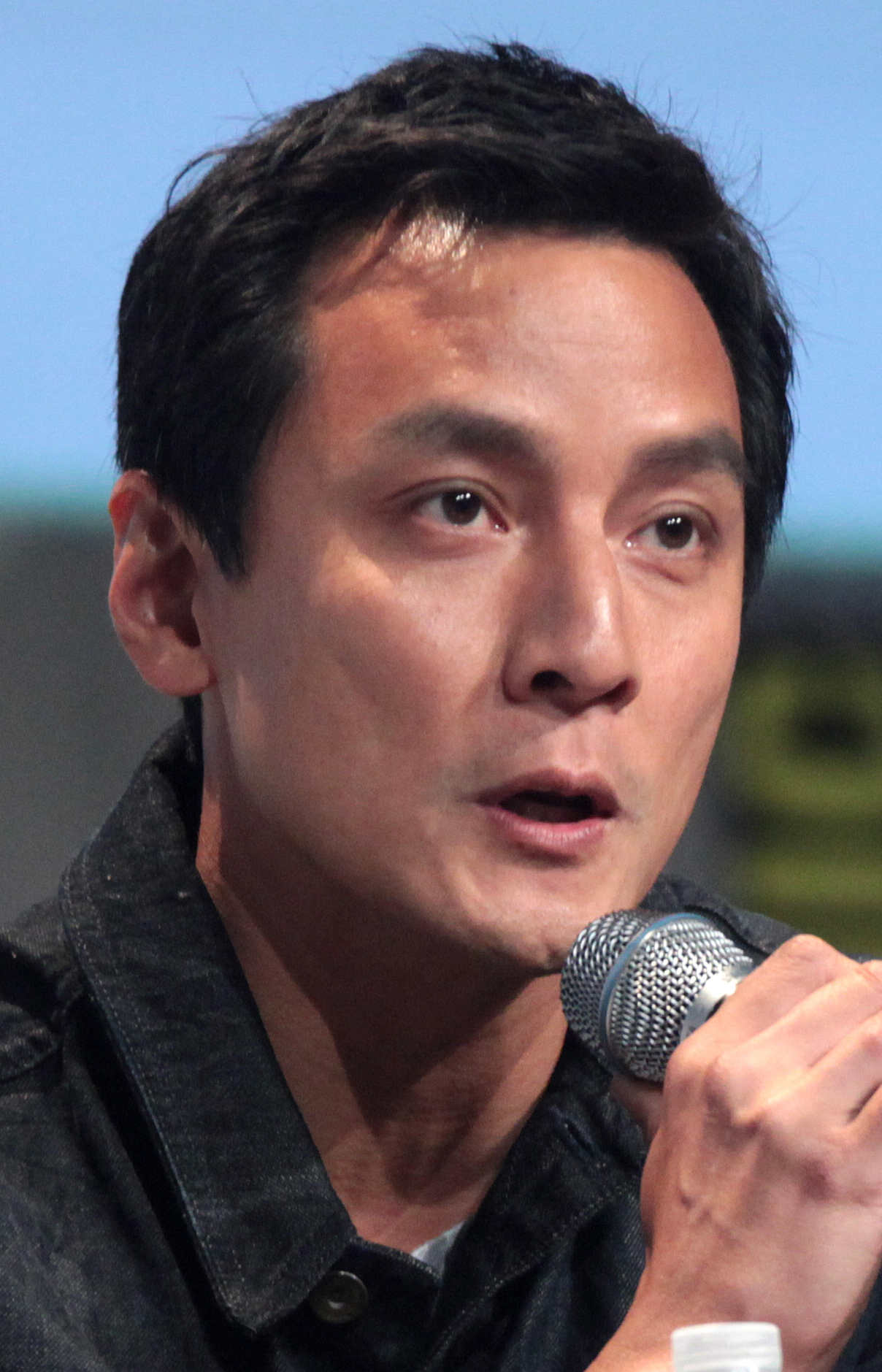
Daniel Wu

- September 1
  - Rich Burlew, author, game designer, and graphic designer
  - Burn Gorman, American-born British actor and musician
  - Jhonen Vasquez, comic book writer and cartoonist
- September 3
  - Vaughn Bean, boxer
  - Julie Berry, author
  - Jen Royle, sports reporter and chef
- September 4
  - Carmit Bachar, singer, dancer, and member of Pussycat Dolls
  - Deidre Henderson, politician, 9th Lieutenant Governor of Utah
  - Taya Kyle, author, political commentator, and widow of Chris Kyle
- September 5 – Andy Barkett, baseball player
- September 9
  - John Allred, football player
  - Jon Bokenkamp, writer and producer
  - John R. Bradford III, politician
- September 10
  - Roosevelt Blackmon, football player
  - Kerry Harvick, singer
  - Ryan Phillippe, actor
  - Ben Wallace, basketball player
- September 11
  - Ben Best, actor, writer, musician, and producer (d. 2021)
  - Dremiel Byers, wrestler
- September 12 – Jennifer Nettles, musician
- September 13 – Randall Bailey, boxer
- September 14
  - Chad Bradford, baseball player
  - Carl DeMaio, politician
- September 16
  - Joaquin Castro, politician
  - Julian Castro, politician, mayor of San Antonio, Texas (2009–2014), and U.S. Secretary of Housing and Urban Development (2014–2017)
- September 17
  - Austin St. John, actor and martial artist
  - DJ Babu, DJ, producer, and member of Dilated Peoples
  - Rasheed Wallace, basketball player
- September 18
  - Fred Beasley, football player
  - Travis Schuldt, actor
  - Xzibit, rapper
- September 19
  - Jimmy Fallon, comedian, actor, television host, singer, writer, and producer
  - Dimitrious Stanley, football player (d. 2023)
- September 20
  - Omar Amr, Olympic water polo player
  - Regina Romero, politician, mayor of Tucson, Arizona (2019–present)
- September 21
  - Crystal Aikin, gospel singer/songwriter
  - Derek Brown, entrepreneur, writer, and mixologist
  - Stanley Huang, singer and actor
- September 22
  - Jerome Adams, Surgeon General
  - S. Bear Bergman, American-born Canadian author, poet, playwright, and theater artist
  - Jenn Colella, actress and singer
  - Wayne Grayson, voice actor and director
- September 23 – Matt Hardy, wrestler
- September 24
  - Danya Abrams, basketball player
  - Karyn Bosnak, author
- September 25 – Daniel Kessler, guitarist for Interpol
- September 26
  - Josh Arieh, poker player
  - Gary Hall Jr., Olympic swimmer
  - Larry Izzo, football player and coach
- September 27
  - Carrie Brownstein, musician, actress, writer, director, and comedian
  - Brandy Burre, actress
- September 28 – Reggie Brown, football player
- September 29
  - Brian Ash, producer and screenwriter
  - Alexander Brandon, video game musician
  - Doug Brown, Canadian-born football player
- September 30
  - Melanie Bromley, British-born journalist and broadcaster
  - Eli Cottonwood, wrestler
  - Jeremy Giambi, baseball player (d. 2022)
  - Daniel Wu, actor, director, and producer

=== October ===
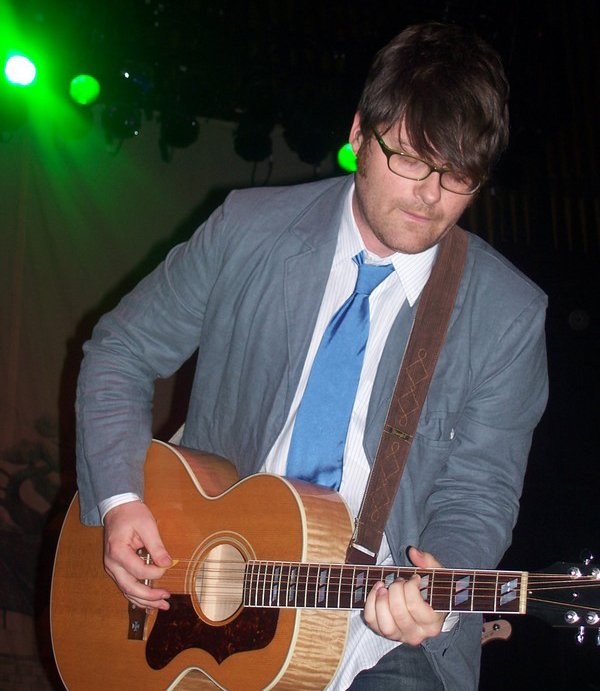
Colin Meloy

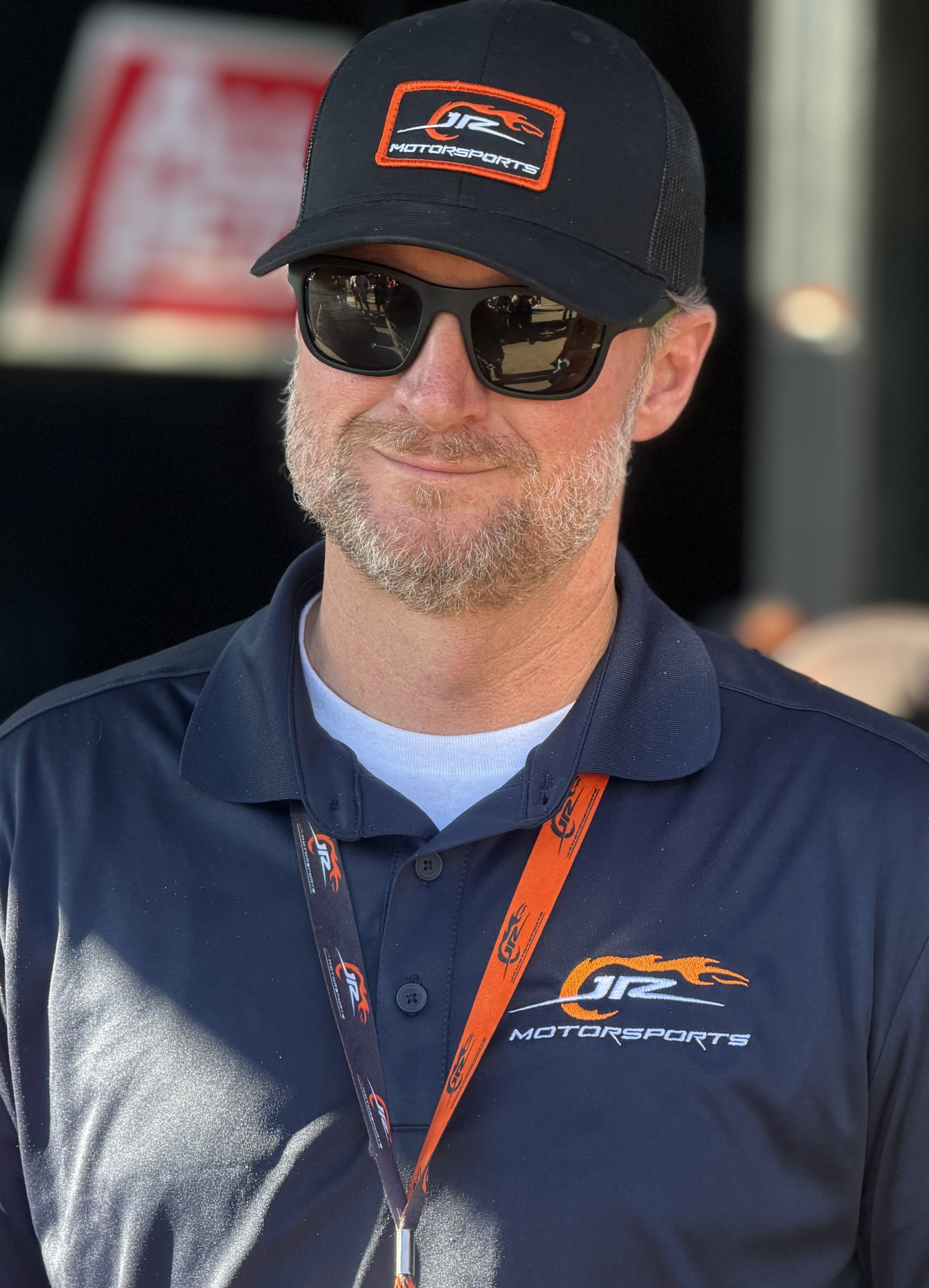
Dale Earnhardt Jr.

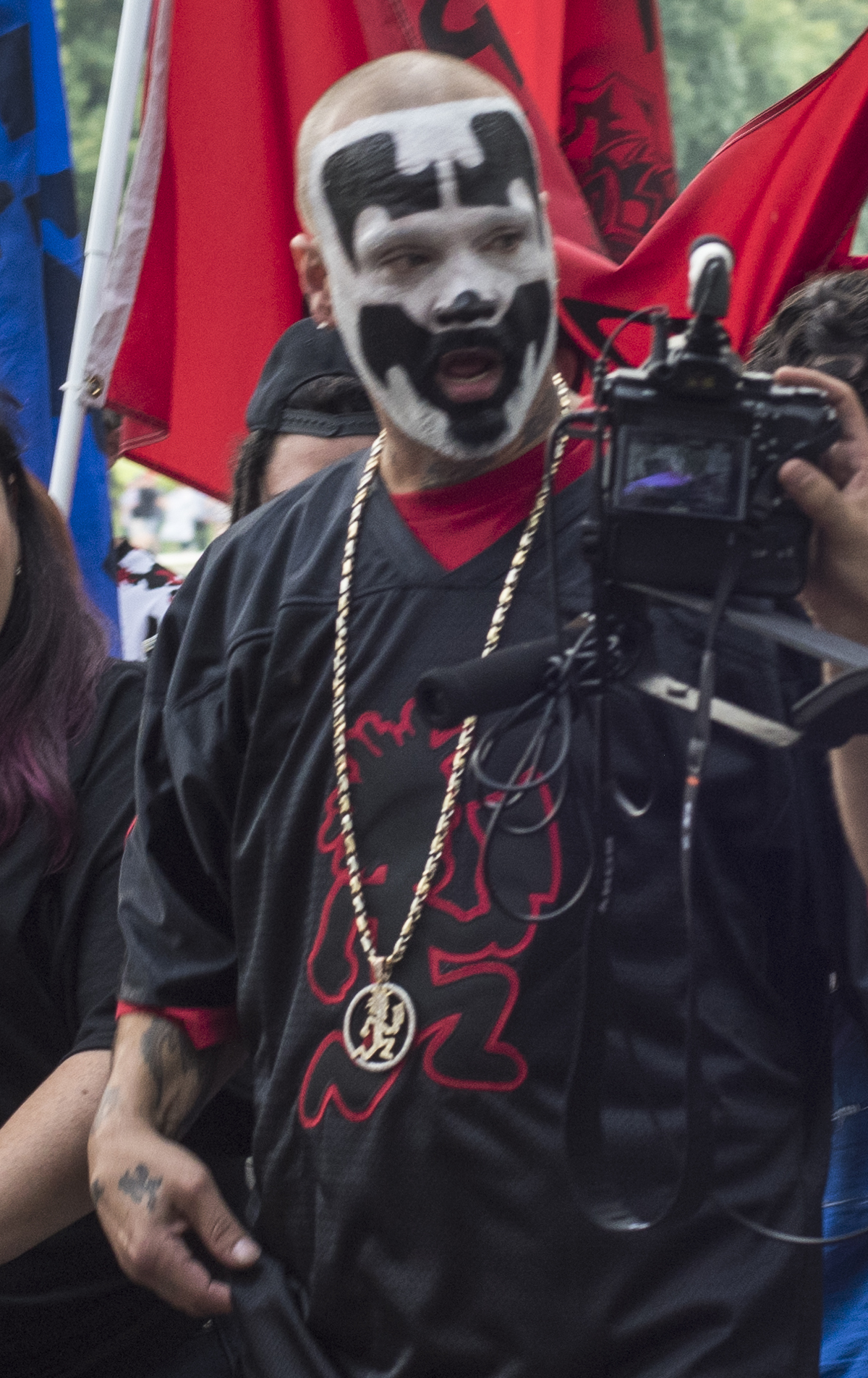
Shaggy 2 Dope

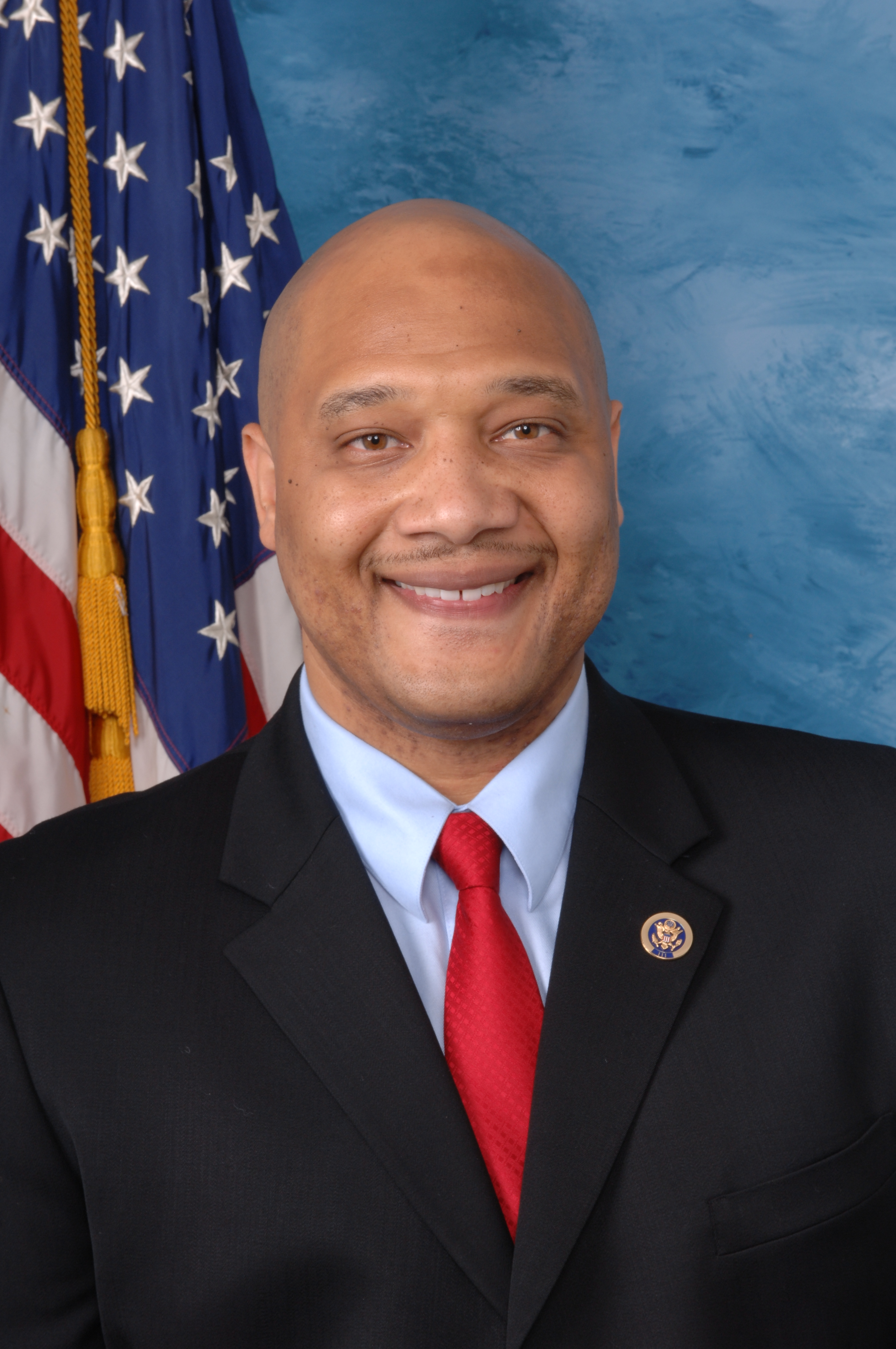
André Carson

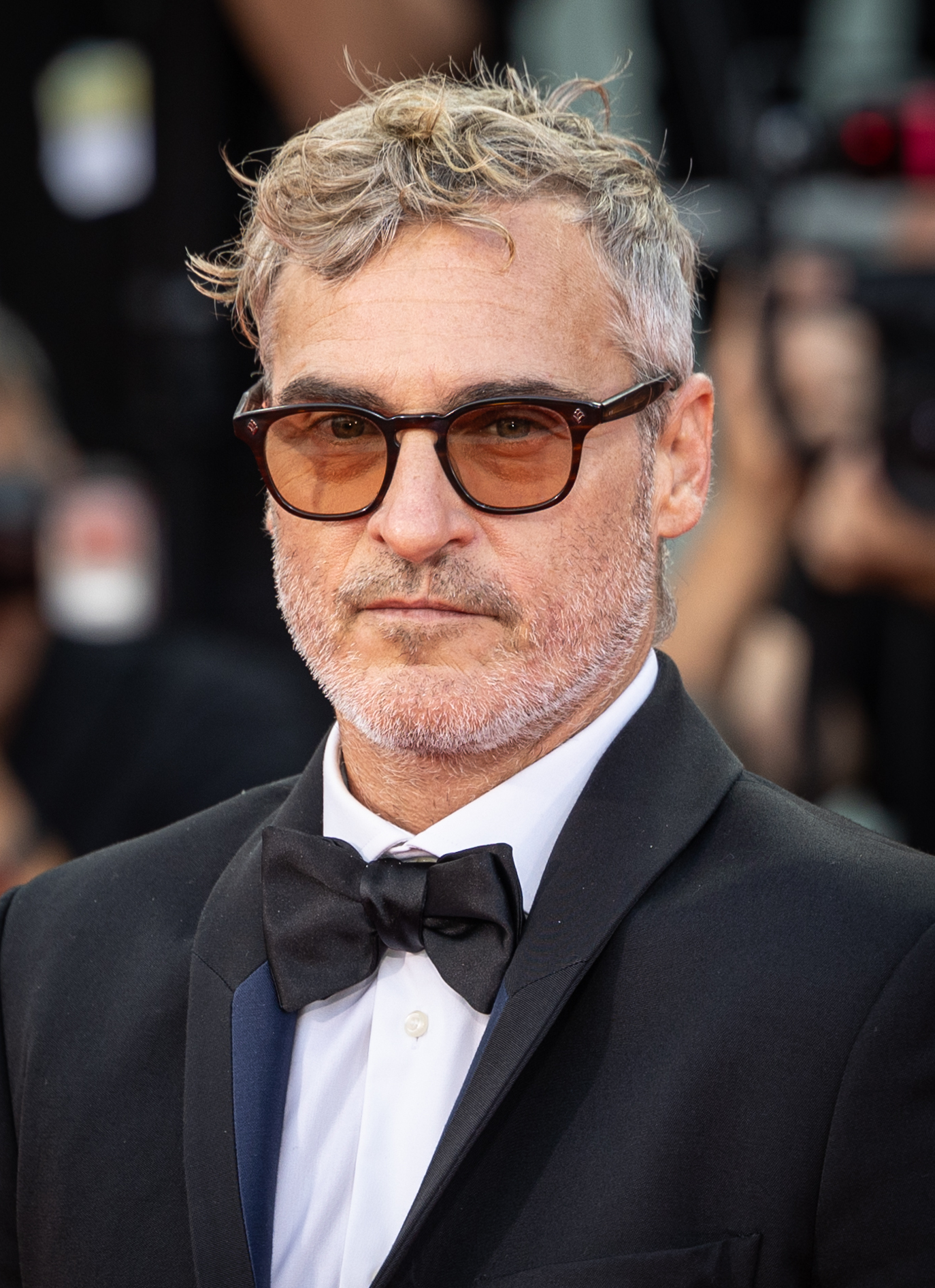
Joaquin Phoenix

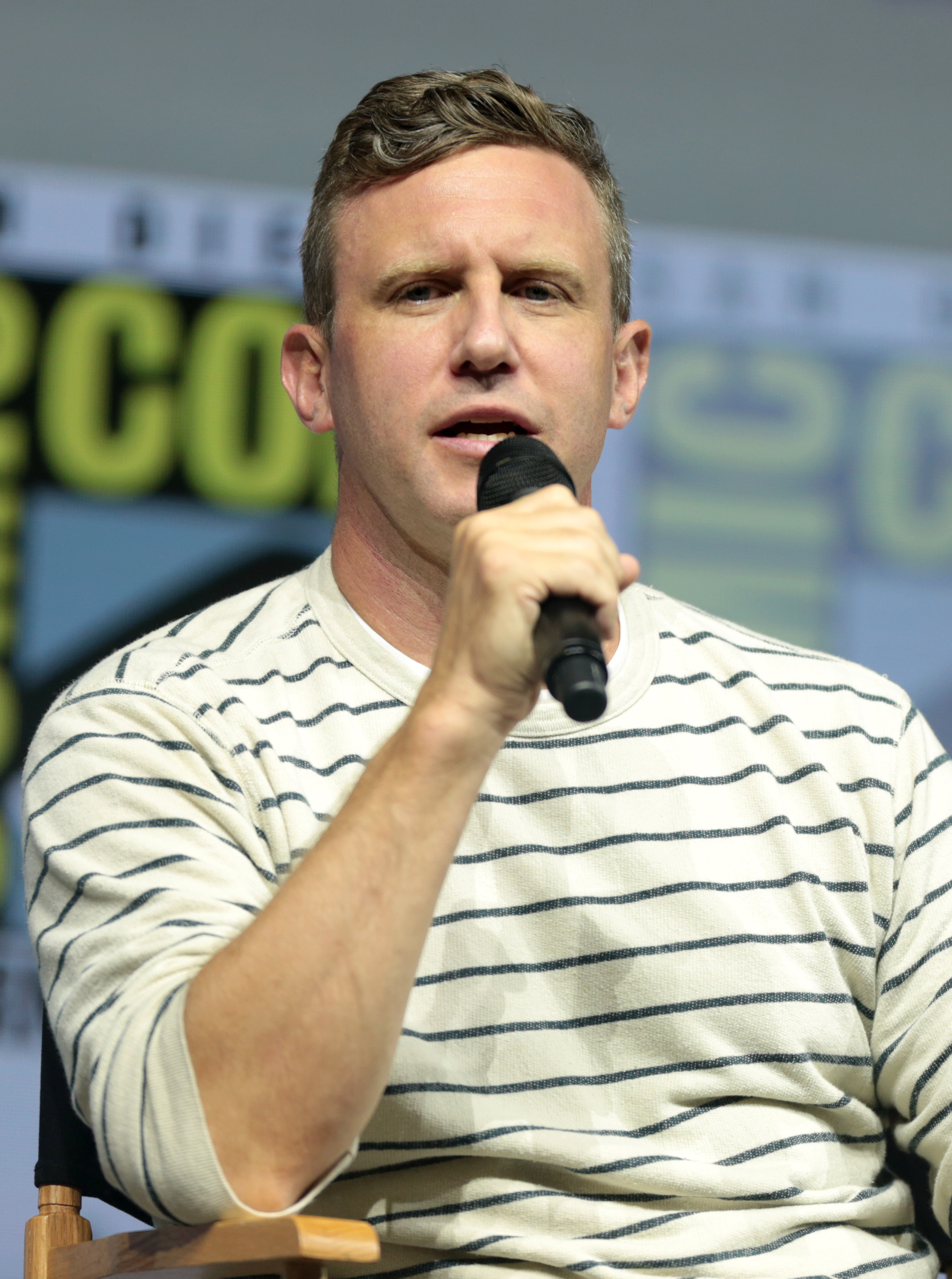
Ruben Fleischer

- October 1 – Corey Brown, politician
- October 2
  - Ricky Bell, football player (d. 2011)
  - Courtney Hansen, television personality, model, and host
- October 4 – Tom Askey, ice hockey player
- October 5
  - Jon Brunt, curler
  - Rich Franklin, mixed martial artist and actor
  - Colin Meloy, singer/songwriter, guitarist, and frontman for The Decemberists
- October 6
  - Evan R. Bernstein, Jewish community activist
  - Jim Bundren, football player
  - Jeremy Sisto, actor
- October 7
  - Shannon MacMillan, soccer player and coach
  - Allison Munn, actress
  - Alexander Polinsky, actor, voice actor, and singer
- October 8
  - Kevyn Adams, ice hockey player
  - Shelly Blake-Plock, entrepreneur and musician
- October 9
  - Keith Booth, basketball player and coach
  - Tom Perriello, politician
- October 10
  - Cara Butler, stepdancer and choreographer
  - Dale Earnhardt Jr., race car driver
- October 11
  - Kimberly Clarice Aiken, Miss America 1994
  - Baba Ali, Iranian-born comedian, games developer, businessman, and actor
  - Kane Kosugi, actor and martial artist
  - Greg Poehler, actor
- October 12
  - Nur Ali, Pakistani-born race car driver
  - Shane McAnally, country singer/songwriter and record producer
- October 13 – Terron Brooks, singer/songwriter and actor
- October 14
  - Sheila Bleck, bodybuilder
  - Stacy Boyle, rugby player
  - Jessica Drake, porn actress
  - Dana Glover, singer and songwriter
  - Natalie Maines, country singer and vocalist for The Chicks
  - Shaggy 2 Dope, rapper, record producer, DJ, podcast host, wrestler, and member of Insane Clown Posse
- October 16
  - Katherine Jane Bryant, costume designer
  - André Carson, politician
- October 18 – Jeremy Scahill, journalist
- October 20
  - Tyrone Bell, football player
  - Lauren McLean, politician, mayor of Boise, Idaho (2019–present)
  - Bashar Rahal, actor
- October 21 – Nakia Burrise, actress
- October 24 – Will Brice, football player
- October 25 – Shonn Bell, football player
- October 27 – Pooja Batra, Indian-born actress and model
- October 28
  - Matthew Bell, politician
  - Michael Dougherty, director, screenwriter, producer, and animator
  - Joaquin Phoenix, actor
- October 29 – Eric Gales, blues rock guitarist
- October 30
  - MC Paul Barman, rapper
  - Dylan Berry, musician, record producer, radio host, and composer
- October 31 – Ruben Fleischer, director and producer

=== November ===
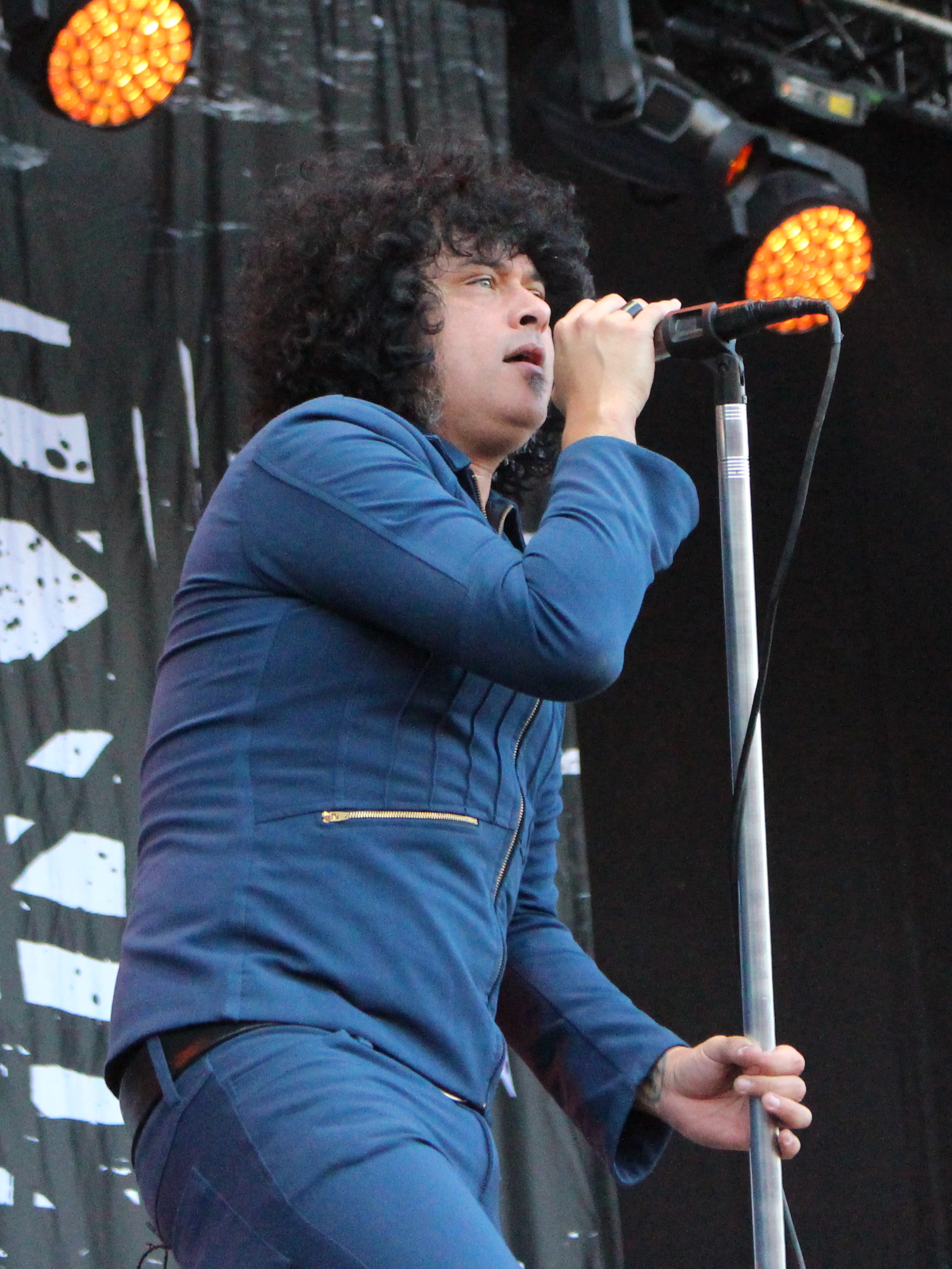
Cedric Bixler-Zavala

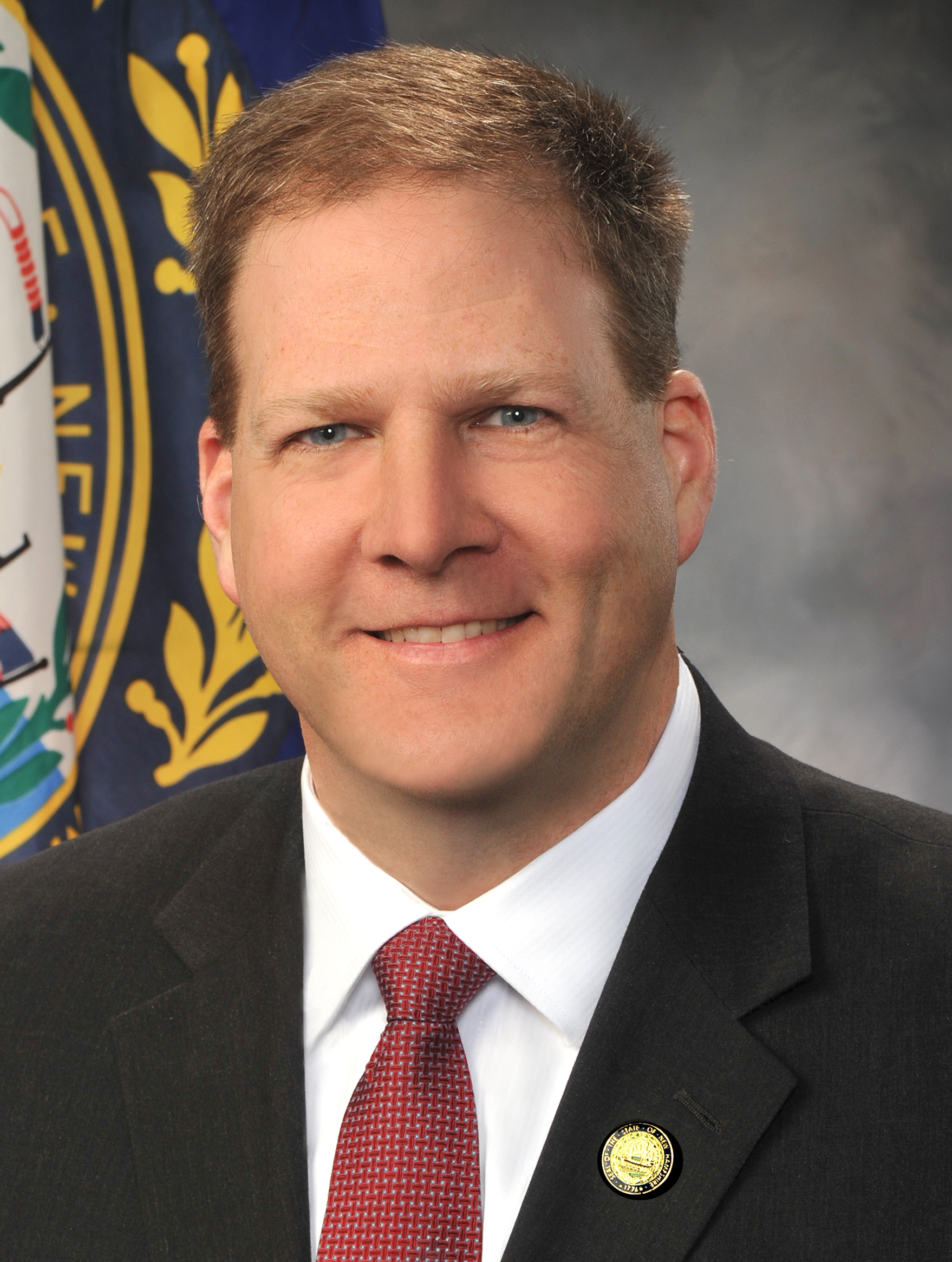
Chris Sununu

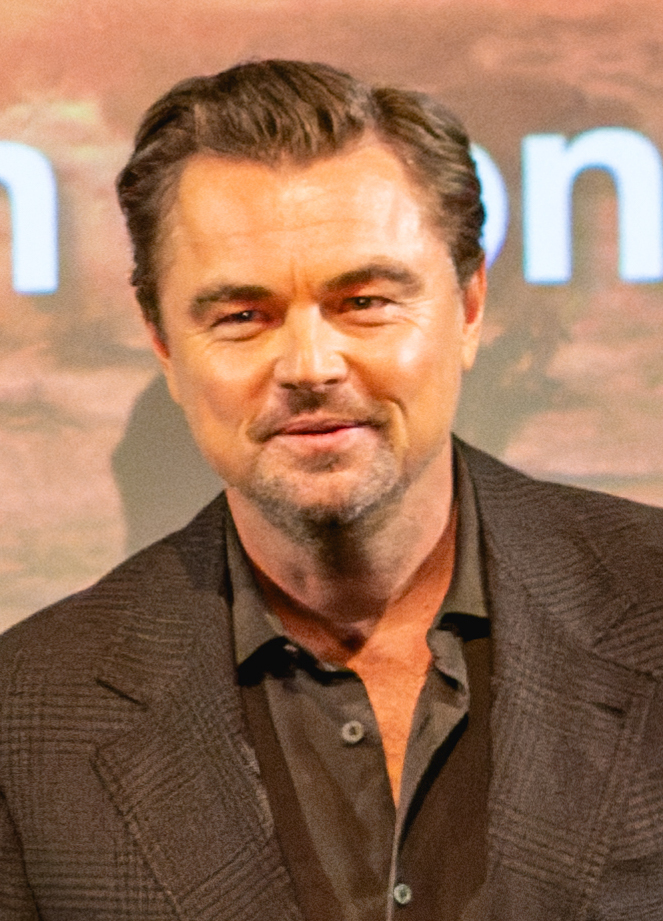
Leonardo DiCaprio

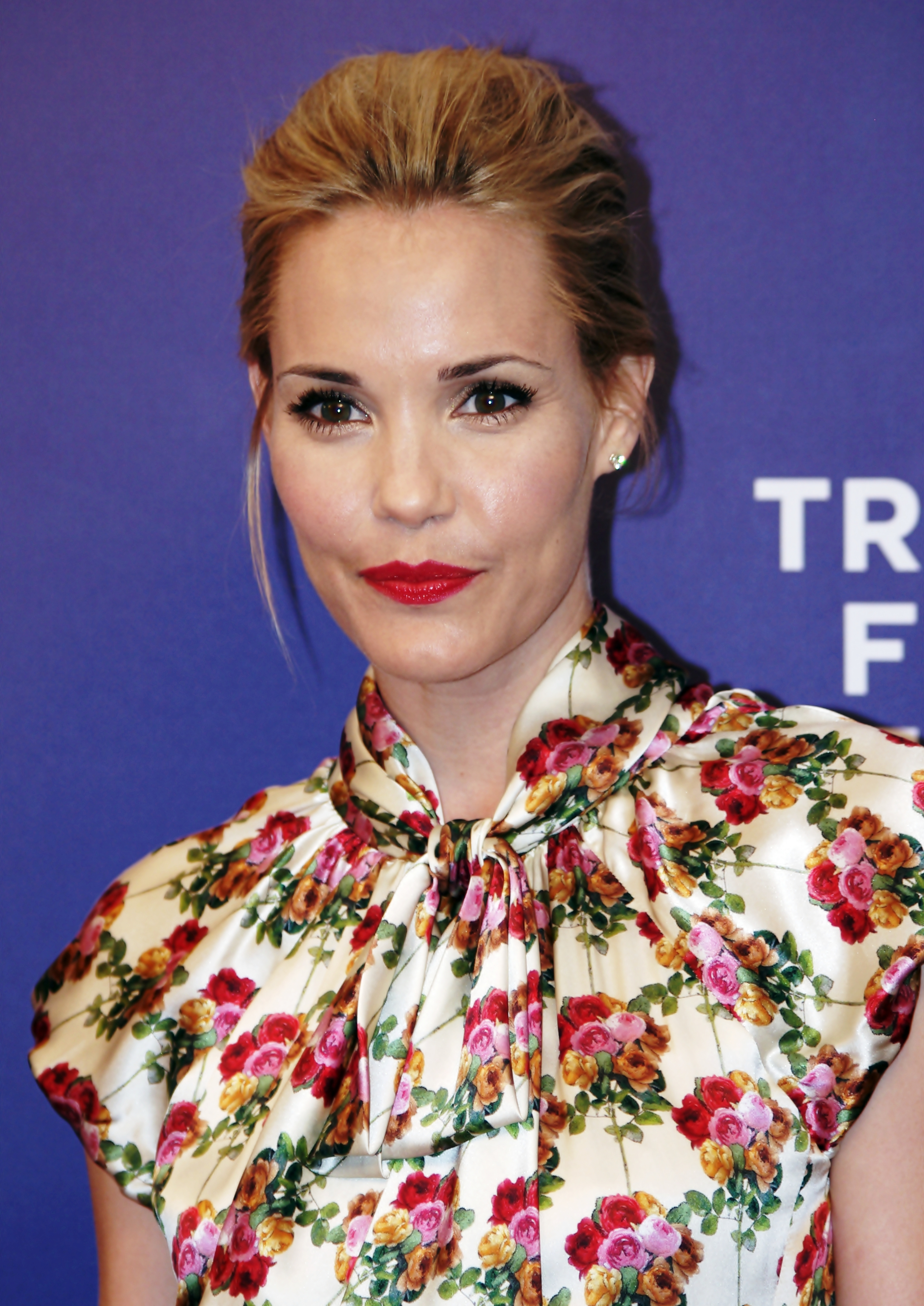
Leslie Bibb

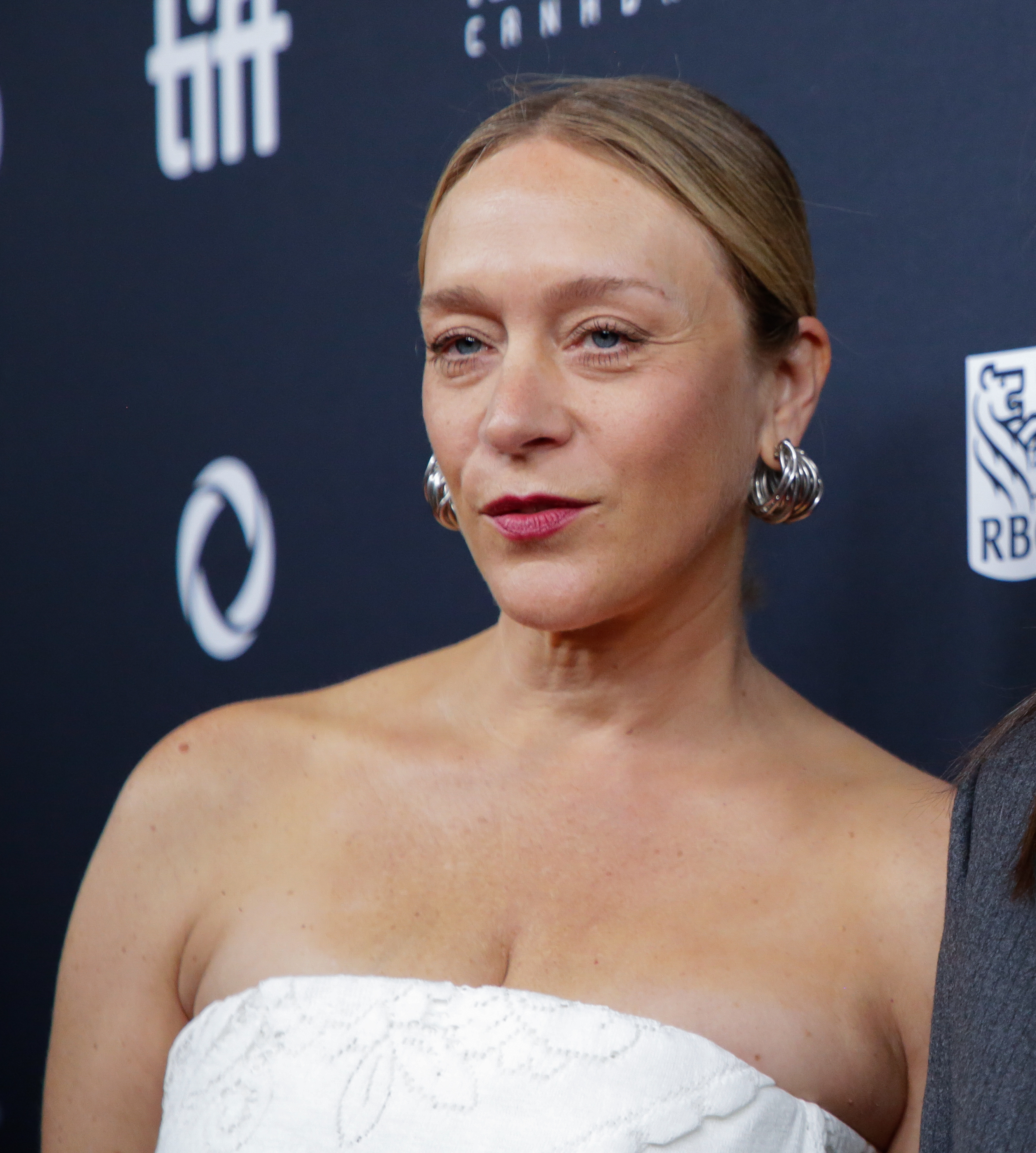
Chloë Sevigny

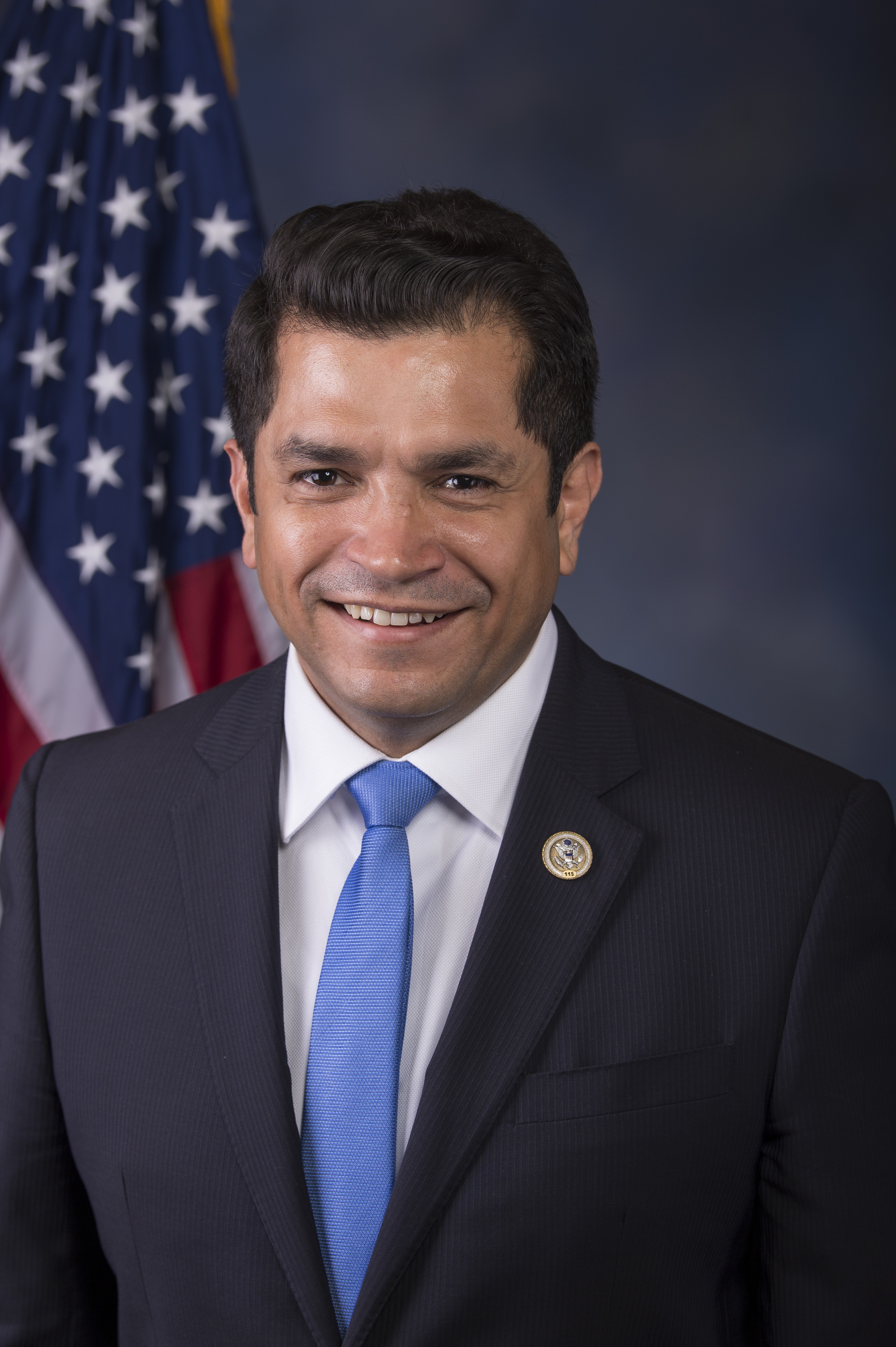
Jimmy Gomez

- November 2
  - Nelly, rapper
  - Prodigy, born Albert Johnson, rapper (d. 2017)
- November 4 – Cedric Bixler-Zavala, singer and frontman for The Mars Volta and At the Drive-In
- November 5
  - Ryan Adams, singer/songwriter
  - Wesley Bell , politician
  - Ricardo Lara, politician
  - Jerry Stackhouse, basketball player
  - Chris Sununu, politician, 82nd Governor of New Hampshire
- November 7
  - Amanda Adkins, politician
  - Kris Benson, baseball player
  - Carl Steven, child actor (d. 2011)
- November 8
  - Ada Brown, judge
  - Gregory W. Brown, composer
- November 9
  - Richard H. Bernstein, judge
  - Joe C., rapper (d. 2000)
- November 10
  - Julie H. Becker, judge
  - Micah Bowie, baseball player
- November 11
  - Leonardo DiCaprio, actor
  - Jon B., singer/songwriter
  - Monica De La Cruz, politician
- November 12
  - Lourdes Benedicto, actress
  - Aaron Brink, mixed martial artist and pornographic actor
- November 14
  - Chip Gaines, television personality, host, and carpenter
  - David Moscow, actor and producer
  - Joe Principe, bassist for Rise Against
  - Adam Walsh, murder victim and son of John Walsh (d. 1981)
- November 15 – Fred Brock, football player
- November 16 – Isaac Byrd, football player
- November 17
  - Leslie Bibb, actress and model
  - Mike Johnston, politician, mayor of Denver, Colorado (2023–present)
- November 18
  - Rob Balachandran, rugby player
  - Tricia Byrnes, Olympic snowboarder
  - Chloë Sevigny, actress, director, model, and fashion designer
- November 19
  - Aimee Brooks, actress
  - Buckshot, rapper
  - Brad Stewart, bassist
- November 24 – Dave Aizer, television host, writer, and producer
- November 25
  - Thad Busby, football player
  - Jimmy Gomez, politician
- November 26 – Michael Blair, football player
- November 28
  - apl.de.ap, Philippine-born rapper
  - Pascal Bedrossian, French-born soccer player
  - James C. Mathis III, actor
  - Styles P, rapper
- November 29
  - Big Pokey, rapper (d. 2023)
  - Chris Brymer, football player
- November 30
  - Luther Broughton, football player
  - Naomi Pomeroy, chef and restauranteur (d. 2024)

=== December ===
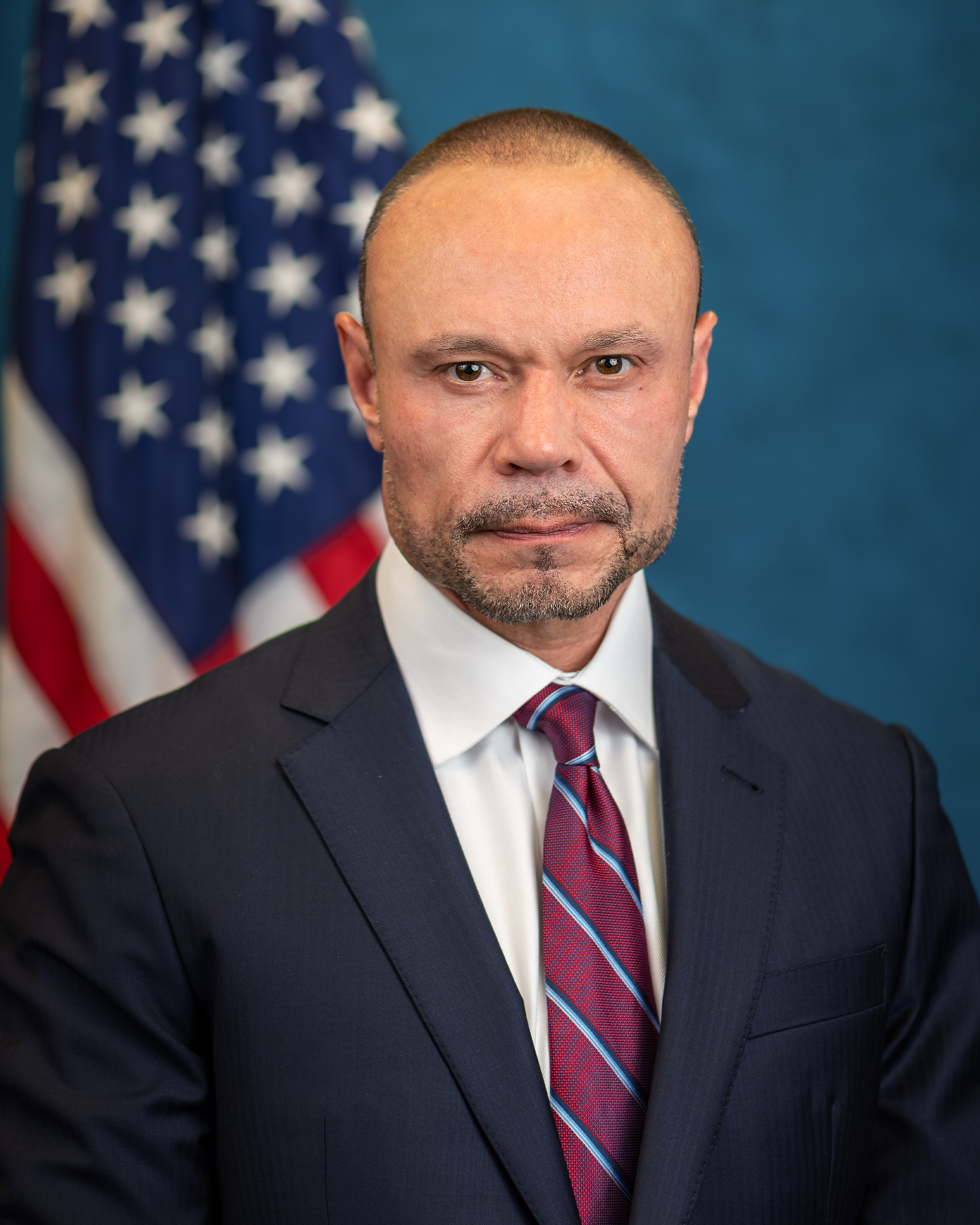
Dan Bongino

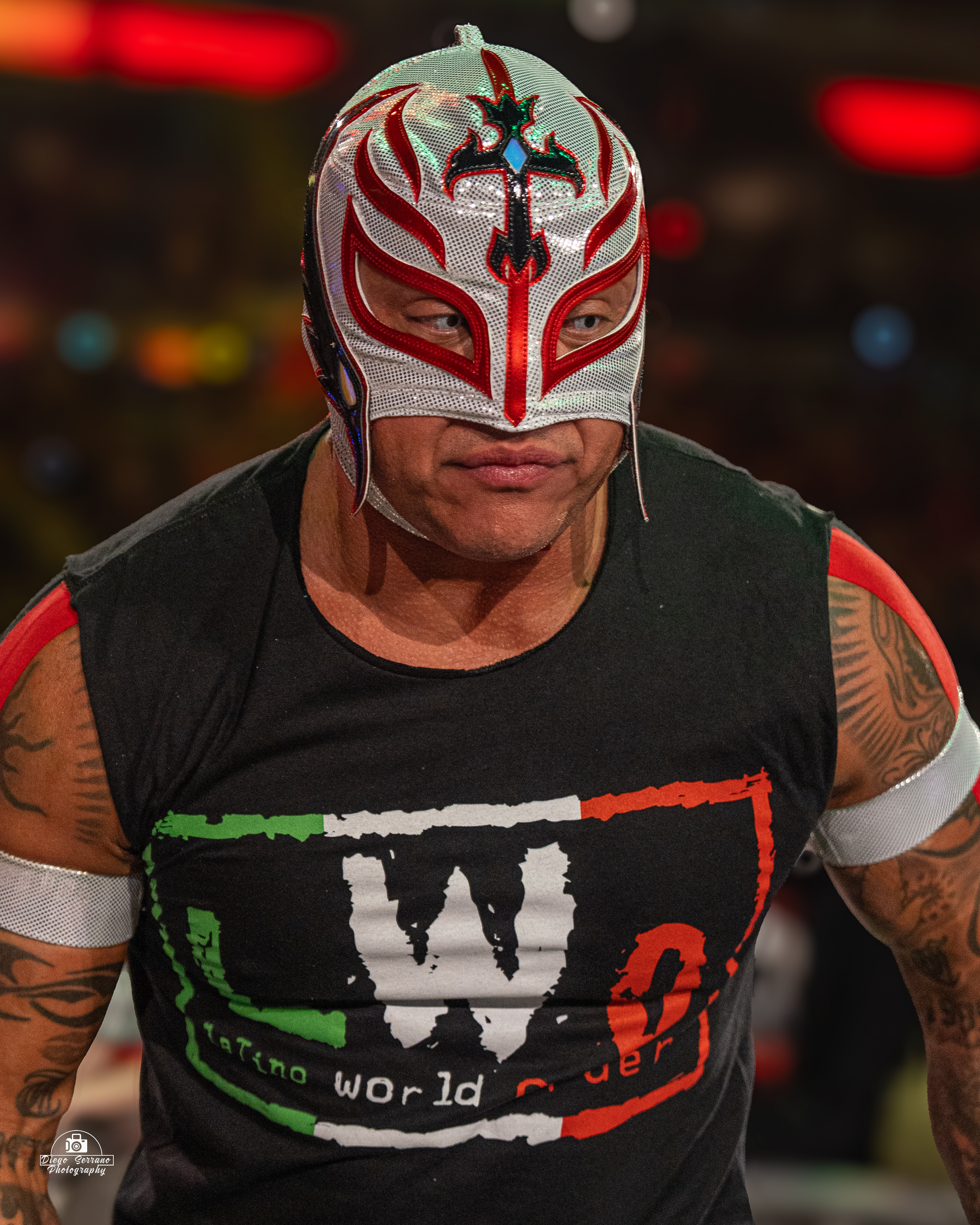
Rey Mysterio

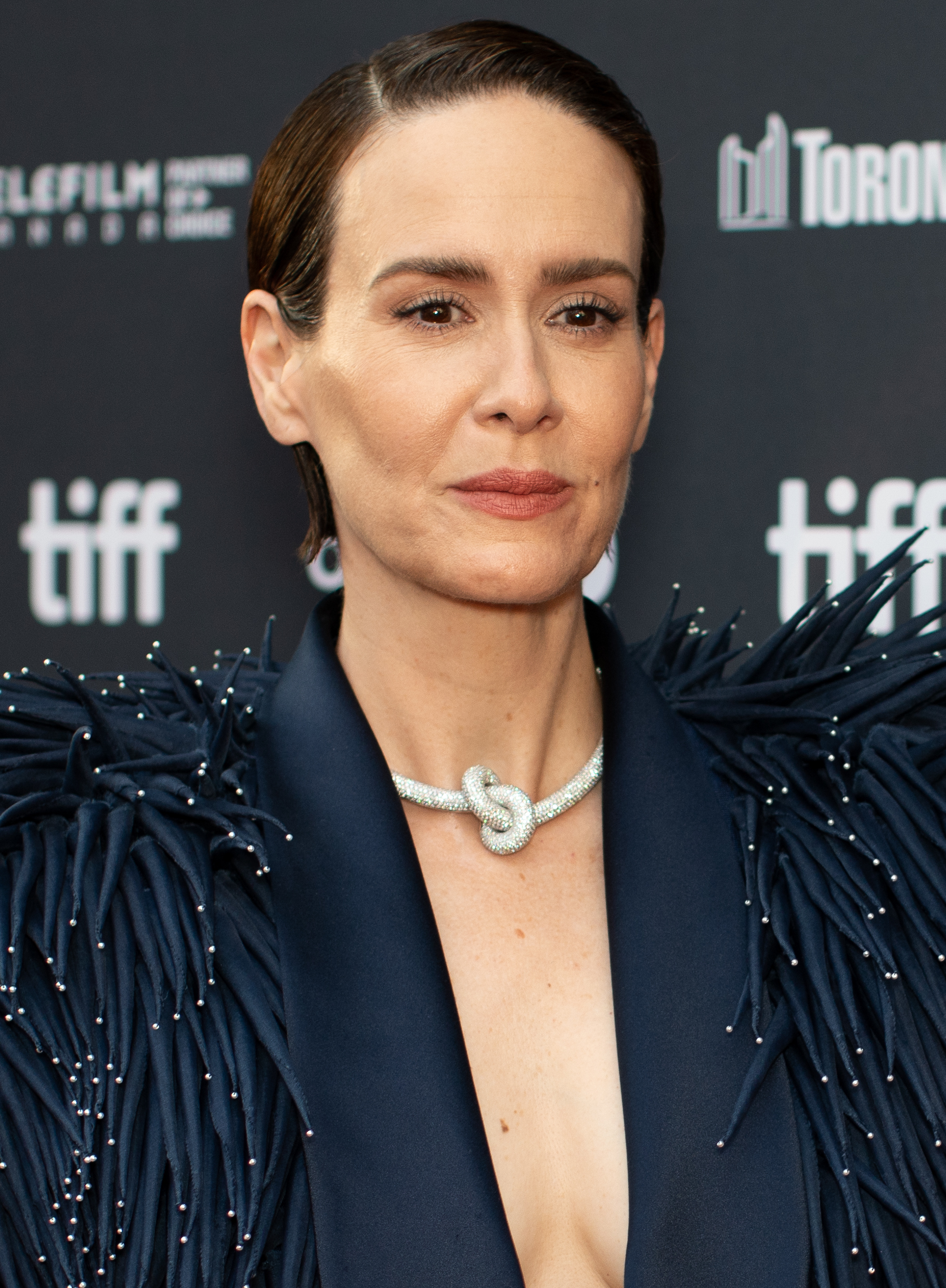
Sarah Paulson

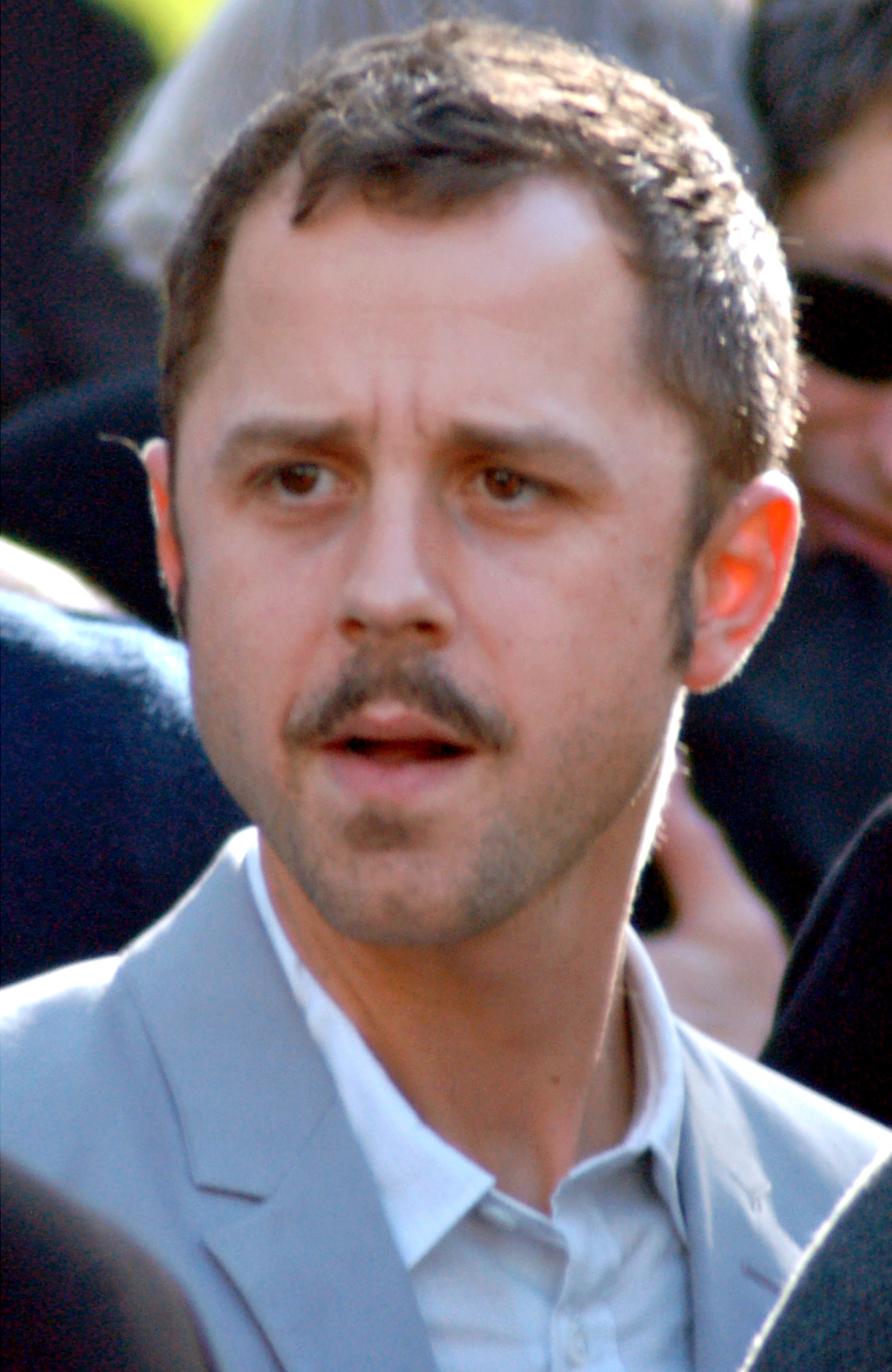
Giovanni Ribisi

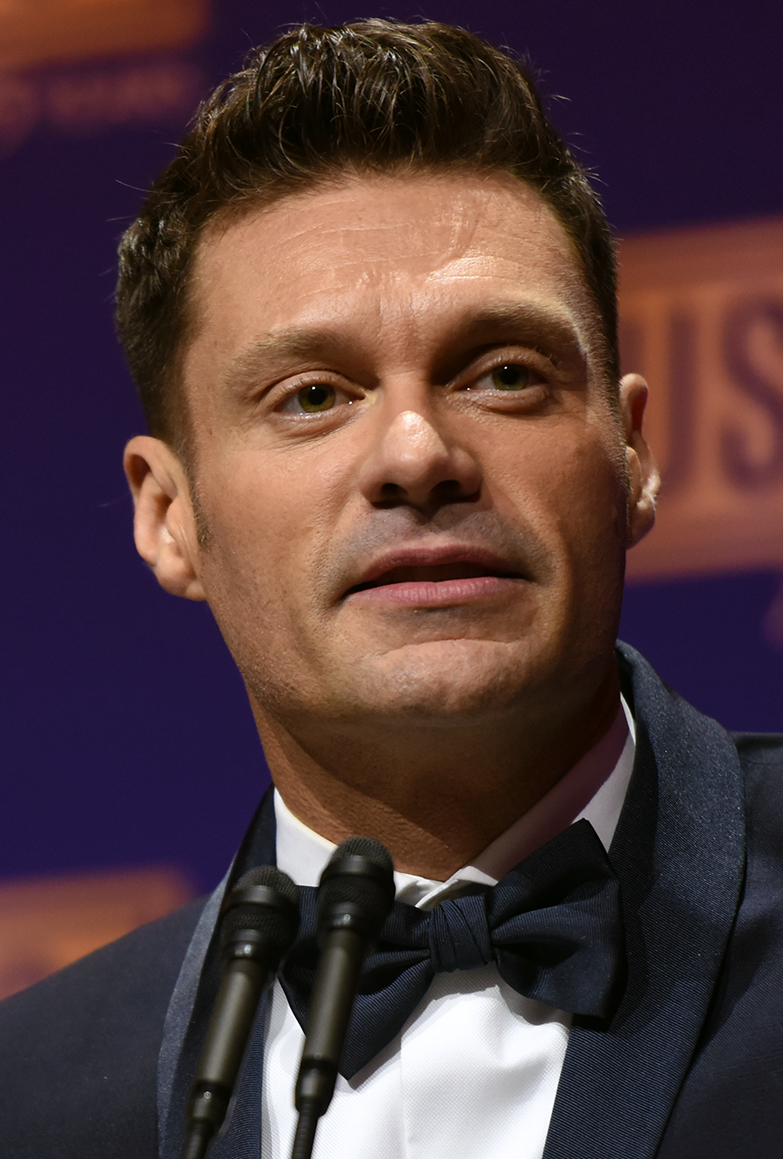
Ryan Seacrest

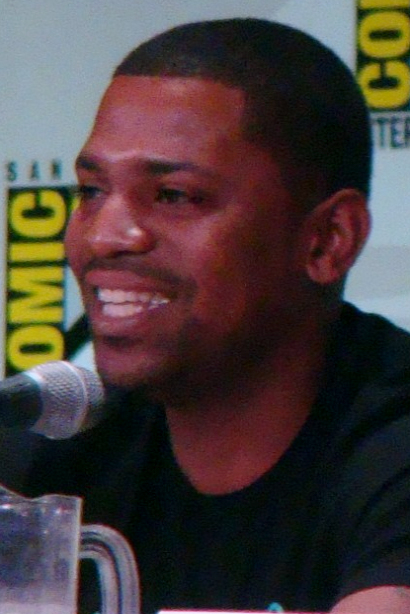
Mekhi Phifer

- December 2 – Brian Alfred, artist
- December 3 – Trina Braxton, singer and television personality
- December 4
  - Elliot Bendoly, University professor
  - Dan Bongino, political commentator, radio show host, police officer, secret service agent, author, and political candidate
- December 5
  - Charlie Batch, football player and sportscaster
  - C-Note, rapper
  - Brian Lewis, Olympic sprinter
  - Ben McAdams, politician
  - Lisa Sheridan, actress (d. 2019)
- December 7
  - Mike Bell, baseball player and coach (d. 2021)
  - Daniel Boman, politician
- December 8 – Nick Zinner, photographer and guitarist for Yeah Yeah Yeahs
- December 9
  - David Akers, football player
  - Julie Buck, filmmaker
- December 10 – Meg White, drummer for The White Stripes
- December 11
  - Joshua Becker, author, writer, and philanthropist
  - Rey Mysterio, wrestler and luchador
  - Lisa Ortiz, voice actress
- December 12 – Tawny Banh, Vietnamese-born table tennis player
- December 13
  - Ben Hoffman, comedian, actor, writer, and musician
  - Debbie Matenopoulos, Television host
- December 14 – Amplitude Problem, Swedish-born musician and producer
- December 15
  - Cory Branan, singer/songwriter
  - P. J. Byrne, actor
- December 17
  - Paul Briggs, animator and voice actor
  - Sarah Paulson, actress
  - Giovanni Ribisi, actor
- December 18
  - Peter Boulware, football player
  - Kari Byron, artist and television personality
- December 20
  - Gran Akuma, wrestler
  - Samantha Buck, filmmaker
- December 21 – Ray Austin, football player
- December 24 – Ryan Seacrest, television personality
- December 25
  - Kerlin Blaise, football player
  - Patrick Brennan, actor
- December 26
  - Teron Beal, singer/songwriter
  - Zach Blair, guitarist for Rise Against
  - Tony Brackens, football player
  - Tiffany Brissette, actress
  - Derrick Bryant, basketball player
- December 27 – Nate Bland, baseball player
- December 28
  - Jared Anderson, bassist for Morbid Angel (2001–2002) and Hate Eternal (1998–2003) (d. 2006)
  - Jocelyn Enriquez, singer
- December 29
  - Asheru, rapper and educator
  - Graciela Beltrán, singer
  - Emil Brown, baseball player
  - Mekhi Phifer, actor
- December 30 – Chris Bordano, football player
- December 31 – Indo G, rapper

=== Full date unknown ===
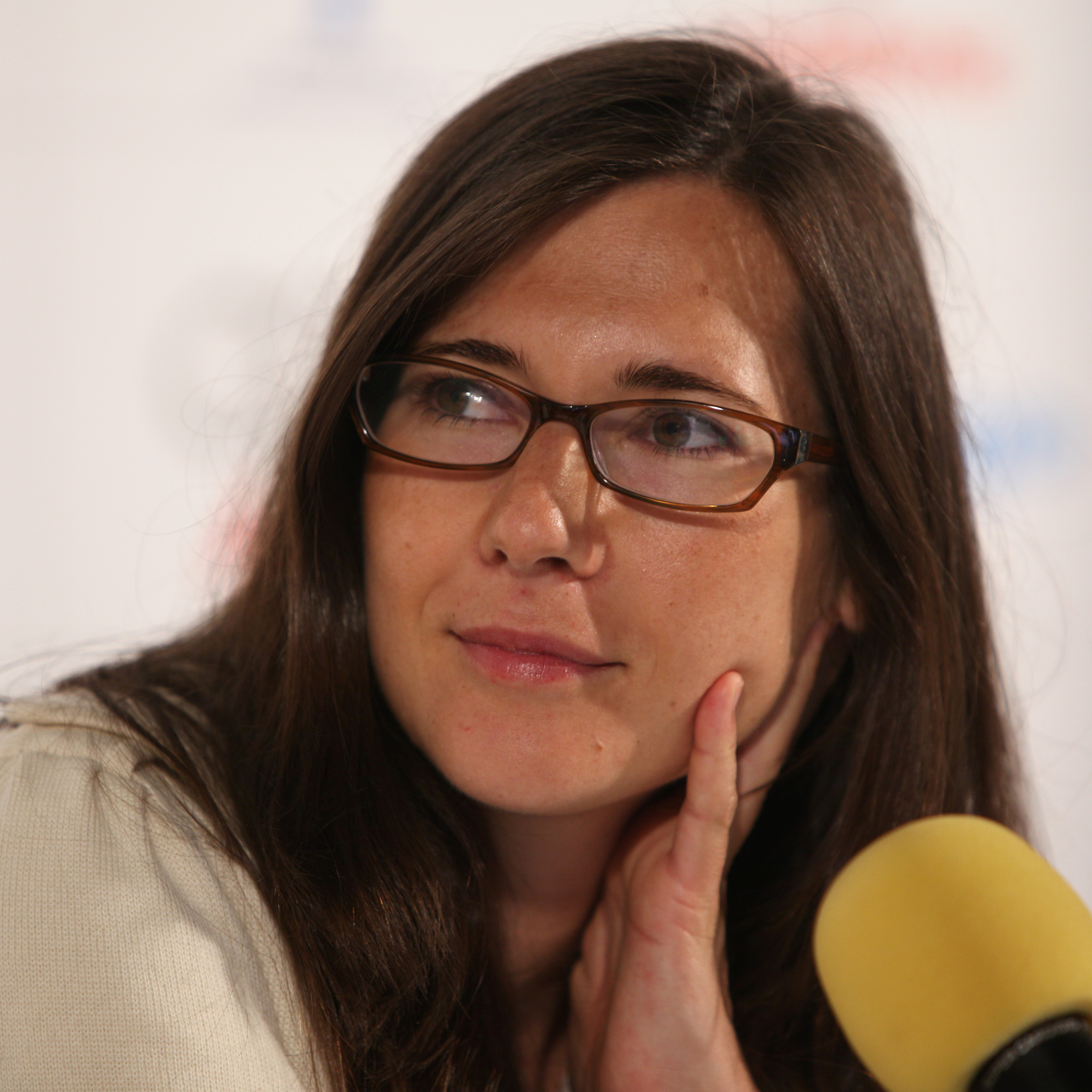
Sophie Barthes

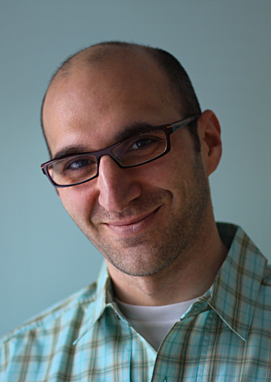
Aaron Becker

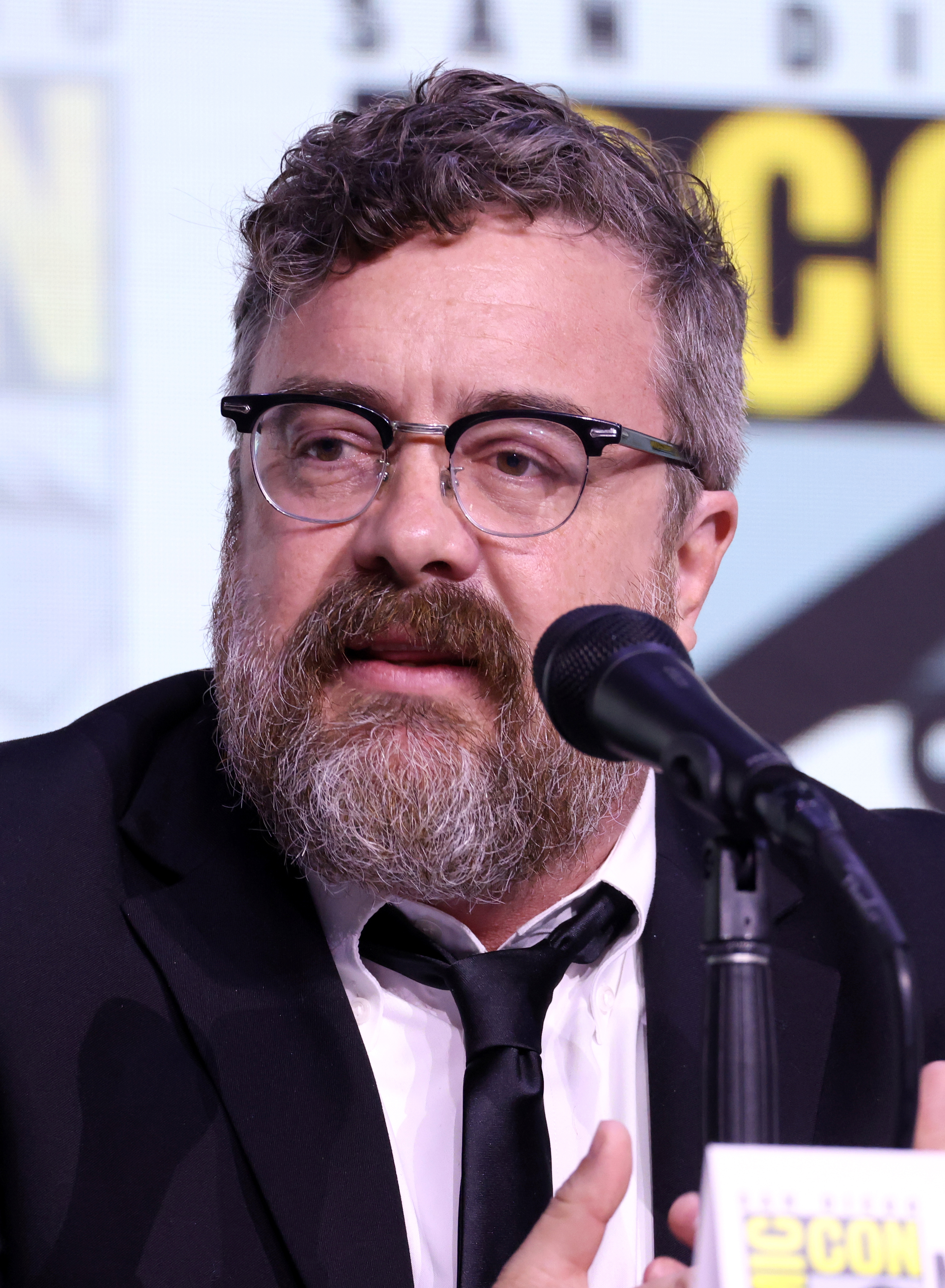
Macon Blair

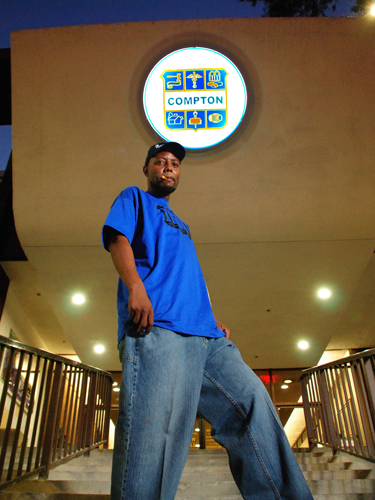
Boom Bam

- Joe Abraham, comic book illustrator and actor
- Nancy Abudu, judge
- Craig Ackerman, NBA announcer
- Rana X. Adhikari, experimental physicist
- Gaelle Adisson, singer/songwriter and producer
- Waris Ahluwalia, Indian-born actor and designer
- Jaafar Aksikas, Moroccan-born academic, activist, media personality, and cultural critic
- Suzanne Alaywan, poet and painter
- Daniel P. Aldrich, academic and professor
- Anida Yoeu Ali, Cambodian-born artist
- Tremayne Allen, football player
- Marla Alupoaicei, Christian author and speaker
- Afruz Amighi, Iranian-born sculptor and installation artist
- David Amodio, scientist
- Eric C. Anderson, entrepreneur and aerospace engineer
- John D. Arnold, philanthropist
- Tre Arrow, eco-terrorist
- James Arthur, American-born Canadian poet
- Sigal Avin, American-born Israeli writer and director
- Mya Baker, filmmaker, poet, writer, director, and researcher
- Sarah Baker, actress
- Liz Bangerter, politician
- Boaz Barak, Israeli-born computer science professor
- Erek Barron, politician
- Sophie Barthes, French-born director and screenwriter
- Gina Beavers, Greek-born artist
- Aaron Becker, writer and illustrator
- Christopher Bell, disability studies scholar (d. 2009)
- Jennifer Bendery, journalist
- Jenica Bergere, actress
- LaKiesha Berri, R&B singer
- Sharif Bey, artist
- Michael Biber, technologist and industrialist
- Cass Bird, artist, photographer, and director
- Constantin Bisanz, Austrian-born entrepreneur, investor, and extreme sports enthusiast
- Janel Bishop, beauty queen, Miss Teen USA 1991
- Scott Blader, politician
- Macon Blair, actor, screenwriter, director, producer, and comic book writer
- Chris Blattman, Canadian-born political scientist
- Yaba Blay, Ghanaian-born professor, scholar-activist, public speaker, cultural worker, and consultant
- BluRum13, rapper, emcee, actor, and producer
- Deborah Boardman, judge
- Boom Bam, rapper and member of Compton's Most Wanted and N.O.T.R.
- Cornelius Boots, composer and multi-instrumentalist
- Daniel Borzutzky, poet and translator
- David Boulware, professor and physician
- Jason Boyarski, entertainment attorney
- Adam Bradley, literary critic, professor, and writer
- Paige Bradley, sculptor
- M.C. Brains, rapper
- Bridget Breiner, American-born German ballerina
- Bridget M. Brennan, judge
- Judson A. Brewer, psychiatrist, neuroscientist, and author
- Melissa Brown, artist
- Tracy Brown, author (d. 2023)
- Ashley Buchanan, business executive for The Michaels Companies
- Julie Buffalohead, artist
- Jack Donovan, writer and activist

== Deaths ==
- January 1 – Jimmy Smith, Major League Baseball player (b. 1895)
- January 2 – Tex Ritter, actor and country musician (b. 1905)
- January 3 – Red Snapp, baseball player
- January 4 – Charles Johnes Moore, a Rear Admiral of the United States Navy (b. 1889)
- January 6 – Dewey Mayhew, American football coach (b. 1898)
- January 10 – Charles G. Bond, U.S. House of Representatives from New York (b. 1877)
- January 12 – Jack Jacobs, American-born National Football League and Canadian Football League player (b. 1919)
- January 15 – Harold D. Cooley, U.S. House of Representatives from North Carolina (b. 1897)
- January 17 – Clara Edwards, singer, pianist and composer (b. 1880)
- January 18 – Bill Finger, comic strip and book writer (b. 1914)
- January 20 – Leonard Freeman, television writer and producer (b. 1920)
- January 31 – Samuel Goldwyn, Polish-American film producer (b. 1882)
- February 4 – Stuart Buchanan, actor, casting director, producer and educator (b. 1894)
- February 8 – Fern Andra, actress (b. 1893)
- February 15 – George W. Snedecor, mathematician and statistician (b. 1881)
- February 22 – Samuel Byck, attempted to hijack an airplane to assassinate President Richard Nixon (b. 1930)
- February 23 – Harry Ruby, musician, composer and writer (b. 1886)
- February 27 – Princess Nina Georgievna of Russia, elder daughter of Grand Duke George Mikhailovich and Grand Duchess Maria Georgievna of Russia who spent her life in exile (b. 1901)
- March 5 – Billy De Wolfe, actor (b. 1905)
- March 19
  - Anne Klein, fashion designer (b. 1923)
  - Edward Platt, actor (b. 1916)
- March 20 – Chet Huntley, newscaster (b. 1911)
- March 28 – Dorothy Fields, librettist (b. 1904)
- April 7
  - Bobby Buntrock, actor (b. 1952)
  - Pete Wendling, composer, pianist and piano roll recording artist (b. 1888)
- April 9 – Marvin L. Kline, politician (b. 1903)
- April 14
  - Howard Pease, adventure novelist (b. 1894)
  - Michael Whalen, actor (b. 1902)
- April 17 – Frank McGee, TV journalist (b. 1921)
- April 19 – Vincent Taylor, guitarist (b. 1948)
- April 18 – Betty Compson, actress (b. 1897)
- April 23 – Cy Williams, baseball player (b. 1887)
- April 24 – Bud Abbott, comedian (b. 1895)
- April 28 – Paul Page, actor (b. 1903)
- April 30 – Agnes Moorehead, actress (b. 1900)
- May 24 – Duke Ellington, jazz pianist and bandleader (b. 1899)
- June 10 – Lewis R. Foster, film director and screenwriter b. 1898)
- June 17 – Pamela Britton, actress and singer (b. 1923)
- June 20 – Charles Wisner Barrell, writer (b. 1885)
- June 26 – Ernest Gruening, U.S. Senator from Alaska from 1959 to 1969 (b. 1887)
- June 28
  - Vannevar Bush, engineer, inventor and science administrator (b. 1890)
  - Frank Sutton, actor (b. 1923)
- June 30 – Alberta Williams King, civil rights organizer (b. 1904)
- July 9 – Earl Warren, 14th Chief Justice of the Supreme Court (b. 1891)
- July 15 – Christine Chubbuck, television news reporter (b. 1944)
- July 17 – Dizzy Dean, baseball player (b. 1910)
- July 19 – Joe Flynn, actor (b. 1924)
- July 27 – Lightnin' Slim, blues musician (b. 1913)
- July 28 – Truman Bradley, radio actor (b. 1905)
- July 29 – Cass Elliot, vocalist (b. 1941)
- August 21 – Buford Pusser, sheriff (b. 1937)
- August 26 – Charles Lindbergh, aviator (b. 1902)
- September 3 – Harry Partch, composer (b. 1901)
- September 4 – Creighton Abrams, general (b. 1914)
- September 6 – Otto Kruger, actor (b. 1885)
- September 11 – Lois Lenski, author and illustrator (b. 1893)
- September 14
  - Barbara Jo Allen, actress (born 1906)
  - Warren Hull, actor (born 1903)
- September 16 – Phog Allen, basketball and baseball player (b. 1885)
- September 21
  - Walter Brennan, film actor; 3-time Best Supporting Academy Award-winning actor (1936, 1938, and 1940) (b. 1894)
  - Jacqueline Susann, novelist and actress (b. 1918)
- September 22 – George Spahn, ranch owner (b. 1889)
- September 23 – Cliff Arquette, actor and comedian (b. 1905)
- September 25 – William Sloane, writer, died in a plane crash in Eastern Air Lines Flight 212 (b. 1906)
- September 26 – Jean Gale, vaudeville performer (b. 1912)
- September 27 – James R. Webb, screenwriter (b. 1909)
- October 1
  - Stephen Latchford, diplomat and aviation expert (b. 1883)
  - Frederick Moosbrugger, admiral (b. 1900)
- October 3 – Bessie Louise Pierce, historian (b. 1888)
- October 4
  - Robert Lee Moore, mathematician (b. 1882)
  - Anne Sexton, poet and writer (b. 1928)
- October 5 – Virgil Miller, cinematographer (b. 1886)
- October 7 – Henry J. Cadbury, biblical scholar and Quaker (b. 1883)
- October 8 – Harry Carney, jazz musician (b. 1910)
- October 9 – Theodore Foley, Roman Catholic priest and servant of God (b. 1913)
- October 13
  - Frank Hastings Griffin, engineer (b. 1886)
  - Ed Sullivan, entertainment writer and television host (b. 1901)
- October 26 – William C. Seitz, art curator and museum director (b. 1914}.
- October 31 – Chubby Johnson, actor (b. 1903)
- November 1 – Ralf Harolde, actor (b. 1899)
- November 5 – Stafford Repp, actor (b. 1918)
- November 8 – Ivory Joe Hunter, rhythm & blues singer, songwriter, and pianist (b. 1914)
- November 13 – Karen Silkwood, labor union activist and chemical technician (b. 1946)
- November 14 – Johnny Mack Brown, football star and actor (b. 1904)
- November 21 – John B. Gambling, radio talk-show host (b. 1897)
- November 29 – James J. Braddock, boxer (b. 1905)
- December 18 – Harry Hooper, baseball player (Boston Red Sox) (b. 1887)
- December 21 – Richard Long, television actor (b. 1927)
- December 26
  - Jack Benny, comic performer (b. 1894)
  - Frank Hussey, Olympic sprinter (b. 1905)
- December 27 – Bob Custer, film actor (b. 1898)
- December 29 – Robert Ellis, film actor (b. 1892)

== See also ==
- List of American films of 1974
- Timeline of United States history (1970–1989)
- 1974 in Michigan
