= 105th United States Congress =

1997–1999 U.S. legislative term

←	104th	106th	→
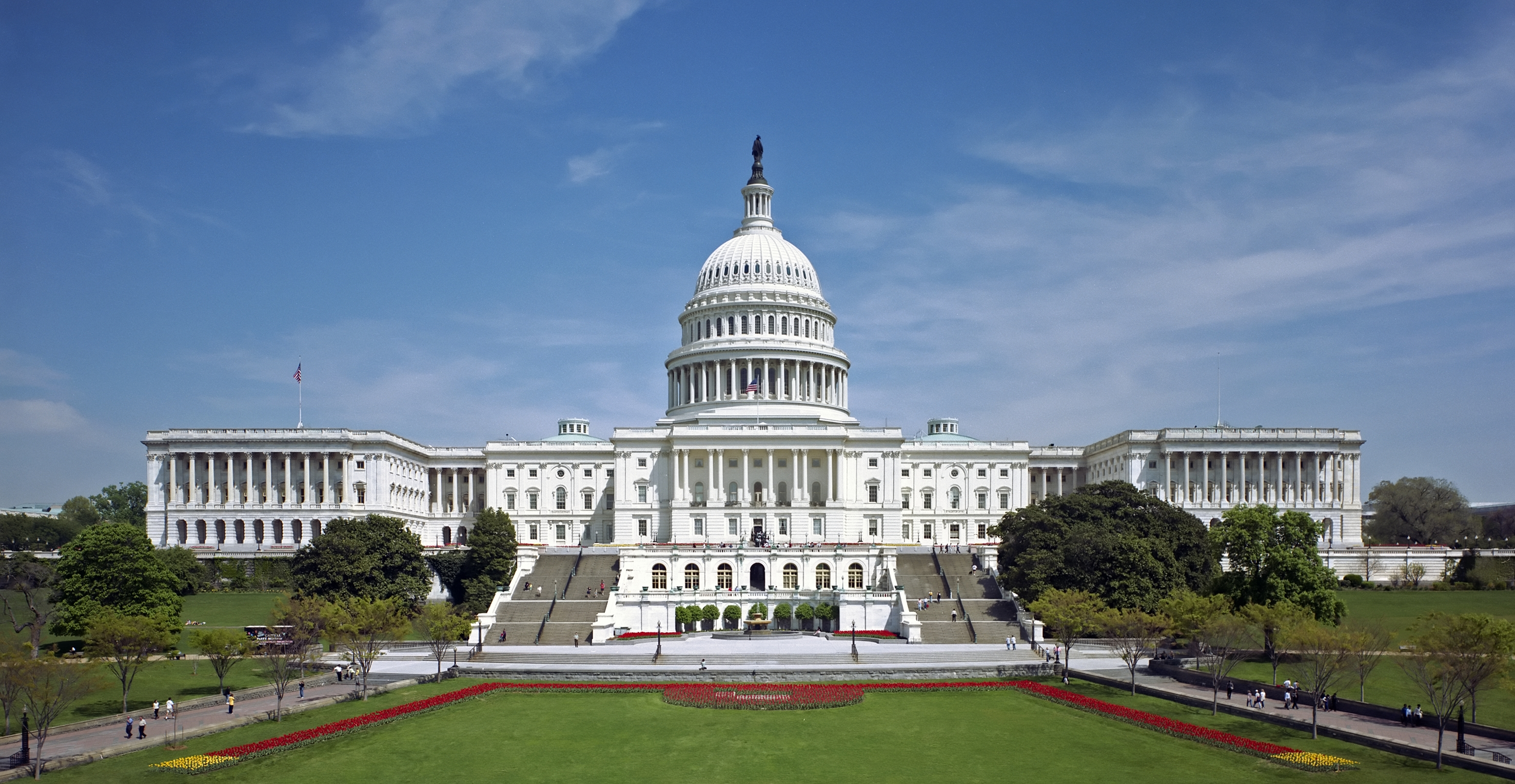
- United States Capitol (1997)

Overview
- Legislative body: United States Congress
- Jurisdiction: United States
- Term: January 3, 1997 – January 3, 1999

Senate
- Members: 100
- President: Al Gore (D)
- President pro tempore: Strom Thurmond (R)
- Party control: Republican

House of Representatives
- Members: 435 representatives 5 non-voting delegates
- Speaker: Newt Gingrich (R)
- Party control: Republican

Sessions
- 1st: January 7, 1997 – November 13, 1997
- 2nd: January 27, 1998 – December 19, 1998

The 105th United States Congress was a meeting of the legislative branch of the United States federal government, composed of the United States Senate and the United States House of Representatives. It met in Washington, DC from January 3, 1997, to January 3, 1999, during the fifth and sixth years of Bill Clinton's presidency. Apportionment of seats in the House of Representatives was based on the 1990 United States census.

This is the most recent Congress with a Republican senator from New York, Al D'Amato, who lost re-election in 1998, and a Democratic senator from Kentucky, Wendell Ford, who retired at the end of the Congress.

Both chambers retained a Republican majority. President Clinton was impeached by the US House of Representatives of the 105th Congress.

== Major events ==
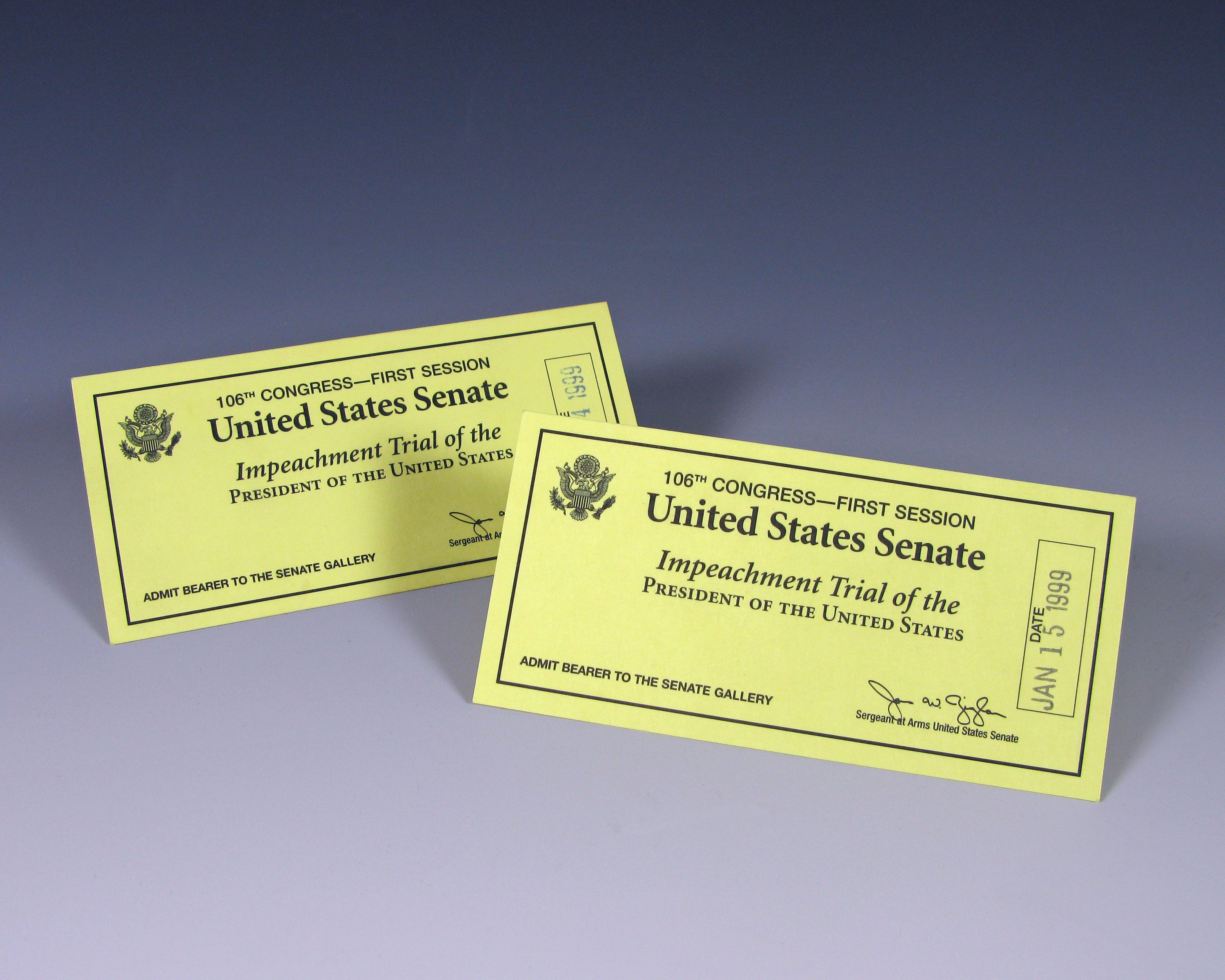
Tickets dated January 14 and 15, 1999, for President Bill Clinton's impeachment trial

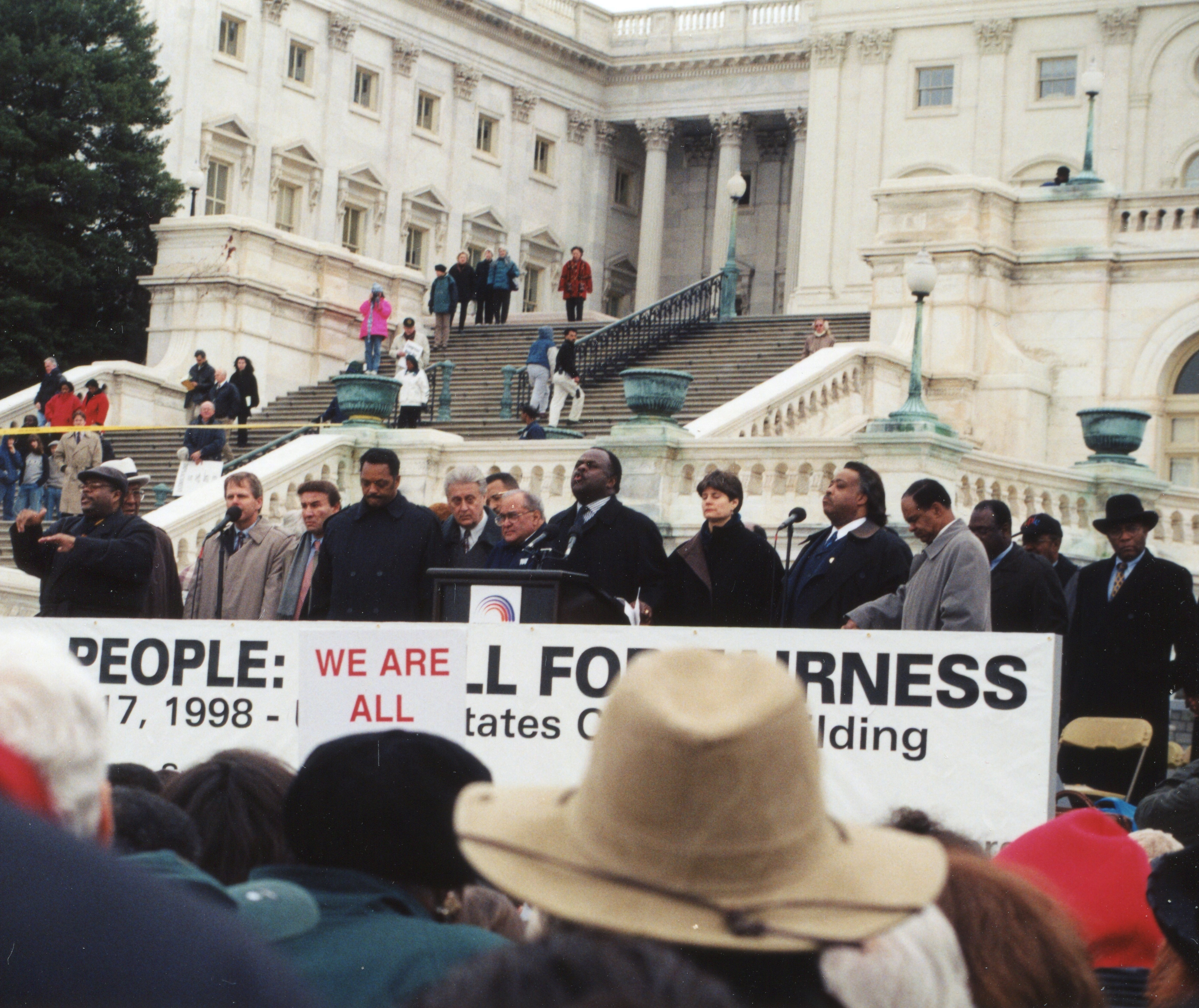
Opponents of Clinton's impeachment demonstrating outside the Capitol in December 1998

- January 20, 1997: President Bill Clinton began his second term
- May 18, 1998: United States v. Microsoft decision
- August 7, 1998: 1998 United States embassy bombings
- October 8, 1998: Impeachment of Bill Clinton: House opened an impeachment inquiry against Bill Clinton after Clinton denied that he engaged in a sexual relationship with Monica Lewinsky in a sexual harassment lawsuit filed by Paula Jones.
- December 15, 1998: Impeachment of Bill Clinton: House Judiciary Committee approved all four articles of impeachment against Clinton.
- December 19, 1998: Impeachment of Bill Clinton: House impeached President Clinton.

== Major legislation ==
- June 18, 1997: Volunteer Protection Act of 1997
- August 5, 1997: Balanced Budget Act of 1997
- August 5, 1997: Taxpayer Relief Act of 1997
- November 19, 1997; Adoption and Safe Families Act
- November 21, 1997 Food and Drug Administration Modernization Act of 1997
- December 16, 1997: No Electronic Theft (NET) Act of 1997
- June 9, 1998: Transportation Equity Act for the 21st Century
- June 23, 1998: Agricultural Research, Extension, and Educational Reform Act of 1998
- July 22, 1998: Internal Revenue Service Restructuring and Reform Act of 1998 ("Taxpayer Bill of Rights III")
- August 7, 1998: Credit Union Membership Access Act
- August 7, 1998: Workforce Investment Act of 1998
- August 13, 1998: Biomaterials Access Assurance Act of 1998
- October 21, 1998: Children's Online Privacy Protection Act
- October 27, 1998: International Religious Freedom Act of 1998
- October 27, 1998: Copyright Term Extension Act ("Sonny Bono Copyright Term Extension Act")
- October 28, 1998: Digital Millennium Copyright Act (including WIPO Copyright and Performances and Phonograms Treaties Implementation Act and Online Copyright Infringement Liability Limitation Act)
- October 31, 1998: Iraq Liberation Act
- November 3, 1998: Securities Litigation Uniform Standards Act of 1998

== Major resolutions ==
- July 1997: Byrd–Hagel Resolution S.Res. 98 (Senate)
- December 19, 1998: Impeachment of Bill Clinton, H.Res. 611

== Party summary ==
=== Senate ===
Party standings in the 105th Congress 45 Democratic senators 55 Republican senators

There was no change in the parties during this Congress.

	Party (Shading indicates majority caucus)		Total	
	Republican	Democratic	Total	Vacant
End of previous Congress	53	47	100	0
105th Congress	55	45	100	0
Final voting share	55%	45%		
Beginning of the next Congress	55	45	100	0

=== House of Representatives ===
	Party (Shading indicates majority caucus)			Total	
	Republican	Democratic	Independent	Total	Vacant
End of previous Congress	234	198	1	433	2
Begin (January 3, 1997)	226	207	2	435	0
January 8, 1997 (Note: Rep. Bill Emerson (R-Missouri's 8th district) died during previous Congress. Jo Ann Emerson (R) was later elected to the seat as an Independent and switched to Republican.)	227	207	1	435	0
January 30, 1997	227	206	1	434	1
February 13, 1997	227	205	1	433	2
April 12, 1997	227	206	1	434	1
May 20, 1997	228	206	1	435	0
August 2, 1997	227	206	1	434	1
October 28, 1997	227	205	1	433	2
November 5, 1997	228	205	1	434	1
November 11, 1997	228	204	1	433	2
November 17, 1997	228	203	1	432	3
January 5, 1998	227	203	1	431	4
February 5, 1998	227	204	1	432	3
February 6, 1998	227	203	1	431	4
March 17, 1998	227	204	1	432	3
March 25, 1998	226	204	1	431	4
April 21, 1998	227	205	1	433	2
May 21, 1998	227	206	1	434	1
June 25, 1998	228	206	1	435	0
Final voting share	52.4%	47.4%	0.2%		
Non-voting members	1	4	0	5	0
Beginning of the next Congress	223	211	1	435	0

== Leadership ==
=== Senate ===
Senate President

Al Gore (D)

Senate President pro Tempore

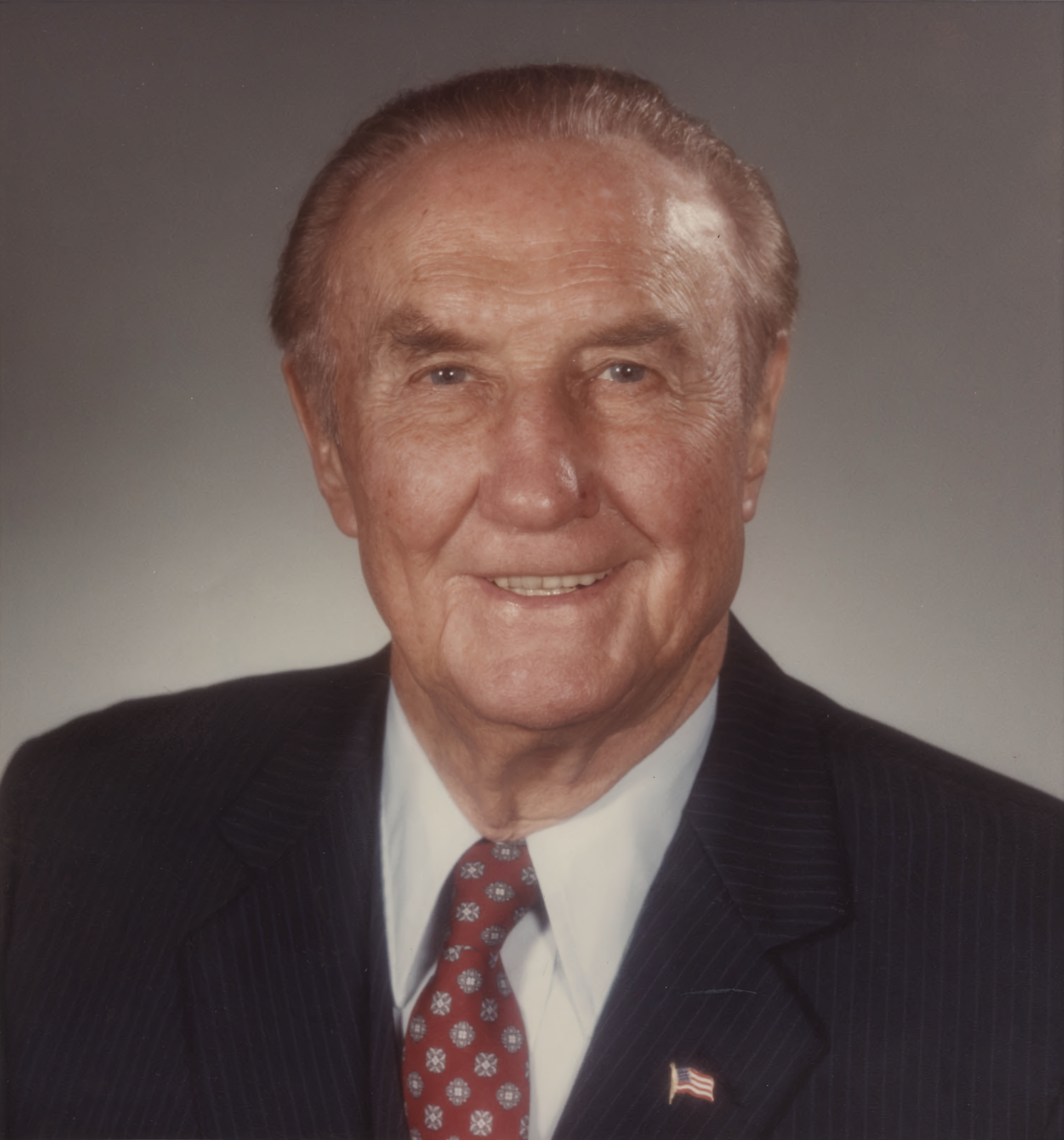
Strom Thurmond (R)

- President: Al Gore (D)
- President pro tempore: Strom Thurmond (R)

==== Majority (Republican) leadership ====
- Majority Leader: Trent Lott
- Majority Whip: Don Nickles
- Republican Conference Chairman: Connie Mack III
- Republican Conference Vice-Chairman: Paul Coverdell
- Policy Committee Chairman: Larry Craig
- Republican Campaign Committee Chairman: Mitch McConnell

==== Minority (Democratic) leadership ====
- Minority Leader: Tom Daschle
- Minority Whip: Wendell Ford
- Democratic Conference Chairman: Tom Daschle
- Democratic Conference Secretary: Barbara Mikulski
- Policy Committee Co-Chairs: Tom Daschle and Harry Reid
- Democratic Campaign Committee Chairman: Bob Kerrey
- Chief Deputy Whip: John Breaux

=== House of Representatives ===
Speaker of the House

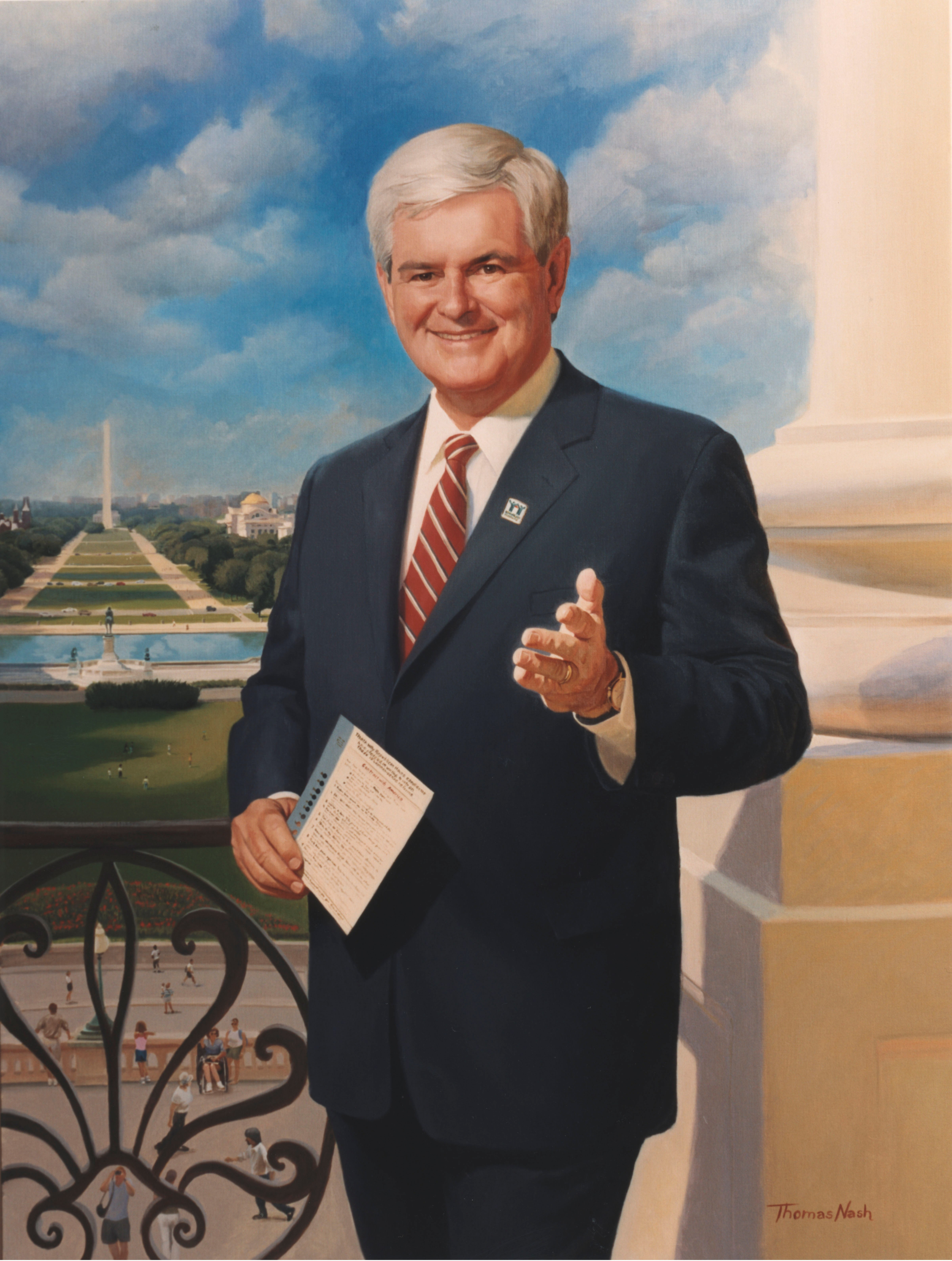
Newt Gingrich (R)

- Speaker: Newt Gingrich (R)

==== Majority (Republican) leadership ====
- Majority Leader: Dick Armey
- Majority Whip: Tom DeLay
- Chief Deputy Whip: Dennis Hastert
- Republican Conference Chairman: John Boehner
- Republican Conference Vice-Chairman: Susan Molinari, until July 17, 1997
  - Jennifer Dunn, after July 17, 1997
- Republican Conference Secretary: Jennifer Dunn, until July 17, 1997
  - Tillie Fowler, after July 17, 1997
- Policy Committee Chairman: Christopher Cox
- Republican Campaign Committee Chairman: John Linder

==== Minority (Democratic) leadership ====
- Minority Leader: Dick Gephardt
- Minority Whip: David Bonior
- Chief Deputy Minority Whips: Rosa DeLauro, Chet Edwards, John Lewis, & Bob Menendez
- Democratic Caucus Chairman: Vic Fazio
- Democratic Caucus Vice-Chairman: Barbara B. Kennelly
- Democratic Campaign Committee Chairman: Martin Frost

== Caucuses ==
- Armenian Caucus
- Biomedical Research Caucus
- Congressional Air Force Caucus
- Congressional Arts Caucus
- Congressional Asian Pacific American Caucus
- Congressional Automotive Caucus
- Congressional Bike Caucus
- Congressional Black Caucus
- Congressional Caucus on India and Indian Americans
- Congressional Caucus on Korea
- Congressional Fire Services Caucus
- Congressional Friends of Ireland Caucus
- Congressional Hispanic Caucus
- Congressional Mississippi River Caucus
- Congressional Motorsports Caucus
- Congressional Progressive Caucus
- Congressional Pediatric & Adult Hydrocephalus Caucus
- Congressional Portuguese-American Caucus
- Congressional Travel & Tourism Caucus
- Congressional Western Caucus
- Congresswomen's Caucus
- Hong Kong Caucus
- House Democratic Caucus
- House Recycling Caucus
- Hudson River Caucus
- Law Enforcement Caucus
- New Democrat Coalition
- Northern Border Caucus
- Renewable Energy and Energy Efficiency Caucus
- Senate Democratic Caucus

== Members ==
Skip to House of Representatives, below

=== Senate ===
In this Congress, Class 3 meant their term ended with this Congress, facing re-election in 1998; Class 1 meant their term began in the last Congress, facing re-election in 2000; and Class 2 meant their term began in this Congress, facing re-election in 2002.

==== Alabama ====
▌2. Jeff Sessions (R)
▌3. Richard Shelby (R)

==== Alaska ====
▌2. Ted Stevens (R)
▌3. Frank Murkowski (R)

==== Arizona ====
▌1. Jon Kyl (R)
▌3. John McCain (R)

==== Arkansas ====
▌2. Tim Hutchinson (R)
▌3. Dale Bumpers (D)

==== California ====
▌1. Dianne Feinstein (D)
▌3. Barbara Boxer (D)

==== Colorado ====
▌2. Wayne Allard (R)
▌3. Ben Nighthorse Campbell (R)

==== Connecticut ====
▌1. Joe Lieberman (D)
▌3. Chris Dodd (D)

==== Delaware ====
▌1. William Roth (R)
▌2. Joe Biden (D)

==== Florida ====
▌1. Connie Mack III (R)
▌3. Bob Graham (D)

==== Georgia ====
▌2. Max Cleland (D)
▌3. Paul Coverdell (R)

==== Hawaii ====
▌1. Daniel Akaka (D)
▌3. Daniel Inouye (D)

==== Idaho ====
▌2. Larry Craig (R)
▌3. Dirk Kempthorne (R)

==== Illinois ====
▌2. Dick Durbin (D)
▌3. Carol Moseley Braun (D)

==== Indiana ====
▌1. Dick Lugar (R)
▌3. Dan Coats (R)

==== Iowa ====
▌2. Tom Harkin (D)
▌3. Chuck Grassley (R)

==== Kansas ====
▌2. Pat Roberts (R)
▌3. Sam Brownback (R)

==== Kentucky ====
▌2. Mitch McConnell (R)
▌3. Wendell Ford (D)

==== Louisiana ====
▌2. Mary Landrieu (D)
▌3. John Breaux (D)

==== Maine ====
▌1. Olympia Snowe (R)
▌2. Susan Collins (R)

==== Maryland ====
▌1. Paul Sarbanes (D)
▌3. Barbara Mikulski (D)

==== Massachusetts ====
▌1. Ted Kennedy (D)
▌2. John Kerry (D)

==== Michigan ====
▌1. Spencer Abraham (R)
▌2. Carl Levin (D)

==== Minnesota ====
▌1. Rod Grams (R)
▌2. Paul Wellstone (DFL)

==== Mississippi ====
▌1. Trent Lott (R)
▌2. Thad Cochran (R)

==== Missouri ====
▌1. John Ashcroft (R)
▌3. Kit Bond (R)

==== Montana ====
▌1. Conrad Burns (R)
▌2. Max Baucus (D)

==== Nebraska ====
▌1. Bob Kerrey (D)
▌2. Chuck Hagel (R)

==== Nevada ====
▌1. Richard Bryan (D)
▌3. Harry Reid (D)

==== New Hampshire ====
▌2. Bob Smith (R)
▌3. Judd Gregg (R)

==== New Jersey ====
▌1. Frank Lautenberg (D)
▌2. Robert Torricelli (D)

==== New Mexico ====
▌1. Jeff Bingaman (D)
▌2. Pete Domenici (R)

==== New York ====
▌1. Daniel Patrick Moynihan (D)
▌3. Al D'Amato (R)

==== North Carolina ====
▌2. Jesse Helms (R)
▌3. Lauch Faircloth (R)

==== North Dakota ====
▌1. Kent Conrad (D-NPL)
▌3. Byron Dorgan (D-NPL)

==== Ohio ====
▌1. Mike DeWine (R)
▌3. John Glenn (D)

==== Oklahoma ====
▌2. James Inhofe (R)
▌3. Don Nickles (R)

==== Oregon ====
▌2. Gordon H. Smith (R)
▌3. Ron Wyden (D)

==== Pennsylvania ====
▌1. Rick Santorum (R)
▌3. Arlen Specter (R)

==== Rhode Island ====
▌1. John Chafee (R)
▌2. Jack Reed (D)

==== South Carolina ====
▌2. Strom Thurmond (R)
▌3. Fritz Hollings (D)

==== South Dakota ====
▌2. Tim Johnson (D)
▌3. Tom Daschle (D)

==== Tennessee ====
▌1. Bill Frist (R)
▌2. Fred Thompson (R)

==== Texas ====
▌1. Kay Bailey Hutchison (R)
▌2. Phil Gramm (R)

==== Utah ====
▌1. Orrin Hatch (R)
▌3. Bob Bennett (R)

==== Vermont ====
▌1. Jim Jeffords (R)
▌3. Patrick Leahy (D)

==== Virginia ====
▌1. Chuck Robb (D)
▌2. John Warner (R)

==== Washington ====
▌1. Slade Gorton (R)
▌3. Patty Murray (D)

==== West Virginia ====
▌1. Robert Byrd (D)
▌2. Jay Rockefeller (D)

==== Wisconsin ====
▌1. Herb Kohl (D)
▌3. Russ Feingold (D)

==== Wyoming ====
▌1. Craig L. Thomas (R)
▌2. Mike Enzi (R)

Senators' party membership by state at the opening of the 105th Congress in January 1997 2 Democrats 1 Democrat and 1 Republican 2 Republicans

Senate majority leadership

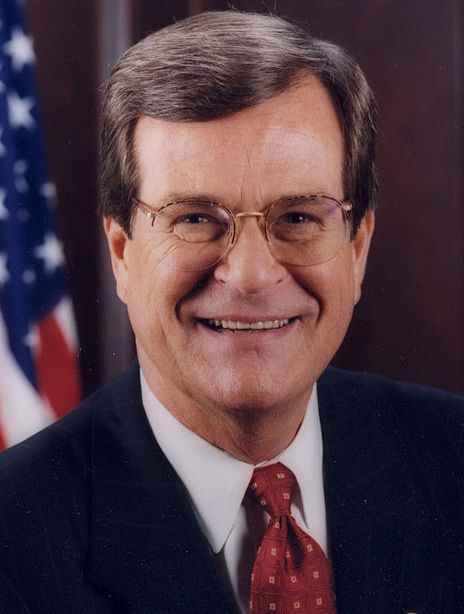
Republican leader
Trent Lott

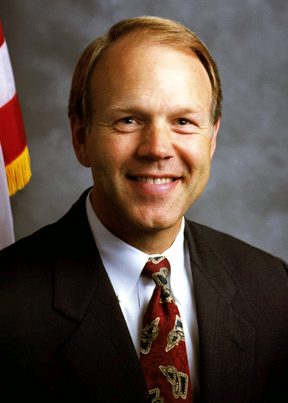
Republican whip
Don Nickles

Senate minority leadership

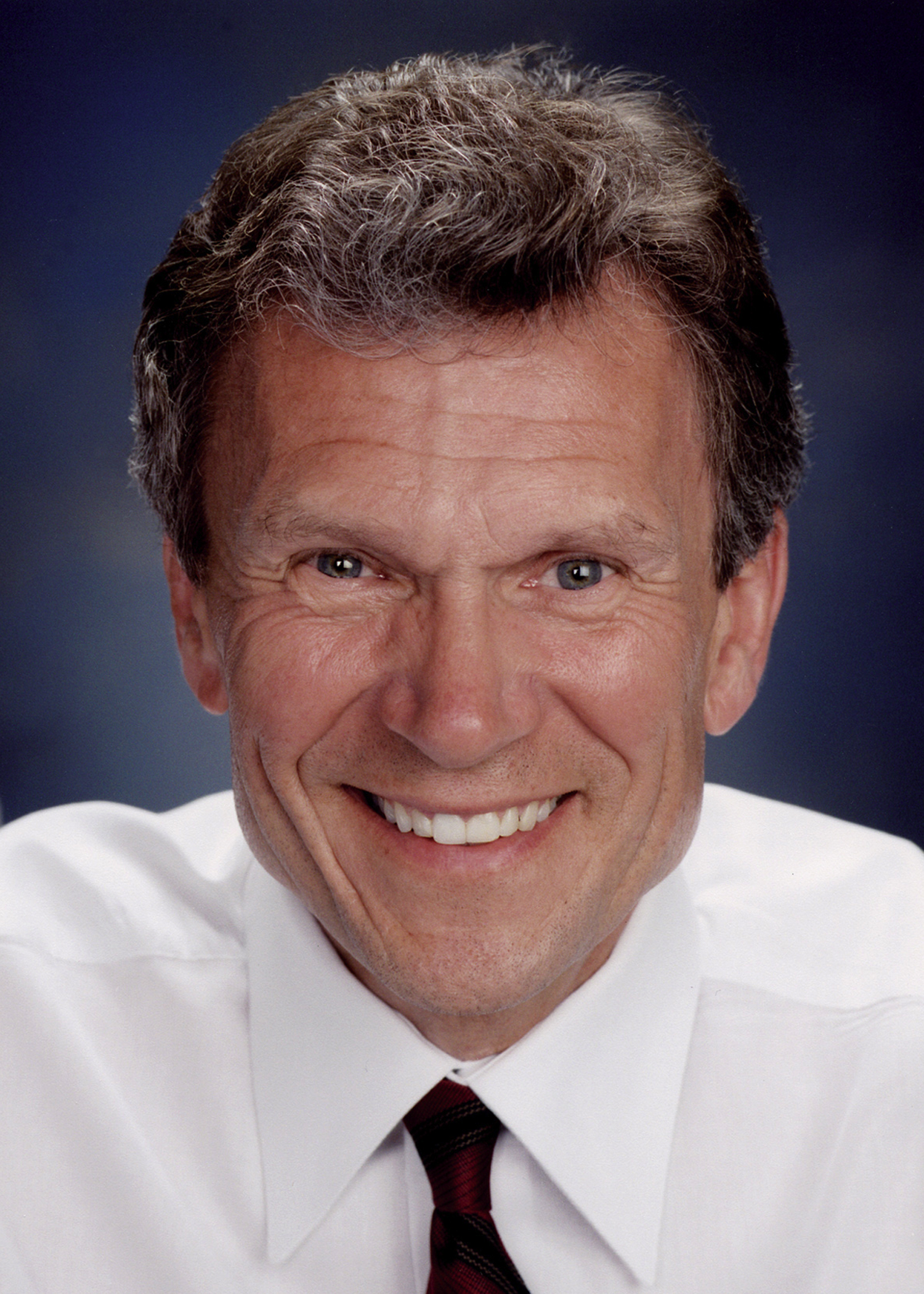
Democratic leader
Tom Daschle

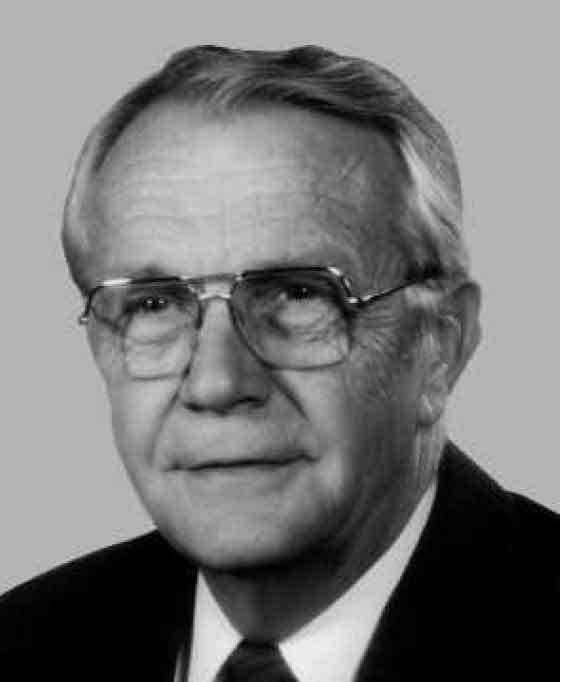
Democratic whip
Wendell Ford

=== House of Representatives ===
Representatives are listed by districts.

==== Alabama ====
▌1. Sonny Callahan (R)
▌2. Terry Everett (R)
▌3. Bob Riley (R)
▌4. Robert Aderholt (R)
▌5. Robert E. Cramer (D)
▌6. Spencer Bachus (R)
▌7. Earl Hilliard (D)

==== Alaska ====
▌At-large. Don Young (R)

==== Arizona ====
▌1. Matt Salmon (R)
▌2. Ed Pastor (D)
▌3. Bob Stump (R)
▌4. John Shadegg (R)
▌5. Jim Kolbe (R)
▌6. J. D. Hayworth (R)

==== Arkansas ====
▌1. Robert Marion Berry (D)
▌2. Vic Snyder (D)
▌3. Asa Hutchinson (R)
▌4. Jay Dickey (R)

==== California ====
▌1. Frank Riggs (R)
▌2. Wally Herger (R)
▌3. Vic Fazio (D)
▌4. John Doolittle (R)
▌5. Bob Matsui (D)
▌6. Lynn Woolsey (D)
▌7. George Miller (D)
▌8. Nancy Pelosi (D)
▌9. Ron Dellums (D), until February 6, 1998

▌Barbara Lee (D), from April 21, 1998

▌10. Ellen Tauscher (D)
▌11. Richard Pombo (R)
▌12. Tom Lantos (D)
▌13. Pete Stark (D)
▌14. Anna Eshoo (D)
▌15. Tom Campbell (R)
▌16. Zoe Lofgren (D)
▌17. Sam Farr (D)
▌18. Gary Condit (D)
▌19. George Radanovich (R)
▌20. Cal Dooley (D)
▌21. Bill Thomas (R)
▌22. Walter Capps (D), until October 28, 1997

▌Lois Capps (D), from March 17, 1998

▌23. Elton Gallegly (R)
▌24. Brad Sherman (D)
▌25. Buck McKeon (R)
▌26. Howard Berman (D)
▌27. James E. Rogan (R)
▌28. David Dreier (R)
▌29. Henry Waxman (D)
▌30. Xavier Becerra (D)
▌31. Matthew G. Martínez (D)
▌32. Julian Dixon (D)
▌33. Lucille Roybal-Allard (D)
▌34. Esteban Edward Torres (D)
▌35. Maxine Waters (D)
▌36. Jane Harman (D)
▌37. Juanita Millender-McDonald (D)
▌38. Steve Horn (R)
▌39. Ed Royce (R)
▌40. Jerry Lewis (R)
▌41. Jay Kim (R)
▌42. George Brown Jr. (D)
▌43. Ken Calvert (R)
▌44. Sonny Bono (R), until January 5, 1998

▌Mary Bono (R), from April 7, 1998

▌45. Dana Rohrabacher (R)
▌46. Loretta Sanchez (D)
▌47. Christopher Cox (R)
▌48. Ron Packard (R)
▌49. Brian Bilbray (R)
▌50. Bob Filner (D)
▌51. Duke Cunningham (R)
▌52. Duncan L. Hunter (R)

==== Colorado ====
▌1. Diana DeGette (D)
▌2. David Skaggs (D)
▌3. Scott McInnis (R)
▌4. Bob Schaffer (R)
▌5. Joel Hefley (R)
▌6. Dan Schaefer (R)

==== Connecticut ====
▌1. Barbara B. Kennelly (D)
▌2. Sam Gejdenson (D)
▌3. Rosa DeLauro (D)
▌4. Chris Shays (R)
▌5. James H. Maloney (D)
▌6. Nancy Johnson (R)

==== Delaware ====
▌At-large. Mike Castle (R)

==== Florida ====
▌1. Joe Scarborough (R)
▌2. Allen Boyd (D)
▌3. Corrine Brown (D)
▌4. Tillie Fowler (R)
▌5. Karen Thurman (D)
▌6. Cliff Stearns (R)
▌7. John Mica (R)
▌8. Bill McCollum (R)
▌9. Michael Bilirakis (R)
▌10. Bill Young (R)
▌11. Jim Davis (D)
▌12. Charles T. Canady (R)
▌13. Dan Miller (R)
▌14. Porter Goss (R)
▌15. Dave Weldon (R)
▌16. Mark Foley (R)
▌17. Carrie Meek (D)
▌18. Ileana Ros-Lehtinen (R)
▌19. Robert Wexler (D)
▌20. Peter Deutsch (D)
▌21. Lincoln Díaz-Balart (R)
▌22. Clay Shaw (R)
▌23. Alcee Hastings (D)

==== Georgia ====
▌1. Jack Kingston (R)
▌2. Sanford Bishop (D)
▌3. Mac Collins (R)
▌4. Cynthia McKinney (D)
▌5. John Lewis (D)
▌6. Newt Gingrich (R)
▌7. Bob Barr (R)
▌8. Saxby Chambliss (R)
▌9. Nathan Deal (R)
▌10. Charlie Norwood (R)
▌11. John Linder (R)

==== Hawaii ====
▌1. Neil Abercrombie (D)
▌2. Patsy Mink (D)

==== Idaho ====
▌1. Helen Chenoweth (R)
▌2. Mike Crapo (R)

==== Illinois ====
▌1. Bobby Rush (D)
▌2. Jesse Jackson Jr. (D)
▌3. Bill Lipinski (D)
▌4. Luis Gutierrez (D)
▌5. Rod Blagojevich (D)
▌6. Henry Hyde (R)
▌7. Danny K. Davis (D)
▌8. Phil Crane (R)
▌9. Sidney Yates (D)
▌10. John Porter (R)
▌11. Jerry Weller (R)
▌12. Jerry Costello (D)
▌13. Harris W. Fawell (R)
▌14. Dennis Hastert (R)
▌15. Thomas W. Ewing (R)
▌16. Don Manzullo (R)
▌17. Lane Evans (D)
▌18. Ray LaHood (R)
▌19. Glenn Poshard (D)
▌20. John Shimkus (R)

==== Indiana ====
▌1. Pete Visclosky (D)
▌2. David M. McIntosh (R)
▌3. Tim Roemer (D)
▌4. Mark Souder (R)
▌5. Steve Buyer (R)
▌6. Dan Burton (R)
▌7. Edward A. Pease (R)
▌8. John Hostettler (R)
▌9. Lee H. Hamilton (D)
▌10. Julia Carson (D)

==== Iowa ====
▌1. Jim Leach (R)
▌2. Jim Nussle (R)
▌3. Leonard Boswell (D)
▌4. Greg Ganske (R)
▌5. Tom Latham (R)

==== Kansas ====
▌1. Jerry Moran (R)
▌2. Jim Ryun (R)
▌3. Vince Snowbarger (R)
▌4. Todd Tiahrt (R)

==== Kentucky ====
▌1. Ed Whitfield (R)
▌2. Ron Lewis (R)
▌3. Anne Northup (R)
▌4. Jim Bunning (R)
▌5. Hal Rogers (R)
▌6. Scotty Baesler (D)

==== Louisiana ====
▌1. Bob Livingston (R)
▌2. William J. Jefferson (D)
▌3. Billy Tauzin (R)
▌4. Jim McCrery (R)
▌5. John Cooksey (R)
▌6. Richard H. Baker (R)
▌7. Chris John (D)

==== Maine ====
▌1. Tom Allen (D)
▌2. John Baldacci (D)

==== Maryland ====
▌1. Wayne Gilchrest (R)
▌2. Bob Ehrlich (R)
▌3. Ben Cardin (D)
▌4. Albert Wynn (D)
▌5. Steny Hoyer (D)
▌6. Roscoe Bartlett (R)
▌7. Elijah Cummings (D)
▌8. Connie Morella (R)

==== Massachusetts ====
▌1. John Olver (D)
▌2. Richard Neal (D)
▌3. Jim McGovern (D)
▌4. Barney Frank (D)
▌5. Marty Meehan (D)
▌6. John F. Tierney (D)
▌7. Ed Markey (D)
▌8. Joseph P. Kennedy II (D)
▌9. Joe Moakley (D)
▌10. Bill Delahunt (D)

==== Michigan ====
▌1. Bart Stupak (D)
▌2. Pete Hoekstra (R)
▌3. Vern Ehlers (R)
▌4. Dave Camp (R)
▌5. James A. Barcia (D)
▌6. Fred Upton (R)
▌7. Nick Smith (R)
▌8. Debbie Stabenow (D)
▌9. Dale Kildee (D)
▌10. David Bonior (D)
▌11. Joe Knollenberg (R)
▌12. Sander Levin (D)
▌13. Lynn N. Rivers (D)
▌14. John Conyers (D)
▌15. Carolyn Cheeks Kilpatrick (D)
▌16. John Dingell (D)

==== Minnesota ====
▌1. Gil Gutknecht (R)
▌2. David Minge (DFL)
▌3. Jim Ramstad (R)
▌4. Bruce Vento (DFL)
▌5. Martin Olav Sabo (DFL)
▌6. Bill Luther (DFL)
▌7. Collin Peterson (DFL)
▌8. Jim Oberstar (DFL)

==== Mississippi ====
▌1. Roger Wicker (R)
▌2. Bennie Thompson (D)
▌3. Chip Pickering (R)
▌4. Michael Parker (R)
▌5. Gene Taylor (D)

==== Missouri ====
▌1. Bill Clay (D)
▌2. Jim Talent (R)
▌3. Dick Gephardt (D)
▌4. Ike Skelton (D)
▌5. Karen McCarthy (D)
▌6. Pat Danner (D)
▌7. Roy Blunt (R)
▌▌8. Jo Ann Emerson (I), changed to (R) on January 8, 1997
▌9. Kenny Hulshof (R)

==== Montana ====
▌At-large. Rick Hill (R)

==== Nebraska ====
▌1. Doug Bereuter (R)
▌2. Jon Lynn Christensen (R)
▌3. Bill Barrett (R)

==== Nevada ====
▌1. John Ensign (R)
▌2. Jim Gibbons (R)

==== New Hampshire ====
▌1. John E. Sununu (R)
▌2. Charles Bass (R)

==== New Jersey ====
▌1. Rob Andrews (D)
▌2. Frank LoBiondo (R)
▌3. Jim Saxton (R)
▌4. Chris Smith (R)
▌5. Marge Roukema (R)
▌6. Frank Pallone (D)
▌7. Bob Franks (R)
▌8. Bill Pascrell (D)
▌9. Steve Rothman (D)
▌10. Donald M. Payne (D)
▌11. Rodney Frelinghuysen (R)
▌12. Michael James Pappas (R)
▌13. Bob Menendez (D)

==== New Mexico ====
▌1. Steven Schiff (R), until March 25, 1998

▌Heather Wilson (R), from June 25, 1998

▌2. Joe Skeen (R)
▌3. Bill Richardson (D), until February 13, 1997

▌Bill Redmond (R), from May 13, 1997

==== New York ====
▌1. Michael Forbes (R)
▌2. Rick Lazio (R)
▌3. Peter T. King (R)
▌4. Carolyn McCarthy (D)
▌5. Gary Ackerman (D)
▌6. Floyd Flake (D), until November 17, 1997

▌Gregory Meeks (D), from February 3, 1998

▌7. Thomas J. Manton (D)
▌8. Jerry Nadler (D)
▌9. Chuck Schumer (D)
▌10. Edolphus Towns (D)
▌11. Major Owens (D)
▌12. Nydia Velázquez (D)
▌13. Susan Molinari (R), until August 2, 1997

▌Vito Fossella (R), from November 4, 1997

▌14. Carolyn Maloney (D)
▌15. Charles Rangel (D)
▌16. José E. Serrano (D)
▌17. Eliot Engel (D)
▌18. Nita Lowey (D)
▌19. Sue W. Kelly (R)
▌20. Benjamin Gilman (R)
▌21. Michael R. McNulty (D)
▌22. Gerald Solomon (R)
▌23. Sherwood Boehlert (R)
▌24. John M. McHugh (R)
▌25. James T. Walsh (R)
▌26. Maurice Hinchey (D)
▌27. Bill Paxon (R)
▌28. Louise Slaughter (D)
▌29. John J. LaFalce (D)
▌30. Jack Quinn (R)
▌31. Amo Houghton (R)

==== North Carolina ====
▌1. Eva Clayton (D)
▌2. Bob Etheridge (D)
▌3. Walter B. Jones Jr. (R)
▌4. David Price (D)
▌5. Richard Burr (R)
▌6. Howard Coble (R)
▌7. Mike McIntyre (D)
▌8. Bill Hefner (D)
▌9. Sue Myrick (R)
▌10. Cass Ballenger (R)
▌11. Charles H. Taylor (R)
▌12. Mel Watt (D)

==== North Dakota ====
▌At-large. Earl Pomeroy (D-NPL)

==== Ohio ====
▌1. Steve Chabot (R)
▌2. Rob Portman (R)
▌3. Tony P. Hall (D)
▌4. Mike Oxley (R)
▌5. Paul Gillmor (R)
▌6. Ted Strickland (D)
▌7. Dave Hobson (R)
▌8. John Boehner (R)
▌9. Marcy Kaptur (D)
▌10. Dennis Kucinich (D)
▌11. Louis Stokes (D)
▌12. John Kasich (R)
▌13. Sherrod Brown (D)
▌14. Thomas C. Sawyer (D)
▌15. Deborah Pryce (R)
▌16. Ralph Regula (R)
▌17. James Traficant (D)
▌18. Bob Ney (R)
▌19. Steve LaTourette (R)

==== Oklahoma ====
▌1. Steve Largent (R)
▌2. Tom Coburn (R)
▌3. Wes Watkins (R)
▌4. J. C. Watts (R)
▌5. Ernest Istook (R)
▌6. Frank Lucas (R)

==== Oregon ====
▌1. Elizabeth Furse (D)
▌2. Robert Freeman Smith (R)
▌3. Earl Blumenauer (D)
▌4. Peter DeFazio (D)
▌5. Darlene Hooley (D)

==== Pennsylvania ====
▌1. Thomas M. Foglietta (D), until November 11, 1997

▌Bob Brady (D), from May 19, 1998

▌2. Chaka Fattah (D)
▌3. Robert A. Borski Jr. (D)
▌4. Ron Klink (D)
▌5. John E. Peterson (R)
▌6. Tim Holden (D)
▌7. Curt Weldon (R)
▌8. James C. Greenwood (R)
▌9. Bud Shuster (R)
▌10. Joseph M. McDade (R)
▌11. Paul Kanjorski (D)
▌12. John Murtha (D)
▌13. Jon D. Fox (R)
▌14. William J. Coyne (D)
▌15. Paul McHale (D)
▌16. Joe Pitts (R)
▌17. George Gekas (R)
▌18. Mike Doyle (D)
▌19. William F. Goodling (R)
▌20. Frank Mascara (D)
▌21. Phil English (R)

==== Rhode Island ====
▌1. Patrick J. Kennedy (D)
▌2. Robert Weygand (D)

==== South Carolina ====
▌1. Mark Sanford (R)
▌2. Floyd Spence (R)
▌3. Lindsey Graham (R)
▌4. Bob Inglis (R)
▌5. John Spratt (D)
▌6. Jim Clyburn (D)

==== South Dakota ====
▌At-large. John Thune (R)

==== Tennessee ====
▌1. Bill Jenkins (R)
▌2. Jimmy Duncan (R)
▌3. Zach Wamp (R)
▌4. Van Hilleary (R)
▌5. Bob Clement (D)
▌6. Bart Gordon (D)
▌7. Ed Bryant (R)
▌8. John S. Tanner (D)
▌9. Harold Ford Jr. (D)

==== Texas ====
▌1. Max Sandlin (D)
▌2. Jim Turner (D)
▌3. Sam Johnson (R)
▌4. Ralph Hall (D)
▌5. Pete Sessions (R)
▌6. Joe Barton (R)
▌7. Bill Archer (R)
▌8. Kevin Brady (R)
▌9. Nick Lampson (D)
▌10. Lloyd Doggett (D)
▌11. Chet Edwards (D)
▌12. Kay Granger (R)
▌13. Mac Thornberry (R)
▌14. Ron Paul (R)
▌15. Rubén Hinojosa (D)
▌16. Silvestre Reyes (D)
▌17. Charles Stenholm (D)
▌18. Sheila Jackson-Lee (D)
▌19. Larry Combest (R)
▌20. Henry B. González (D)
▌21. Lamar Smith (R)
▌22. Tom DeLay (R)
▌23. Henry Bonilla (R)
▌24. Martin Frost (D)
▌25. Ken Bentsen Jr. (D)
▌26. Dick Armey (R)
▌27. Solomon P. Ortiz (D)
▌28. Frank Tejeda (D), until January 30, 1997

▌Ciro Rodriguez (D), from April 12, 1997

▌29. Gene Green (D)
▌30. Eddie Bernice Johnson (D)

==== Utah ====
▌1. James V. Hansen (R)
▌2. Merrill Cook (R)
▌3. Chris Cannon (R)

==== Vermont ====
▌At-large. Bernie Sanders (I)

==== Virginia ====
▌1. Herbert H. Bateman (R)
▌2. Owen B. Pickett (D)
▌3. Bobby Scott (D)
▌4. Norman Sisisky (D)
▌5. Virgil Goode (D)
▌6. Bob Goodlatte (R)
▌7. Thomas J. Bliley Jr. (R)
▌8. Jim Moran (D)
▌9. Rick Boucher (D)
▌10. Frank Wolf (R)
▌11. Tom Davis (R)

==== Washington ====
▌1. Rick White (R)
▌2. Jack Metcalf (R)
▌3. Linda Smith (R)
▌4. Doc Hastings (R)
▌5. George Nethercutt (R)
▌6. Norm Dicks (D)
▌7. Jim McDermott (D)
▌8. Jennifer Dunn (R)
▌9. Adam Smith (D)

==== West Virginia ====
▌1. Alan Mollohan (D)
▌2. Bob Wise (D)
▌3. Nick Rahall (D)

==== Wisconsin ====
▌1. Mark Neumann (R)
▌2. Scott L. Klug (R)
▌3. Ron Kind (D)
▌4. Jerry Kleczka (D)
▌5. Tom Barrett (D)
▌6. Tom Petri (R)
▌7. Dave Obey (D)
▌8. Jay W. Johnson (D)
▌9. Jim Sensenbrenner (R)

==== Wyoming ====
▌At-large. Barbara Cubin (R)

==== Non-voting delegations ====
▌American Samoa. Eni Faleomavaega (D)
▌District of Columbia. Eleanor Holmes Norton (D)
▌Guam. Robert A. Underwood (D)
▌Virgin Islands. Donna Christian-Christensen (D)
▌Puerto Rico. Carlos Romero Barceló (Resident Commissioner) (D/PNP)

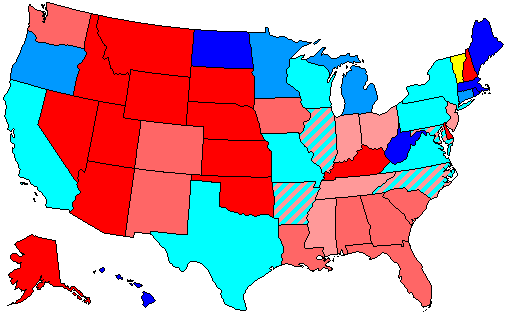
House seats by party holding plurality in state: 80+% to 100% Democratic / 80+% to 100% Republican; 60+% to 80% Democratic / 60+% to 80% Republican; Up to 60% Democratic / Up to 60% Republican; Striped: 50–50 split 1 independent

House majority leadership

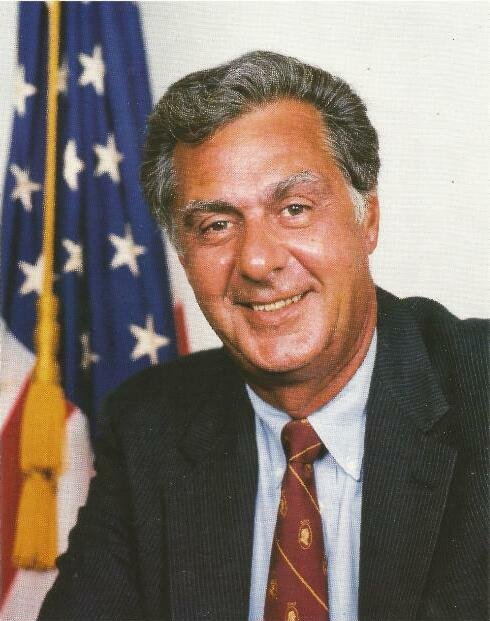
Republican leader
Dick Armey

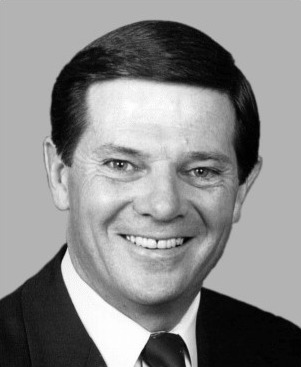
Republican whip
Tom DeLay

House minority leadership

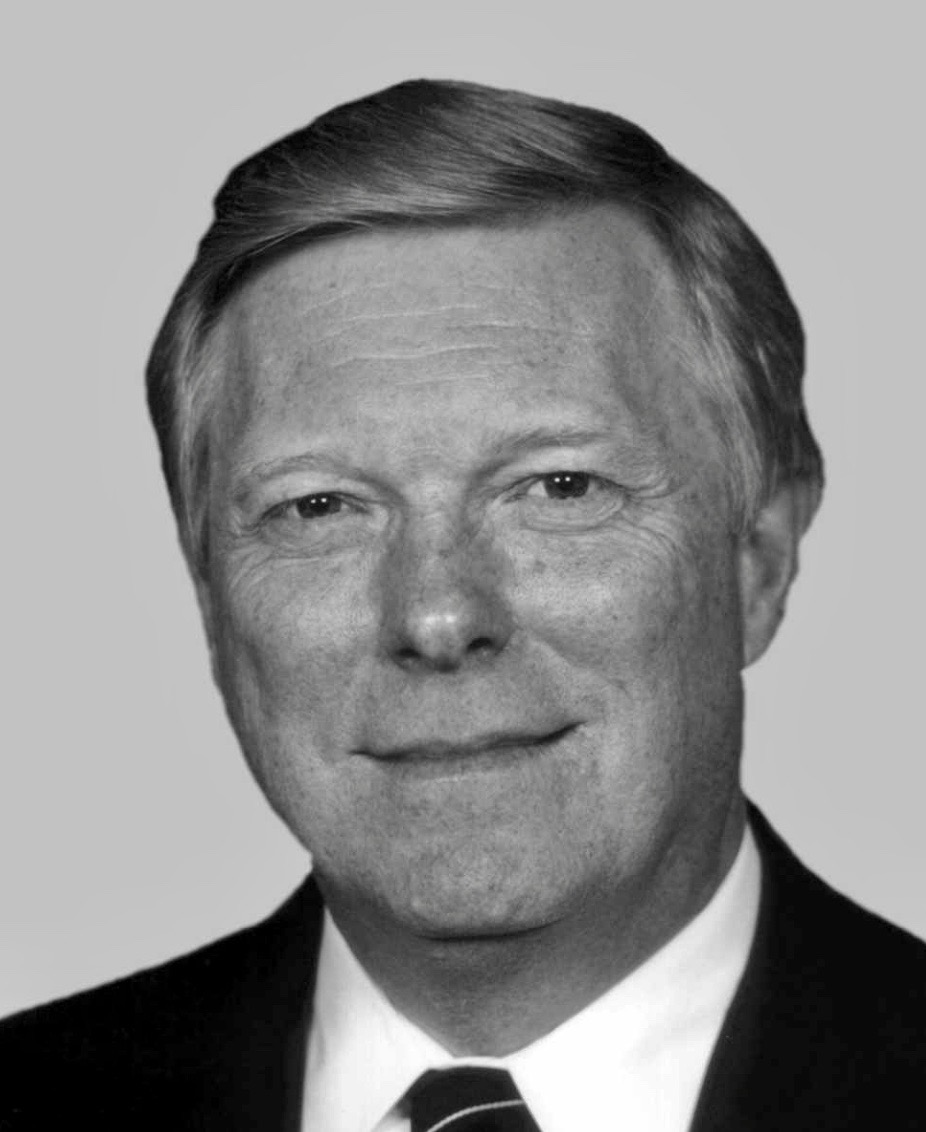
Democratic leader
Dick Gephardt

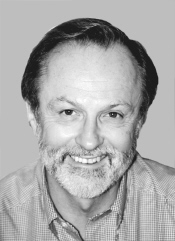
Democratic whip
David Bonior

== Changes in membership ==
=== Senate ===
There were no changes in Senate membership during this Congress.

=== House of Representatives ===
Four members of the House of Representatives died, and four resigned.

House changes
District	Vacated by	Reason for change	Successor	Date of successor's formal installation (Note: When seated or oath administered, not necessarily when service began.)
Texas's 28th	Frank Tejeda (D)	Died January 30, 1997	Ciro Rodriguez (D)	April 12, 1997
New Mexico 3rd	Bill Richardson (D)	Resigned February 13, 1997, to become Ambassador to the United Nations	Bill Redmond (R)	May 20, 1997
New York 13th	Susan Molinari (R)	Resigned August 2, 1997, to become a television journalist for CBS	Vito Fossella (R)	November 5, 1997
California 22nd	Walter Capps (D)	Died October 28, 1997	Lois Capps (D)	March 17, 1998
Pennsylvania 1st	Thomas M. Foglietta (D)	Resigned November 11, 1997, to become Ambassador to Italy	Bob Brady (D)	May 21, 1998
New York 6th	Floyd Flake (D)	Resigned November 17, 1997, to return full-time to his duties as pastor of Allen A.M.E. Church	Gregory Meeks (D)	February 5, 1998
California 44th	Sonny Bono (R)	Died January 5, 1998	Mary Bono (R)	April 21, 1998
California 9th	Ron Dellums (D)	Resigned February 6, 1998	Barbara Lee (D)	April 21, 1998
New Mexico 1st	Steven Schiff (R)	Died March 25, 1998	Heather Wilson (R)	June 25, 1998

== Committees ==
Lists of committees and their party leaders for members of the House and Senate committees can be found through the Official Congressional Directory at the bottom of this article. The directory after the pages of terms of service lists committees of the Senate, House (Standing with Subcommittees, Select and Special) and Joint and, after that, House/Senate committee assignments. On the committees section of the House and Senate in the Official Congressional Directory, the committee's members on the first row on the left side shows the chairman of the committee and on the right side shows the ranking member of the committee.

=== Senate ===
- Aging (Special) (Chuck Grassley, Chair; John Breaux, Ranking Member)
- Agriculture, Nutrition and Forestry (Richard Lugar, Chair; Tom Harkin, Ranking Member)
  - Forestry, Conservation and Rural Revitalization (Rick Santorum, Chair; Kent Conrad, Ranking Member)
  - Marketing Inspection and Product Promotion (Paul Coverdell, Chair; Max Baucus, Ranking Member)
  - Production and Price Competitiveness (Thad Cochran, Chair; J. Robert Kerrey, Ranking Member)
  - Research, Nutrition and General Legislation (Mitch McConnell, Chair; Patrick Leahy, Ranking Member)
- Appropriations (Ted Stevens, Chair; Robert C. Byrd, Ranking Member)
  - Agriculture, Rural Development and Related Agencies (Thad Cochran, Chair; Dale Bumpers, Ranking Member)
  - Commerce, Justice, State and Judiciary (Judd Gregg, Chair; Ernest F. Hollings, Ranking Member)
  - Defense (Ted Stevens, Chair; Daniel Inouye, Ranking Member)
  - District of Columbia (Lauch Faircloth, Chair; Barbara Boxer, Ranking Member)
  - Energy and Water Development (Pete Domenici, Chair; Harry Reid, Ranking Member)
  - Foreign Operations (Mitch McConnell, Chair; Patrick Leahy, Ranking Member)
  - Interior (Slade Gorton, Chair; Robert Byrd, Ranking Member)
  - Labor, Health, Human Services and Education (Arlen Specter, Chair; Tom Harkin, Ranking Member)
  - Legislative Branch (Robert F. Bennett, Chair; Byron Dorgan, Ranking Member)
  - Military Construction (Conrad Burns, Chair; Patty Murray, Ranking Member)
  - Transportation (Richard Shelby, Chair; Frank Lautenberg, Ranking Member)
  - Treasury and General Government (Richard Shelby, Chair; Frank Lautenberg, Ranking Member)
  - VA, HUD and Independent Agencies (Kit Bond, Chair; Barbara A. Mikulski, Ranking Member)
- Armed Services (Strom Thurmond, Chair; Carl Levin, Ranking Member)
  - Acquisition and Technology (Rick Santorum, Chair; Joe Lieberman, Ranking Member)
  - Airland Forces (Dan Coats, Chair; John Glenn, Ranking Member)
  - Personnel (Dirk Kempthorne, Chair; Max Cleland, Ranking Member)
  - Readiness (Jim Inhofe, Chair; Chuck Robb, Ranking Member)
  - Seapower (John Warner, Chair; Edward Kennedy, Ranking Member)
  - Strategic Forces (Bob Smith, Chair; Jeff Bingaman, Ranking Member)
- Banking, Housing and Urban Affairs (Al D'Amato, Chair; Paul Sarbanes, Ranking Member)
  - Financial Institutions and Regulatory Relief (Lauch Faircloth, Chair; Richard Bryan, Ranking Member)
  - Financial Services and Technology (Robert F. Bennett, Chair; Barbara Boxer, Ranking Member)
  - Housing Opportunity and Community Development (Connie Mack III, Chair; John F. Kerry, Ranking Member)
  - International Finance (Rod Grams, Chair; Carol Moseley-Braun, Ranking Member)
  - Securities (Phil Gramm, Chair; Chris Dodd, Ranking Member)
- Budget (Pete Domenici, Chair; Frank Lautenberg, Ranking Member)
- Commerce, Science and Transportation (John McCain, Chair; Ernest F. Hollings, Ranking Member)
  - Aviation (Slade Gorton, Chair; Wendell Ford, Ranking Member)
  - Communications (Conrad Burns, Chair; Ernest F. Hollings, Ranking Member)
  - Consumer Affairs, Foreign Commerce and Tourism (John Ashcroft, Chair; John Breaux, Ranking Member)
  - Manufacturing and Competitiveness (Spencer Abraham, Chair; Richard Bryan, Ranking Member)
  - Oceans and Fisheries (Olympia Snowe, Chair; John Kerry, Ranking Member)
  - Science, Technology and Space (Bill Frist, Chair; John D. Rockefeller IV, Ranking Member)
  - Surface Transportation and Merchant Marine (Kay Bailey Hutchison, Chair; Daniel K. Inouye, Ranking Member)
- Energy and Natural Resources (Frank H. Murkowski, Chair; Dale Bumpers, Ranking Member)
  - Energy Research, Development, Production and Regulation (Don Nickles, Chair; Pete Domenici, Vice Chair)
  - Forests and Public Land Management (Larry E. Craig, Chair; Conrad Burns, Vice Chair)
  - National Parks, Historic Preservation and Recreation (Craig L. Thomas, Chair; Ben Nighthorse Campbell, Vice Chair)
  - Water and Power (Jon Kyl, Chair; Bob Smith, Vice Chair)
- Environment and Public Works (John H. Chafee, Chair; Max Baucus, Ranking Member)
  - Clean Air, Wetlands, Private Property and Nuclear Safety (Jim Inhofe, Chair; Bob Graham, Ranking Member)
  - Drinking Water, Fisheries and Wildlife (Dirk Kempthorne, Chair; Harry Reid, Ranking Member)
  - Superfund, Waste Control and Risk Assessment (Bob Smith, Chair; Frank Lautenberg, Ranking Member)
  - Transportation and Infrastructure (John Warner, Chair; Max Baucus, Ranking Member)
- Ethics (Select) (Bob Smith, Chair; Harry Reid, Vice Chair)
- Finance (Bill Roth, Chair; Daniel Moynihan, Ranking Member)
  - Health Care (Phil Gramm, Chair; John D. Rockefeller IV, Ranking Member)
  - International Trade (Chuck Grassley, Chair; Daniel Moynihan, Ranking Member)
  - Long-Term Growth, Debt and Deficit Reduction (Connie Mack III, Chair; Bob Graham, Ranking Member)
  - Social Security and Family Policy (John Chafee, Chair; John Breaux, Ranking Member)
  - Taxation and IRS Oversight (Don Nickles, Chair; Max Baucus, Ranking Member)
- Foreign Relations (Jesse Helms, Chair; Joe Biden, Ranking Member)
  - African Affairs (John Ashcroft, Chair; Russ Feingold, Ranking Member)
  - East Asian and Pacific Affairs (Craig Thomas, Chair; John Kerry, Ranking Member)
  - European Affairs (Bob Smith, Chair; Joe Biden, Ranking Member)
  - International Economic Policy, Export and Trade Promotion (Chuck Hagel, Chair; Paul Sarbanes, Ranking Member)
  - International Operations (Rod Grams, Chair; Dianne Feinstein, Ranking Member)
  - Near Eastern and South Asian Affairs (Sam Brownback, Chair; Chuck Robb, Ranking Member)
  - Western Hemisphere, Peace Corps, Narcotics and Terrorism (Paul Coverdell, Chair; Chris Dodd, Ranking Member)
- Governmental Affairs (Fred Thompson, Chair; John Glenn, Ranking Member)
  - International Security, Proliferation and Federal Services (Thad Cochran, Chair; Sander Levin, Ranking Member)
  - Oversight of Government Management, Restructuring and the District of Columbia (Sam Brownback, Chair; Joe Lieberman, Ranking Member)
  - Permanent Subcommittee on Investigations (Susan Collins, Chair; John Glenn, Ranking Member)
- Indian Affairs (Select) (Ben Nighthorse Campbell, Chair; Daniel K. Inouye, Vice Chair)
- Judiciary (Orrin Hatch, Chair; Patrick Leahy, Ranking Member)
  - Administrative Oversight and the Courts (Chuck Grassley, Chair; Richard Durbin, Ranking Member)
  - Antitrust, Business Rights and Competition (Chuck Grassley, Chair; Richard Durbin, Ranking Member)
  - Constitution, Federalism and Property Rights (Mike DeWine, Chair; Herb Kohl, Ranking Member)
  - Immigration (Spencer Abraham, Chair; Edward Kennedy, Ranking Member)
  - Technology, Terrorism and Government Information (Jon Kyl, Chair; Dianne Feinstein, Ranking Member)
  - Youth Violence (Jeff Sessions, Chair; Joe Biden, Ranking Member)
- Intelligence (Select) (Richard C. Shelby, Chair; J. Robert Kerrey, Ranking Member)
- Labor and Human Resources (Jim Jeffords, Chair; Edward Kennedy, Ranking Member)
  - Aging (Judd Gregg, Chair; Barbara Mikulski, Ranking Member)
  - Children and Families (Dan Coats, Chair; Chris Dodd, Ranking Member)
  - Employment and Training (Mike DeWine, Chair; Paul Wellstone, Ranking Member)
  - Public Health and Safety (Bill Frist, Chair; Edward Kennedy, Ranking Member)
- Rules and Administration (John Warner, Chair; Wendell H. Ford, Ranking Member)
- Small Business (Kit Bond, Chair; John Kerry, Ranking Member)
- Veterans' Affairs (Arlen Specter, Chair; John D. Rockefeller IV, Ranking Member)
- Year 2000 Technology Problem (Select)

=== House of Representatives ===
- Agriculture (Robert F. Smith, Chair; Larry Combest, Ranking Member)
  - Departments Operations, Nutrition and Foreign Agriculture (Bob Goodlatte, Chair; Thomas Ewing, Ranking Member)
  - Forestry, Resource Conservation and Research (Larry Combest, Chair; Bill Barrett, Ranking Member)
  - General Farm Commodities (Bill Barrett, Chair; Larry Combest, Ranking Member)
  - Livestock, Dairy and Poultry (Richard Pombo, Chair; John Boehner, Ranking Member)
  - Risk Management and Specialty Crops (Thomas Ewing, Chair; Larry Combest, Ranking Member)
- Appropriations (Bob Livingston, Chair; Dave Obey, Ranking Member)
  - Agriculture, Rural Development, Food and Drug Administration and Related Agencies (Joe Skeen, Chair; Marcy Kaptur, Ranking Member)
  - Commerce, Justice, State and Judiciary (Hal Rogers, Chair; Alan Mollohan, Ranking Member)
  - District of Columbia (Charlie H. Taylor, Chair; Jim Moran, Ranking Member)
  - Energy and Water Development (Joseph McDade, Chair; Vic Fazio, Ranking Member)
  - Foreign Operations, Export Financing and Related Programs (Sonny Callahan, Chair; Nancy Pelosi, Ranking Member)
  - Interior (Ralph Regula, Chair; Sidney Yates, Ranking Member)
  - Labor, Health, Human Services and Education (John E. Porter, Chair; Dave Obey, Ranking Member)
  - Legislative (James T. Walsh, Chair; Jose Serrano, Ranking Member)
  - Military Construction (Ron Packard, Chair; Bill Hefner, Ranking Member)
  - National Security (Don Young, Chair; John P. Murtha, Ranking Member)
  - Transportation (Frank R. Wolf, Chair; Martin Olav Sabo, Ranking Member)
  - Treasury, Postal Service and General Government (Jim Kolbe, Chair; Steny Hoyer, Ranking Member)
  - VA, HUD and Independent Agencies (John Lewis, Chair; Louis Stokes, Ranking Member)
- Banking and Financial Services (Jim Leach, Chair; Henry B. Gonzalez, Ranking Member)
  - Capital Markets, Securities and Government Sponsored Enterprises (Richard H. Baker, Chair; Frank D. Lucas, Vice Chair)
  - Domestic and International Monetary Policy (Michael Castle, Chair; Jon Fox, Vice Chair)
  - Financial Institutions and Consumer Credit (Marge Roukema, Chair; Bill McCollum, Vice Chair)
  - General Oversight and Investigations (Spencer Bachus, Chair; Bob Riley, Vice Chair)
  - Housing and Community Opportunity (Rick Lazio, Chair; Bob Ney, Vice Chair)
- Budget (John Kasich, Chair; John Spratt, Ranking Member)
- Commerce (Thomas J. Bliley, Chair; Paul E. Gillmor, Ranking Member)
  - Energy and Power (Bob Schaffer, Chair; Mike Crapo, Ranking Member)
  - Finance and Hazardous Materials (Mike Oxley, Chair; Billy Tauzin, Ranking Member)
  - Health and Environment (Michael Bilirakis, Chair; Dennis Hastert, Ranking Member)
  - Oversight and Investigations (Joe Barton, Chair; Christopher Cox, Ranking Member)
  - Telecommunications, Trade and Consumer Protection (Billy Tauzin, Chair; Mike Oxley, Ranking Member)
- Education and the Workforce (Bill Goodling, Chair; Tom Petri, Vice Chair)
  - Early Childhood, Youth and Families (Frank Riggs, Chair; Michael Castle, Vice Chair)
  - Employer-Employee Relations (Harris W. Fawell, Chair; Joe Knollenberg, Vice Chair)
  - Oversight and Investigations (Peter Hoekstra, Chair; Charlie Norwood, Vice Chair)
  - Postsecondary Education, Training and Life-Long Learning (Buck McKeon, Chair; Bob Graham, Vice Chair)
  - Workforce Protections (Cass Ballenger, Chair; Harris Fawell, Vice Chair)
- Government Reform and Oversight (Dan Burton, Chair; Henry Waxman, Vice Chair)
  - Civil Service (John Mica, Chair; Mike Pappas, Ranking Member)
  - District of Columbia (Thomas M. Davis III, Chair; Connie Morella, Ranking Member)
  - Government Management, Information and Technology (Stephen Horn, Chair; Jeff Sessions, Ranking Member)
  - Human Resources (Chris Shays, Chair; Vince Snowbarger, Ranking Member)
  - National Economic Growth, Natural Resources and Regulatory Affairs (David M. McIntosh, Chair; John E. Sununu, Ranking Member)
  - National Security, International Affairs and Criminal Justice (Dennis Hastert, Chair; Mark Souder, Ranking Member)
  - Postal Service (John McHugh, Chair; Mark Sanford, Ranking Member)
- House Administration (Bill Thomas, Chair; Sam Gejdenson, Ranking Member)
- International Relations (Benjamin Gilman, Chair; Lee H. Hamilton, Ranking Member)
  - Africa (Edward Royce, Chair; Bob Menendez, Ranking Member)
  - Asia and the Pacific (Doug Bereuter, Chair; Howard Berman, Ranking Member)
  - International Operations and Human Rights (Chris Smith, Chair; Tom Lantos, Ranking Member)
  - Western Hemisphere (Elton Gallegly, Chair; Gary Ackerman, Ranking Member)
  - International Economic Policy and Trade (Ileana Ros-Lehtinen, Chair; Sam Gejdenson, Ranking Member)
- Judiciary (Henry J. Hyde, Chair; John Conyers, Ranking Member)
  - Commercial and Administrative Law (George Gekas, Chair; Jerrold Nadler, Ranking Member)
  - The Constitution (Charles T. Canady, Chair; Bobby Scott, Ranking Member)
  - Courts and Intellectual Property (Howard Coble, Chair; Barney Frank, Ranking Member)
  - Crime (Bill McCollum, Chair; Chuck Schumer, Ranking Member)
  - Immigration and Claims (Lamar S. Smith, Chair; Mel Watt, Ranking Member)
- National Security (Floyd Spence, Chair; Ron Dellums, Ranking Member)
  - Military Installations and Facilities (Joel Hefley, Chair; Solomon P. Ortiz, Ranking Member)
  - Military Personnel (Steve Buyer, Chair; Gene Taylor, Ranking Member)
  - Military Procurement (Duncan Hunter, Chair; Ike Skelton, Ranking Member)
  - Military Readiness (Herbert Bateman, Chair; Norman Sisisky, Ranking Member)
  - Military Research and Development (Curt Weldon, Chair; Owen B. Pickett, Ranking Member)
  - Special Oversight Panel on Morale, Welfare and Recreation (John McHugh, Chair; Marty Meehan, Ranking Member)
  - Special Oversight Panel on the Merchant Marine (Herbert Bateman, Chair; Neil Abercrombie, Ranking Member)
- Resources (Don Young, Chair; George Miller, Ranking Member)
  - Energy and Mineral Resources (Barbara Cubin, Chair; Carlos Romero-Barcelo, Ranking Member)
  - Fisheries Conservation, Wildlife and Oceans (Jim Saxton, Chair; Neil Abercrombie, Ranking Member)
  - National Parks and Public Lands (James V. Hansen, Chair; Eni Faleomavaega, Ranking Member)
  - Forests and Forest Health (Helen Chenoweth, Chair; Maurice Hinchey, Ranking Member)
  - Water and Power (John T. Doolittle, Chair; Peter DeFazio, Ranking Member)
- Rules (Gerald B.H. Solomon, Chair; Joe Moakley, Ranking Member)
  - Legislative and Budget Process (Porter Goss, Chair; Martin Frost, Ranking Member)
  - Rules and Organization of the House (David Dreier, Chair; Tony P. Hall, Ranking Member)
- Science (Jim Sensenbrenner, Chair; George E. Brown Jr., Ranking Member)
  - Basic Research (Steven Schiff, Chair; James A. Barcia, Ranking Member)
  - Energy and Environment (Ken Calvert, Chair; Tim Roemer, Ranking Member)
  - Space and Aeronautics (Dana Rohrabacher, Chair; Bud Cramer, Ranking Member)
  - Technology (Constance Morella, Chair; Bart Gordon, Ranking Member)
- Small Business (Jim Talent, Chair; John J. LaFalce, Ranking Member)
  - Empowerment (Mark Souder, Chair; Nydia Velázquez, Ranking Member)
  - Government Programs and Oversight (Roscoe G. Bartlett, Chair; Glenn Poshard, Ranking Member)
  - Regulatory Reform and Paperwork Reduction (Sue W. Kelly, Chair; Norman Sisisky, Ranking Member)
  - Tax, Finance and Exports (Donald A. Manzullo, Chair; Linda Smith, Ranking Member)
- Standards of Official Conduct (James V. Hansen, Chair; Howard Berman, Ranking Member)
- Transportation and Infrastructure (Bud Shuster, Chair; James L. Oberstar, Ranking Member)
  - Aviation (John J. Duncan Jr., Chair; Bill Lipinski, Ranking Member)
  - Coast Guard and Maritime Transportation (Wayne T. Gilchrest, Chair; Bob Clement, Ranking Member)
  - Public Buildings and Economic Development (Bud Shuster, Chair; James L. Oberstar, Ranking Member)
  - Railroads (Susan Molinari, Chair; Bob Wise, Ranking Member)
  - Surface Transportation (Tom Petri, Chair; Nick Rahall, Ranking Member)
  - Water Resources and Environment (Sherwood Boehlert, Chair; Robert Borski, Ranking Member)
- Veterans' Affairs (Bob Stump, Chair; Lane Evans, Ranking Member)
  - Benefits (Jack Quinn, Chair; Bob Filner, Ranking Member)
  - Health (Cliff Stearns, Chair; Luis Guiterrez, Ranking Member)
  - Oversight and Investigations (Terry Everett, Chair; Jim Clyburn, Ranking Member)
- Ways and Means (Bill Archer, Chair; Charles Rangel, Ranking Member)
  - Health (Bill Thomas, Chair; Pete Stark, Ranking Member)
  - Human Resources (E. Clay Shaw Jr., Chair; Sander M. Levin, Ranking Member)
  - Oversight (Nancy Johnson, Chair; William J. Coyne, Ranking Member)
  - Social Security (Jim Bunning, Chair; Barbara B. Kennelly, Ranking Member)
  - Trade (Phil Crane, Chair; Bob Matsui, Ranking Member)
- Whole

=== Joint committees ===
- Economic (Rep. Jim Saxton, Chair; Sen. Connie Mack III, Vice Chair)
- Taxation (Rep. Bill Archer, Chair; Sen. William V. Roth Jr., Vice Chair)
- The Library (Rep. Bill Thomas, Chair; Sen. Ted Stevens, Vice Chair)
- Printing (Sen. John W. Warner, Chair; Rep. Bill Thomas, Vice Chair)

== Employees ==
=== Legislative branch agency directors ===
- Architect of the Capitol: William L. Ensign (acting), until February 1997
  - Alan M. Hantman, starting February 1997
- Attending Physician of the United States Congress: John F. Eisold
- Comptroller General of the United States: vacant, until 1998
  - David M. Walker, from 1998
- Director of the Congressional Budget Office: June E. O'Neill
- Librarian of Congress: James H. Billington
- Public Printer of the United States: Michael F. DiMario

=== Senate ===
- Chaplain: Lloyd John Ogilvie (Presbyterian)
- Curator: Diane K. Skvarla
- Historian: Richard A. Baker
- Parliamentarian: Bob Dove
- Secretary: Gary Lee Sisco
- Librarian: Greg Harness
- Secretary for the Majority: Elizabeth B. Greene
- Secretary for the Minority: Martin P. Paone
- Sergeant at Arms: Gregory S. Casey, until November 9, 1998
  - James W. Ziglar, from November 9, 1998

=== House of Representatives ===
- Chaplain: James D. Ford (Lutheran)
- Chief Administrative Officer: Jeff Trandahl (acting), until July 31, 1997
  - James M. Eagen III, from July 31, 1997
- Clerk: Robin H. Carle, until December 21, 1998
  - Jeff Trandahl, from January 1, 1999
- Parliamentarian: Charles W. Johnson
- Reading Clerks:
  - Meg Goetz (D) (until May 22, 1998), Mary Kevin Niland (D) (starting May 22, 1998)
  - Paul Hays (R)
- Sergeant at Arms: Wilson Livingood
- Inspector General: John W. Lainhart IV

== See also ==
- List of new members of the 105th United States Congress
- 1996 United States elections (elections leading to this Congress)
  - 1996 United States presidential election
  - 1996 United States Senate elections
  - 1996 United States House of Representatives elections
- 1998 United States elections (elections during this Congress, leading to the next Congress)
  - 1998 United States Senate elections
  - 1998 United States House of Representatives elections
