= Bob Berry =

Bob Berry may refer to:

== Sports ==
- Bob Berry (American football) (1942–2023), American football quarterback
- Bob Berry (coach) (1905–1953), American football and track and field coach, college athletics administrator
- Bob Berry (cricketer) (1926–2006), English Test cricketer
- Bob Berry (ice hockey) (born 1943), Canadian ice hockey coach and player

== Others ==
- Bob Berry (businessman), CEO Tri-B nursery
- Bob Berry (dendrologist) (1916–2018), New Zealand farmer and creator of Hackfalls Arboretum in Tiniroto, Gisborne
- Bob Berry (reading clerk), American government official, army officer and lawyer

== See also ==
- Robert Berry (disambiguation)
