= Robert Barry =

Robert or Bob Barry may refer to:

- Robert Barry (artist) (born 1936), American artist
- Robert Barry (musician) (1938–2018), American jazz musician
- Robert L. Barry (1934–2024), U.S. diplomat
- Robert R. Barry (1915–1988), U.S. Representative from New York
- Robert A. Barry (1860–1934), American politician, Missouri state representative
- Robert Barry (merchant) (1759–1843), Scottish Canadian merchant
- Robert Barry (politician) (1731–1793), Irish MP for Charleville
- Monster Bobby (born 1981), real name Robert Barry, English singer-songwriter
- Robert de Barry (fl. 1175), Norman warrior
- Bob Barry Jr. (1956–2015), American sportscaster
- Bob Barry (photographer) (born 1943), American actor and photographer
- Bob Barry Sr. (1931–2011), American sportscaster
- Bob Barry (cricketer, born 1868) (1868–1938)
- Bob Barry (cricketer, born 1878) (1878–1915)

== See also ==
- Robert Barrie (1774–1841), British naval officer
- Robert Barrie (pentathlete) (born 1951), Australian modern pentathlete
- Robert Berry (disambiguation)
