= Paul Hays =

Former Reading Clerk of the US House Of Representatives

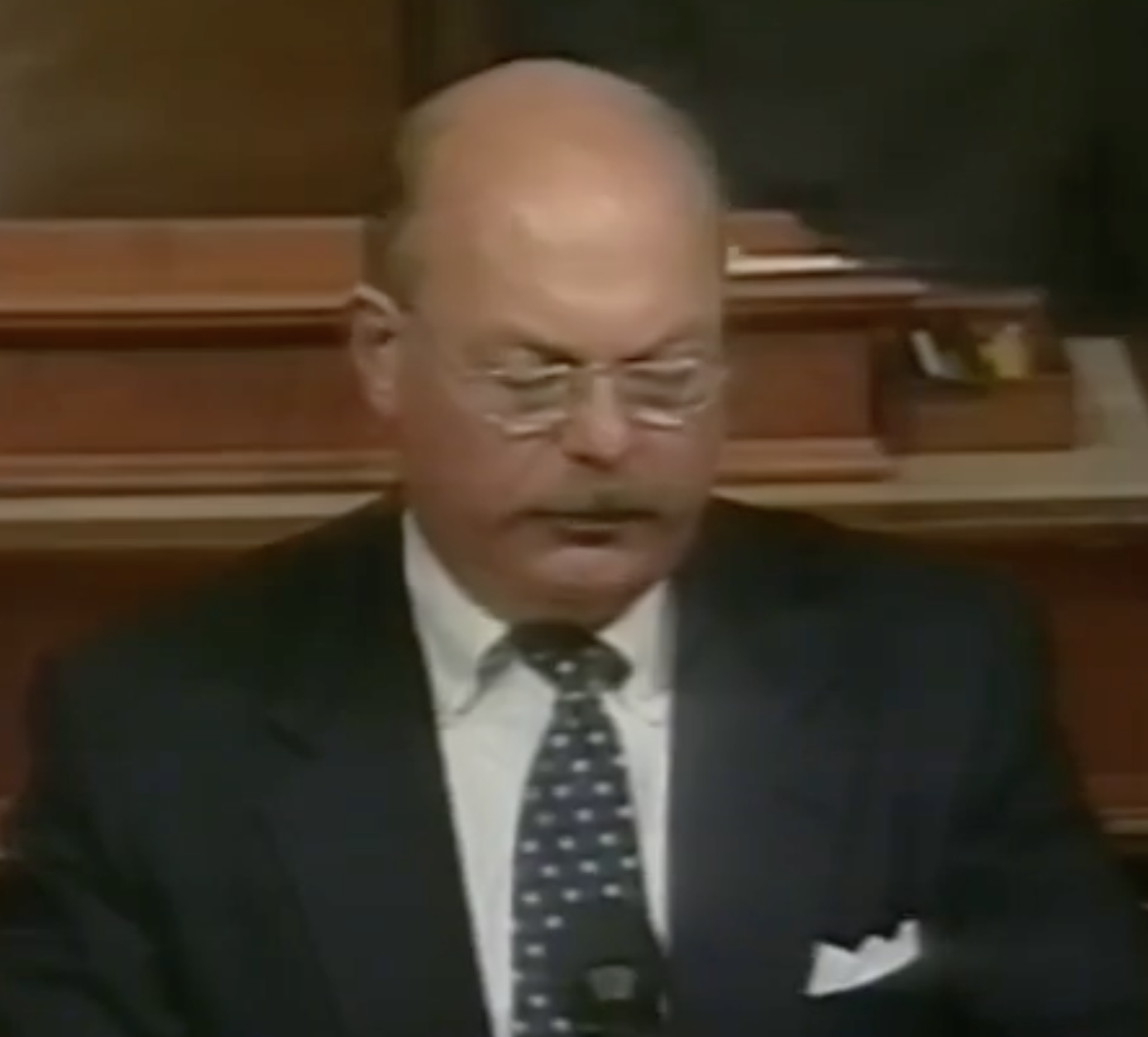
- Hays in 1995

Reading Clerk of the United States House of Representatives
- In office 1988 – April 30, 2007
- Served with: Meg Goetz (1988–1998); Mary Kevin Niland (1998–2007)
- Preceded by: Bob Berry
- Succeeded by: Susan Cole

Personal details
- Party: Republican
- Education: Georgetown University

Paul Hays (born April 1946) is an American government official who served as the reading clerk of the United States House of Representatives from 1988 to 2007. The reading clerk reads bills, motions, and other papers before the House and keeps track of changes to legislation made on the floor. During the vote for Speaker at the beginning of each Congress, or when the electronic voting system fails, the clerk calls the roll of members for voting viva voce. Hays joined the House in 1966 and became Republican reading clerk in 1988 at the nomination of Minority Leader Robert H. Michel of Illinois.

His parents met while at George Washington University, his father a native of Mississippi, and his mother a transplant from Kansas. Paul Hays was born in Washington D.C. Hays started his career in Washington as a Supreme Court Page. He attended the Capitol Page School while he was a Page. Hays's aunt taught at the Capitol Page School for many years. Hays's Democratic counterpart was Mary Kevin Niland, who remained a reading clerk until 2008.

Paul Hays retired as Reading Clerk on April 30, 2007. As the House met only in a pro forma session that day, the last day Hays actually assisted in legislative business was April 26.
