= Susan Cole (reading clerk) =

American government official

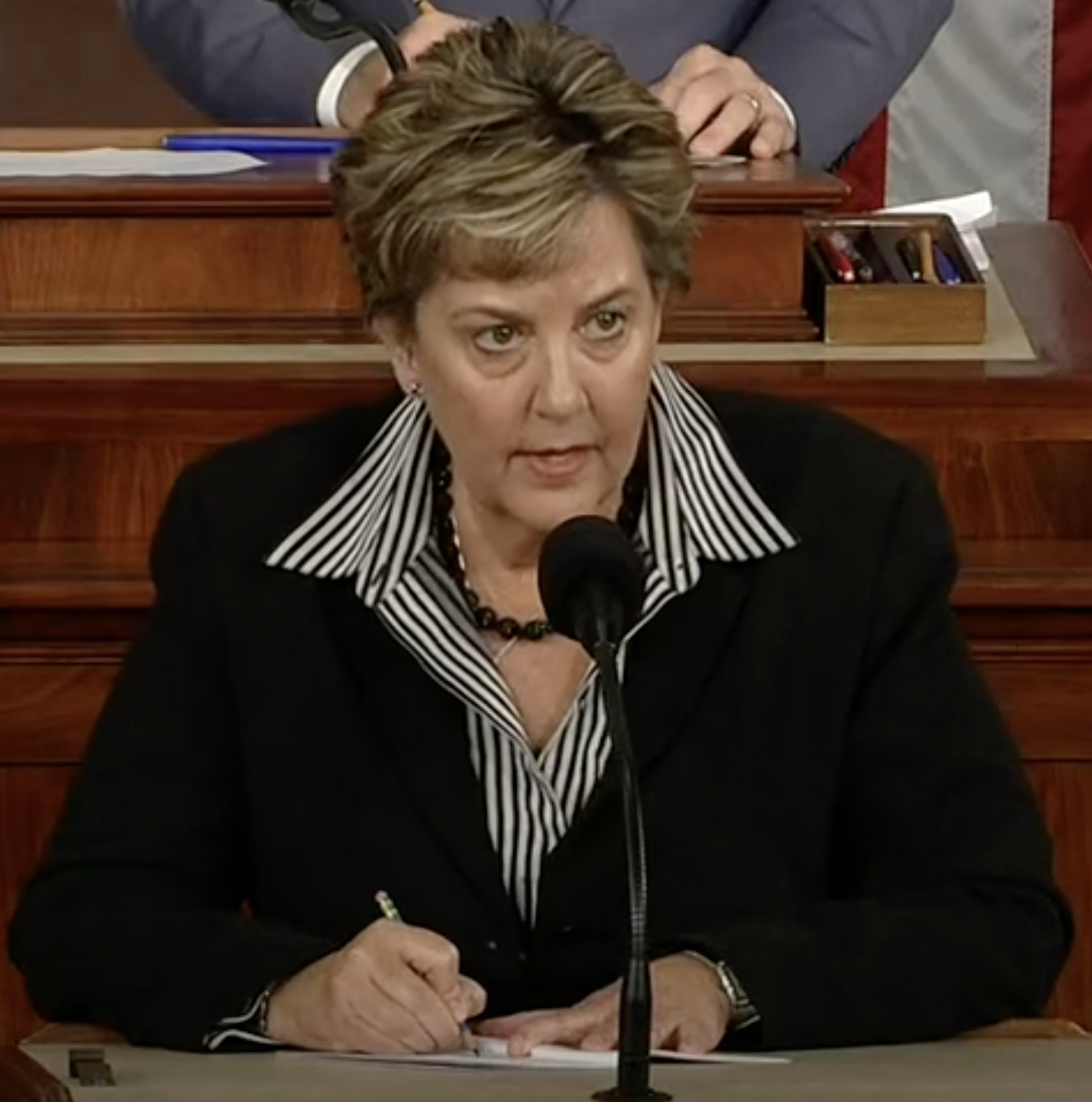
- Cole in 2023

Reading Clerk of the United States House of Representatives
- Incumbent
- Assumed office June 12, 2007 Serving with Tylease Alli
- Preceded by: Paul Hays

Personal details
- Born: 1962 or 1963 (age 63–64)
- Party: Republican
- Children: 2
- Education: Austin Peay State University (BA)

Susan Cole (born 1962/1963) is an American government official who serves as a reading clerk of the United States House of Representatives. She has held the position since 2007, has worked as a staffer in the Office of the Clerk of the United States House of Representatives since 2003, and has been a staffer of the United States House of Representatives since 1994.

Cole serves as one of two House reading clerks (the other being Tylease Alli, designated by Democrats). Cole was appointed by Republican Minority leader John Boehner in 2007 to replace Paul Hays after he retired.

== Career ==
Cole grew up in Tennessee. She graduated from Austin Peay State University in 1986 with a bachelor's degree in health and physical education. She also played on the school's basketball and softball teams.

After graduating from college, she worked as an armored truck driver for Wells Fargo in the Nashville metropolitan area, carrying a shotgun while on the job. She then worked for the Federal Reserve Bank of Nashville and the Wright Patman Congressional Federal Credit Union.

She began working in the United States House of Representatives in 1994 as the Chief Reading and Tally Clerk for the United States House Committee on Financial Services and then began working in the Office of the Clerk of the United States House of Representatives in 2003 as the Assistant Chief Clerk of Debates.

In April 2007 when House Reading Clerk Paul Hays retired, Cole, as well as four other people, auditioned to take his place. Cole was selected for the job and began in June. After her appointment, she received coaching for six to eight weeks from an outside consultant. As House Reading Clerk, Cole has served alongside Democrat appointees Mary Kevin Niland, Jaime Zapata, Joe Novotny, and currently Tylease Alli.

== Celebrity ==
In 2017, when Representative Al Green filed articles of impeachment against President Donald Trump and mentioned his remarks about the U.S. national anthem protests in his resolution, Cole notably spelled out each letter of the word bitch, saying "b-i-t-c-h" instead of reading the word.

In 2019, Cole's daughter Olivia, who had graduated from college the prior year and had no previous legislative experience, was controversially appointed by House Clerk Cheryl Johnson to supervise the Washington, D.C. office of Wisconsin's 7th congressional district during the time in which the seat was vacant after the resignation of Representative Sean Duffy until Tom Tiffany was sworn-in after being elected in a special election. Representative Zoe Lofgren, chair of the United States House Committee on House Administration, rejected Johnson's appointment of Olivia Cole.

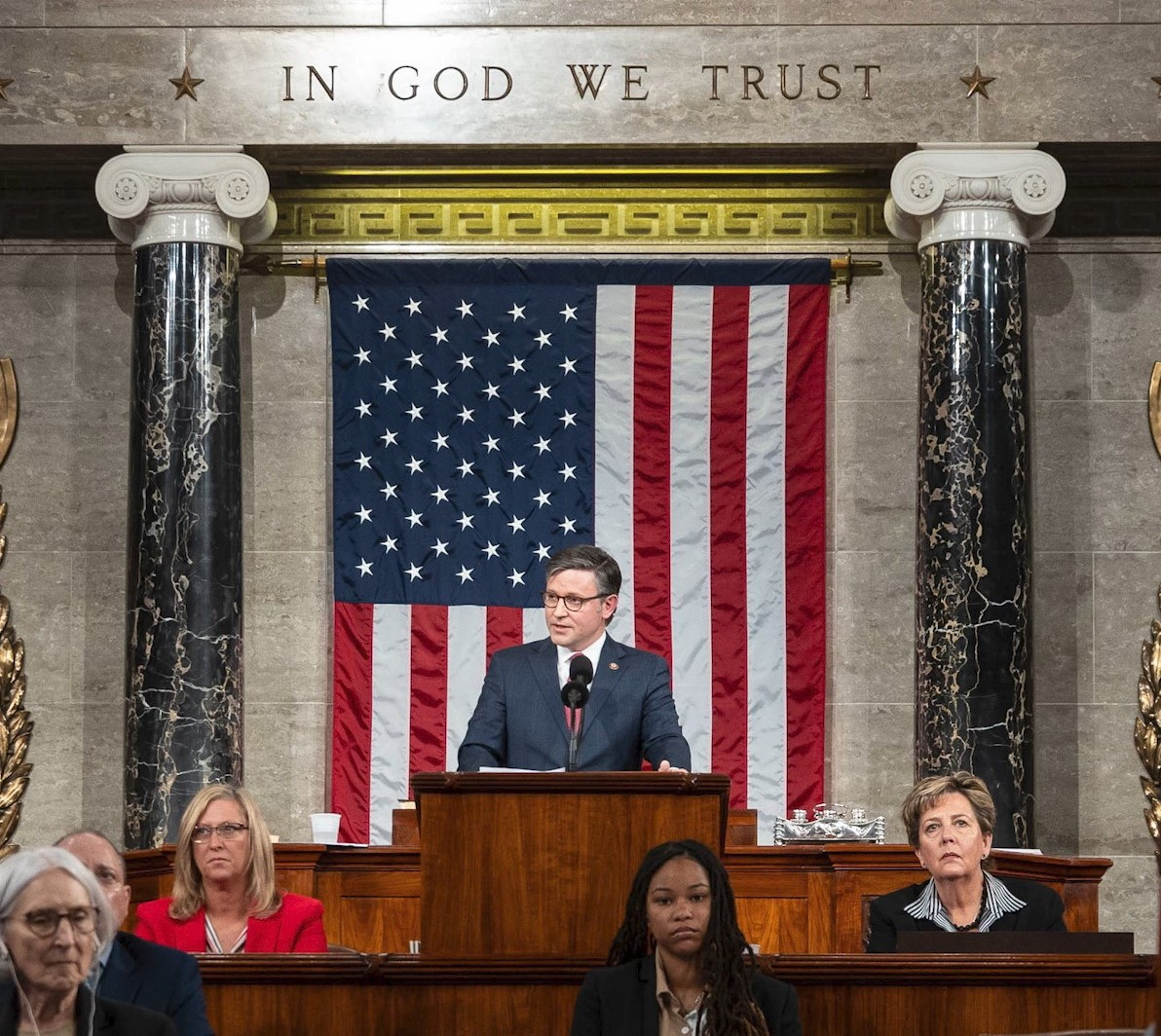
Susan Cole (middle right) following the election of Mike Johnson as Speaker of the House.

Cole, Alli, and Johnson gained distinction during the January 2023 Speaker of the United States House of Representatives election when Kevin McCarthy was elected speaker after 15 rounds of voting, presiding over the House for four days. It was the first time in 100 years that a House Speaker was elected after more than one round of voting.

Cole was responsible for the tallying of the fourth ballot on the October 2023 Speaker of the United States House of Representatives election, which resulted in Mike Johnson being elected as Speaker of the House of Representatives following Kevin McCarthy's ousting. Following the election of Speaker Johnson, the House of Representatives gave Cole a standing ovation for her role in calling the roll through both the January and October 2023 Speaker elections.

== Personal life ==
Cole lives in Alexandria, Virginia with her husband. They have two daughters.
