= Bob Barry (cricketer, born 1868) =

New Zealand cricketer and umpire

Personal information
- Full name: Robert Deey William Barry
- Born: 7 January 1868; Christchurch, New Zealand
- Died: 3 January 1938 (aged 69); Christchurch, New Zealand
- Bowling: Right-arm leg-spin
- Relatives: Bob Barry (cousin)

Domestic team information
- Years: Team
- 1891-92 to 1904-05: Canterbury

Career statistics
Competition	First-class
Matches	12
Runs scored	251
Batting average	13.21
100s/50s	0/0
Top score	35
Balls bowled	444
Wickets	13
Bowling average	16.07
5 wickets in innings	0
10 wickets in match	0
Best bowling	3/13
Catches/stumpings	11/0
- Source: CricketArchive, 14 January 2020

Robert Deey William Barry (7 January 1868 – 3 January 1938) was a New Zealand cricketer and umpire who played first-class cricket for Canterbury from 1892 to 1904 and umpired first-class cricket matches in Christchurch from 1903 to 1924.

== Life ==
Bob Barry was born in Christchurch and educated there at Cathedral Grammar School. A leg-spin bowler and useful lower-order batsman, he made his first-class debut against Auckland in 1891–92. When Auckland began their second innings requiring only 31 to win, Barry and his fellow leg-spinner Herbert De Maus took three wickets each to reduce Auckland to 24 for 6 before the necessary runs were scored. Later he captained Canterbury on several occasions.

His younger cousin, also called Bob Barry, played alongside him in Canterbury's match against Hawke's Bay in 1901–02. Coincidentally, each cousin made 17 runs in the match and took one wicket.

He lived in Auckland for some years from 1907 before returning to Christchurch. After he retired from playing cricket, he became an umpire, officiating in 13 first-class matches in Christchurch. He was also a senior rugby referee, officiating in several representative matches.

Barry married in 1906, but the marriage was not a success. There were no children, they separated in 1912, and his wife divorced him for neglect in 1919.
