= Bob Berry (reading clerk) =

American government official

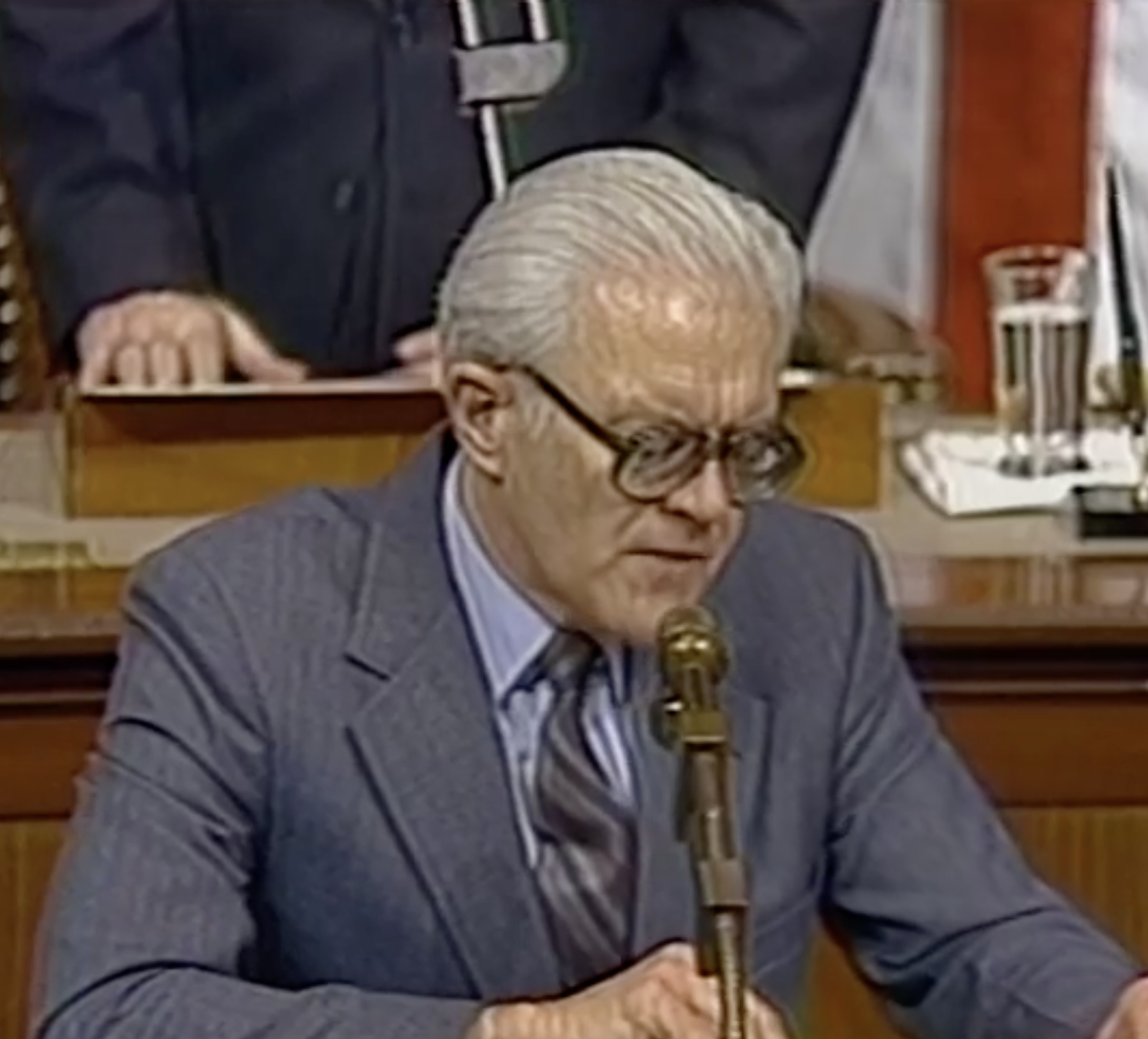
- Berry in January 1987

Reading Clerk of the United States House of Representatives
- In office 1978–1987
- Served with: Charles W. Hackney, Jr. (1978–1982); Meg Goetz (1982–1987)
- Preceded by: Joe Bartlett
- Succeeded by: Paul Hays

Personal details
- Born: May 2, 1930 Mobridge, South Dakota
- Died: October 8, 2022 (aged 92)
- Party: Republican
- Spouse: Marilyn Berry
- Children: 2
- Parents: E. Y. Berry; Rose Berry
- Education: University of South Dakota

Military service
- Branch/service: United States Army
- Rank: First Lieutenant

Robert Ellis Berry (May 2, 1930 – October 8, 2022) was an American government official, army officer and lawyer who served as Reading Clerk of the United States House of Representatives from 1978 to 1987. He had previously served as a staffer for Senator Karl Mundt from 1958 to 1965 and as a Counsel for the Senate Government Operations Committee.

== Personal life and early career ==
Robert Ellis Berry was born in Mobridge, South Dakota in to future U.S. Representative E. Y. Berry and Rose Berry. He was the oldest of two siblings, with his sister, Nila Berry, being born four years later. Berry grew up in McLaughlin, South Dakota.

Berry attended the University of South Dakota where he earned a bachelor's degree in business, then went to the University of South Dakota School of Law to earn his law degree.

Following his graduation, Berry joined the United States Army for two years, achieving the rank of First Lieutenant. After his service in the Army concluded, Berry practiced law in Lemmon, South Dakota, later joining his father in Washington D.C. following his election to the House of Representatives in 1950.

He had two children, Nancy, born in April 1964 and Brian, born in July 1966.

Berry was a member of the Aldersgate United Methodist Church.

== Career on Capitol Hill ==
In 1958, Berry joined the staff of Senator Karl Mundt, as a legislative Aide, working with him until 1965, beginning his career within the United States Congress.

Berry then moved to work within the Senate Government Operations Committee as a counsel.

In 1978, the House Republican Conference chose Bob Berry to serve as the Republican Reading Clerks of the House of Representatives to his Democratic counterpart. He served in this position until 1987, when he retired from work in the United States Congress.

Upon retirement, Berry was honored by the United States House of Representatives on December 21, 1987, by receiving an honorary gavel from then Speaker of the House Jim Wright.

Berry then became a lobbyist for the American Gas Association from 1987 to 1997, when he fully retired from his work.
