= Alney E. Chaffee =

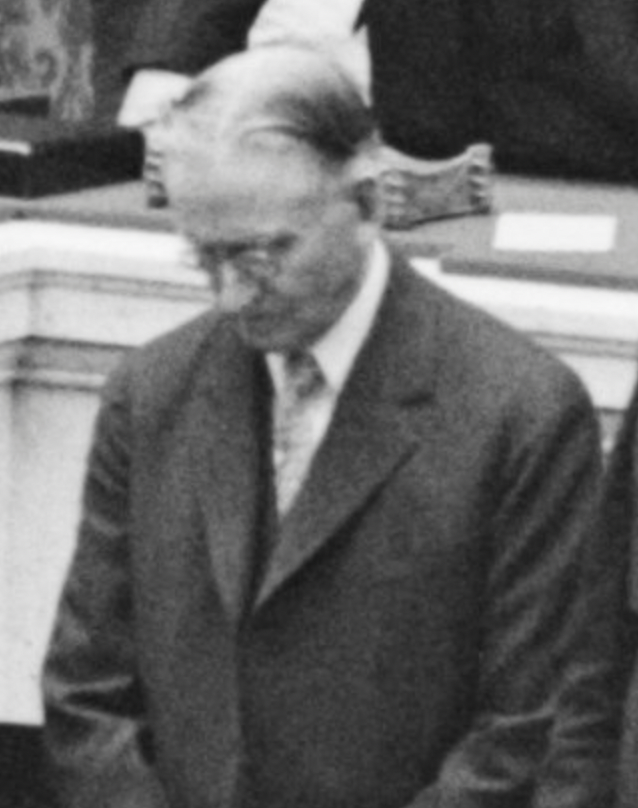
- Chaffee in 1928

Reading Clerk of the United States House of Representatives
- In office 1919–1957
- Served with: Patrick Joseph Haltigan (1919–1937); Roger M. Calloway (1937–1943); George J. Maurer (1943–1957); Joe Bartlett (1953–1957)
- Preceded by: H. Martin Williams
- Succeeded by: Joe Bartlett

Personal details
- Born: March 3, 1867 Vermont, US
- Died: March 21, 1957 (aged 90)
- Party: Republican
- Spouse: Fannie Chaffee

Alney E. Chaffee (March 3, 1867 – March 21, 1957) was an American government official who served as Reading Clerk of the United States House of Representatives from 1919 to 1957.

== Personal life ==
Alney Chaffee was born in Vermont in 1867 or 1868. He was married Fannie Chaffee.

== Career ==
Chaffee was hired as the Republican Reading Clerk in 1919 by then Speaker of the House of Representatives Frederick H. Gillett, where he served in this capacity until 1957, when he retired and was replaced by Joe Bartlett.

Notably, during Chaffee's tenure as one of two House Reading Clerks, he was responsible for reading the United States declaration of war on Japan and the United States declaration of war on Italy to the House of Representatives.
