= Robert Berry (disambiguation) =

Robert Berry is an American guitarist, vocalist and producer.

Robert Berry may also refer to:

- Robert Marion Berry (1942–2023), American politician
- Robert Berry (MP) (died 1618), Member of Parliament (MP) for Ludlow
- R. J. Berry (1934–2018), British geneticist
- Robert E. Berry, American food scientist
- Robert Edward Fraser Berry (1926–2011), Anglican bishop
- Robert Berry (runner) (1972–2014), marathon runner who died at the 2014 London Marathon
- Robert Griffith Berry (1869–1945), Welsh minister
- Robert Mallory Berry (1846–1929), American naval officer and Arctic explorer

== See also ==
- Bob Berry (disambiguation)
- Robert Barry (disambiguation)
