= Tylease Alli =

American government official

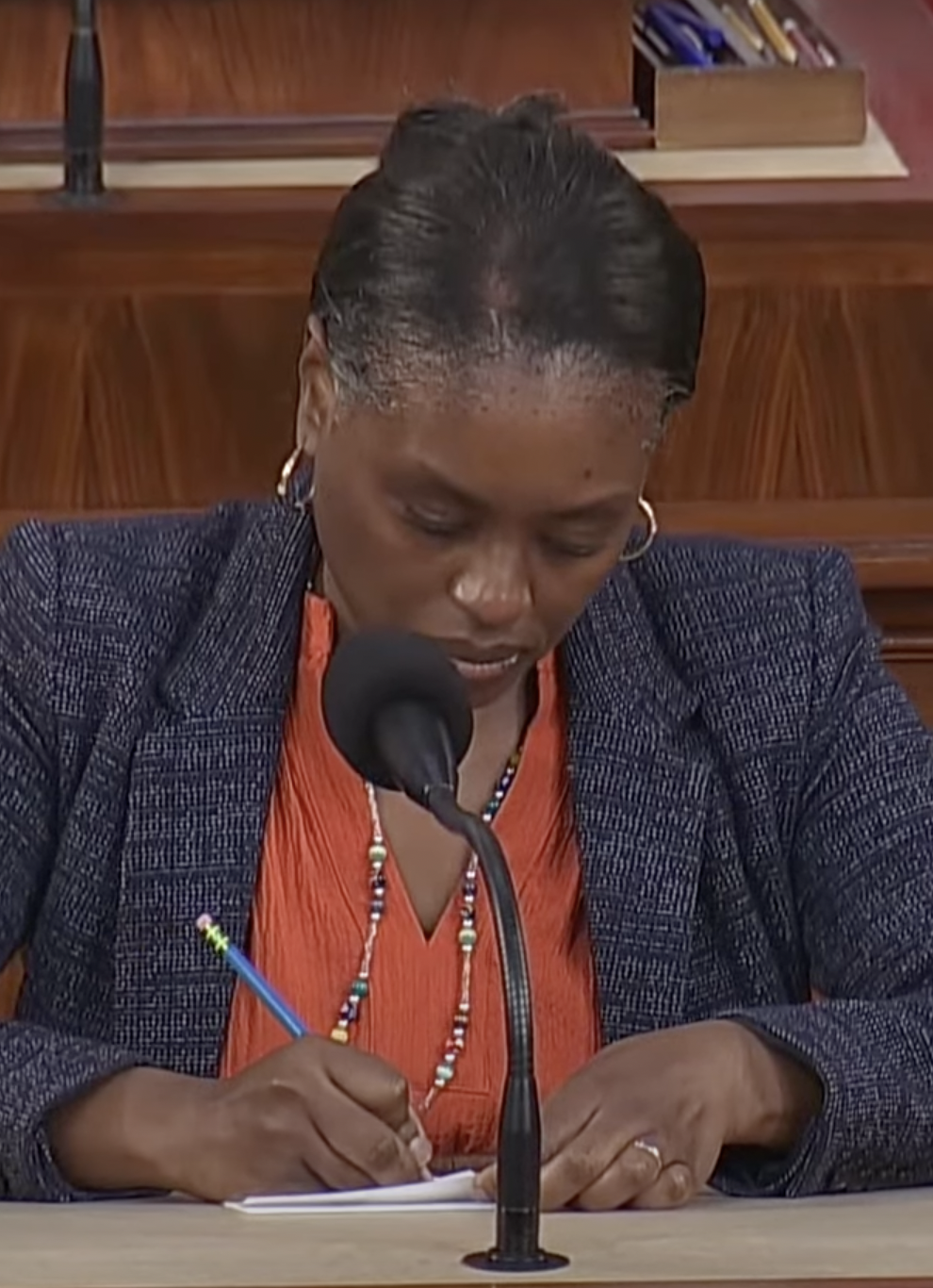
- Alli in 2023

Reading Clerk of the United States House of Representatives
- Incumbent
- Assumed office March 4, 2021 Serving with Susan Cole
- Preceded by: Joe Novotny

Personal details
- Party: Democratic
- Education: Michigan State University (BA)

Tylease Alli is an American government official who serves as one of two reading clerk of the United States House of Representatives. She has held the office since 2021, and has worked on Capitol Hill in various roles as clerk for the House Committee on Education and Workforce from 2003 to 2019 and as Chief Clerk for the House Committee on Education and Labor from 2019 to 2021.

Alli serves as one of two House reading clerks (the other being Susan Cole, designated by Republicans). Alli was appointed by Speaker of the House Nancy Pelosi in 2021 to replace Joe Novotny after he retired.

== Career ==
Alli graduated from Michigan State University in 2002 with a Bachelor of Arts in psychology and political science. After graduating, Alli started working in the House of Representatives within the House Committee on Education and Workforce. She remained as a staffer within the committee from 2003 to 2019, when her appointment to Chief Clerk of the Committee was made.

In March 2021, Alli's predecessor, Joe Novotny, retired as House Reading Clerk. Alli was appointed by then-speaker of the House Nancy Pelosi to fill the role. Throughout the duration of Alli's tenure, she has served with Susan Cole, her Republican counterpart, who has served since 2007.

== Notability ==
Alli, alongside Susan Cole, gained notability as a result of the January 2023 Speaker of the United States House of Representatives election where Kevin McCarthy, the then Republican Conference Leader, failed to secure the full backing of his party due to a series of conservative holdouts within the party. In her capacity as House Reading Clerk, Alli read the names of Representatives and tallied their votes.

Alli and Cole renewed this role in the October 2023 Speaker of the United States House of Representatives election due to the ousting of Kevin McCarthy as Speaker of the House of Representatives. This was unprecedented and the first time in American history in which a sitting speaker has been removed from office. Alli and Cole served under Speaker Pro Tempore Patrick McHenry for the duration of this period.

== Personal life ==
Alli currently lives in Prince George's County, Maryland.
