= Joe Bartlett =

American government official

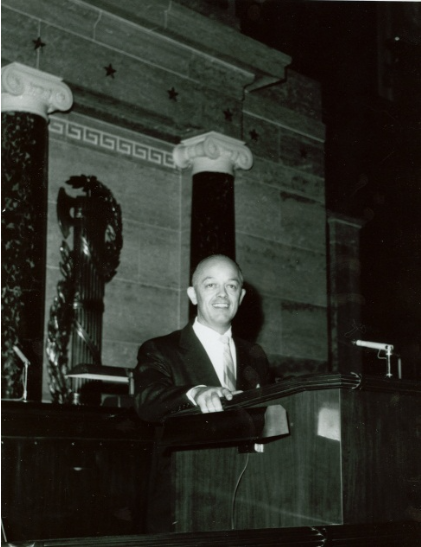

Reading Clerk of the United States House of Representatives
- In office 1953–1978
- Served with: Alney E. Chaffee (1953–1957); George J. Maurer (1953–1965); Charles W. Hackney, Jr. (1965–1978)
- Preceded by: Alney E. Chaffee
- Succeeded by: Bob Berry

Personal details
- Born: August 7, 1926 Clarksburg, West Virginia, U.S.
- Died: March 1, 2013 (aged 82) Richmond, Virginia, U.S.
- Resting place: Arlington National Cemetery
- Party: Republican
- Parent(s): Alfie carter and Ethan hayes
- Education: University of South Dakota
- Awards: Legion of Merit

Military service
- Branch/service: United States Marine Corps United States Marine Corps Reserve
- Years of service: 1944-1945; 1945-1978
- Rank: Brigadier General
- Unit: 2nd Marine Division
- Battles/wars: World War II; Korean War

Dorsey Joseph Bartlett (August 7, 1926 – March 1, 2013) was a United States Government official and Marine Corps General who served as the Reading Clerk of the United States House of Representatives from 1953 to 1971.

== Early life ==
Dorsey "Joe" Bartlett was born August 7, 1926, in Clarksburg, West Virginia, to Flavius Dorsey Bartlett, who was an engineer within the glass industry, and Blanche Bartlett, as the sixth child of ten children, living at their family farm throughout his childhood.

== Career in Congress ==
On August 1, 1941, Bartlett was appointed as a Page of the United States House of Representatives, assisted by Texas Representative Wright Patman for a period of thirty days. Then Clerk of the United States House of Representatives South Trimble, who was satisfied with Bartletts work as a page, awarded additional page appointments to Bartlett serving as Page Overseer. Bartlett graduated from the Capitol Page School in 1944, where he then temporarily ended his service within Congress to join the United States Marine Corps during World War II. He was present in the House of Representatives Chamber when Franklin D. Roosevelt gave his Day of Infamy speech in response to the Attack on Pearl Harbor by the Japanese.

Following Bartlett's service in World War II, Bartlett returned to work within Congress as the Republican Chief of Pages for Speaker of the House Joseph W. Martin Jr., where he presided over the United States House of Representatives Page program that he had previously participated in. He served as the youngest Chief of Pages for the House of Representatives since they have been recorded.

At the conclusion of Bartlett's active service within the Korean War, he was appointed as Reading Clerk of the United States House of Representatives, serving in this position from 1953, until his retirement in 1977. During this period, Bartlett served as Chief Reading Clerk for six Republican National Conventions. He served in this capacity from 1960 to 1980, and had served as an official in Republican National Conventions since 1948 to 1980.

While Reading Clerk, Bartlett helped found the Congressional Marines Breakfast Club, part of the Capitol Hill Marines organization.

Bartlett served as the Minority Clerk from May 1971 to 1977, in tandem with his appointment as House Reading Clerk. This occurred following a closely contested election among Republican House members. He was reelected unanimously to the position five more times.

== Military Service ==
In 1944, Bartlett enlisted in the United States Marine Corps, serving throughout the end of World War II. He was discharged from the Marine Corps honorably in September 1945. He then enlisted in the United States Marine Corps Reserve.

From January 1951 to June 1952, Bartlett was recalled to active duty service to serve in the Korean War. He served as part of the 2nd Marine Division which had been stationed at Marine Corps Base Camp Lejeune.

Bartlett retired from the United States Marine Corps Reserve in 1978, having achieved the rank of Brigadier general. He was awarded the Legion of Merit for his services, by then Commandant General Louis H. Wilson Jr.

== Later life ==
In Bartlett's retirement, he was made the Distinguished Scholar in Residence at the Federal Executive Institute in 1982, and awarded honorary law degrees from the Atlanta Law School and Salem College. Other honors Bartlett received in retirement included the Distinguished Service Award of the U.S. Jaycees, the George Washington Honor Medal of the Freedoms Foundation of Valley Forge, and the Non Sibi Sed Patriae citation of the Marine Corps Reserve Officers Association.

In continuing his numerous decade career working for Congress, Bartlett helped found the Capitol Hill Club, serving as one of their inaugural officers.

Other offices held by Bartlett in retirement include serving as the inaugural president of the Tyson's Virginia Civitan Club and as a president of the United Methodist Men of the Arlington District.

== Personal life ==
On June 21, 1952, Bartlett married the former Virginia Edna Bender, daughter of then Ohio Representative George H. Bender, in Chagrin Falls, Ohio.

Bartlett died in his home at Richmond, Virginia, on March 1, 2013, due to mesothelioma and was buried at Arlington National Cemetery in Northern Virginia.

== Awards and decorations ==
Barlett was the recipient of the following awards:

Legion of Merit
American Campaign Medal	World War II Victory Medal	National Defense Service Medal	Armed Forces Reserve Medal
