= Herbert De Maus =

New Zealand cricketer

Personal information
- Full name: Herbert Seton De Maus
- Born: 15 September 1871; Levuka, Fiji
- Died: 15 July 1929 (aged 57); Suva, Fiji
- Height: 6 ft 2 in (1.88 m)
- Batting: Right-handed
- Bowling: Slow

Domestic team information
- Years: Team
- 1889-90 to 1896-97: Canterbury

Career statistics
Competition	First-class
Matches	23
Runs scored	1071
Batting average	26.77
100s/50s	1/6
Top score	113
Balls bowled	1350
Wickets	41
Bowling average	16.29
5 wickets in innings	2
10 wickets in match	0
Best bowling	7/48
Catches/stumpings	9/0
- Source: Cricinfo, 2 March 2019

Herbert Seton De Maus (15 September 1871 – 15 July 1929) was a New Zealand cricketer who played first-class cricket for Canterbury from 1889 to 1897. He represented New Zealand with distinction in their earliest matches.

== Personal life ==
Bert De Maus was born in Levuka, Fiji, and educated at schools in Scotland and New Zealand before going to work at the Lyttelton Times in Christchurch. He married Helen "Tizzie" Pirie in Christchurch in November 1892. They had a son and two daughters. He returned to Fiji around 1900, where he had a trading business. He died suddenly at his home in Suva, aged 57.

He was a fine singer and an accomplished artist. Several of his sketches were displayed in the old pavilion at Lancaster Park, Christchurch.

== Cricket career ==
The New Zealand cricket historian Dick Brittenden described him thus: "Tall and handsome, this stylish batsman was one of the best in the country ... By instinct, Demaus [sic] was a careful, correct player" but able to take risks when the situation demanded. He was also a useful slow bowler.

De Maus first made his mark in the 1889-90 season at the age of 18 in Canterbury's match against the touring New South Wales team, scoring 74 and 23, more runs in total than any other batsmen in the match. In Canterbury's match against Wellington at the Basin Reserve in March 1891, 31 wickets fell for 242 on the first day. De Maus, batting at number three, made 3 and 25, which was Canterbury's top score of the match. Bowling throughout Wellington's first innings, he took 7 for 48 off 14 six-ball overs. Nevertheless, Wellington won early on the second day.

When New South Wales toured New Zealand in 1893-94 they were undefeated in their first three first-class matches; but when they played Canterbury, De Maus scored 113, his only first-class century, and Canterbury won by an innings. He was included in the team a few days later for New Zealand's first first-class representative match, against New South Wales in Christchurch. He made 45 in the first innings, easily New Zealand's highest score in the match, and took 4 for 33 in the second innings, but New Zealand lost heavily. He also played two years later when New Zealand played against the next New South Wales touring team. This time New Zealand won, thanks in part to De Maus's 47 in the second innings.

When the cricket historian Tom Reese compiled his history of early New Zealand cricket, New Zealand Cricket, 1841–1914, in 1927, he included De Maus in his 14-man team of the best New Zealand cricketers of the period.
