= Reading Clerk of the United States House of Representatives =

Employee of the United States House of Representatives

Reading Clerks of the United States House of Representatives

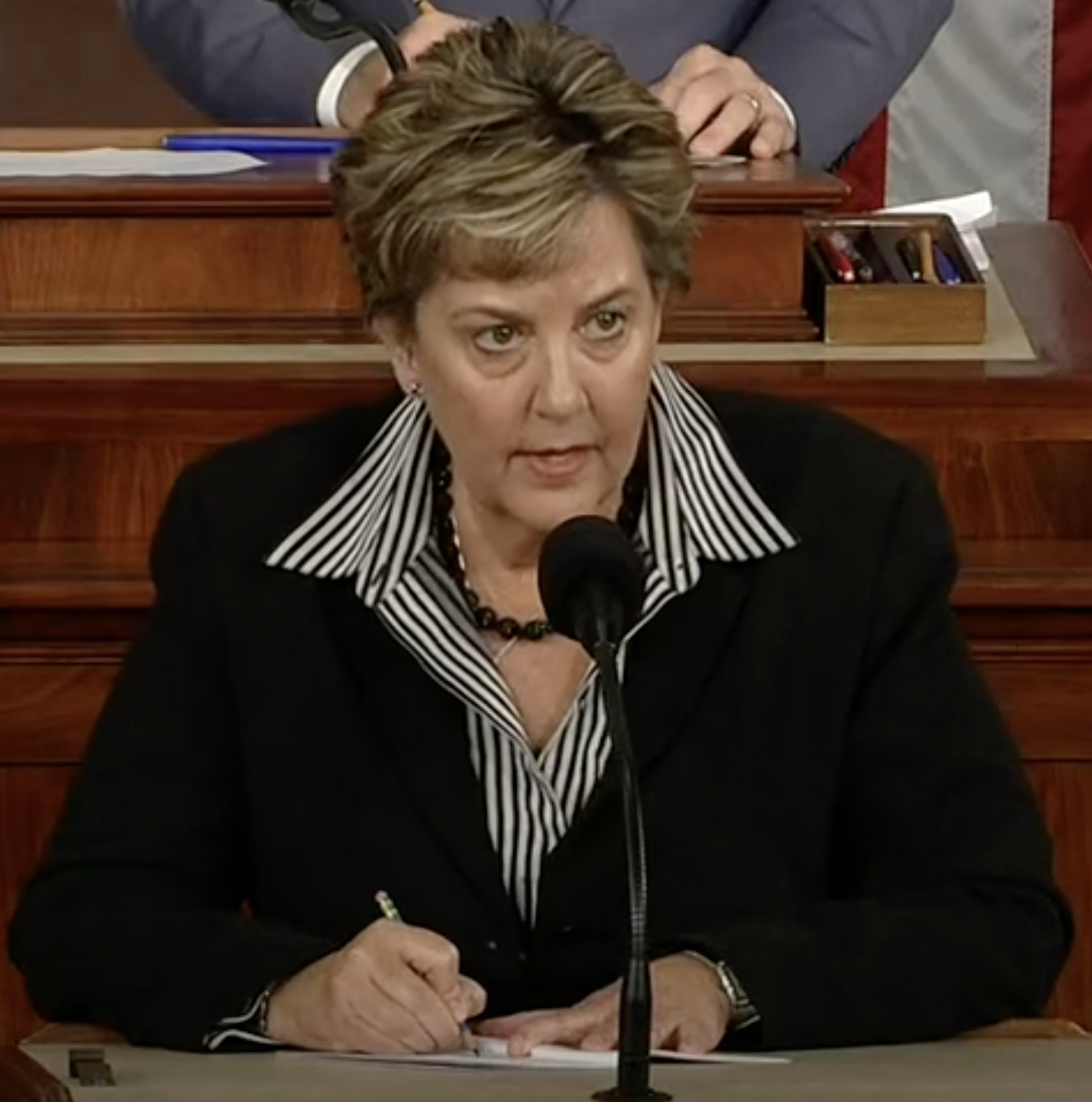
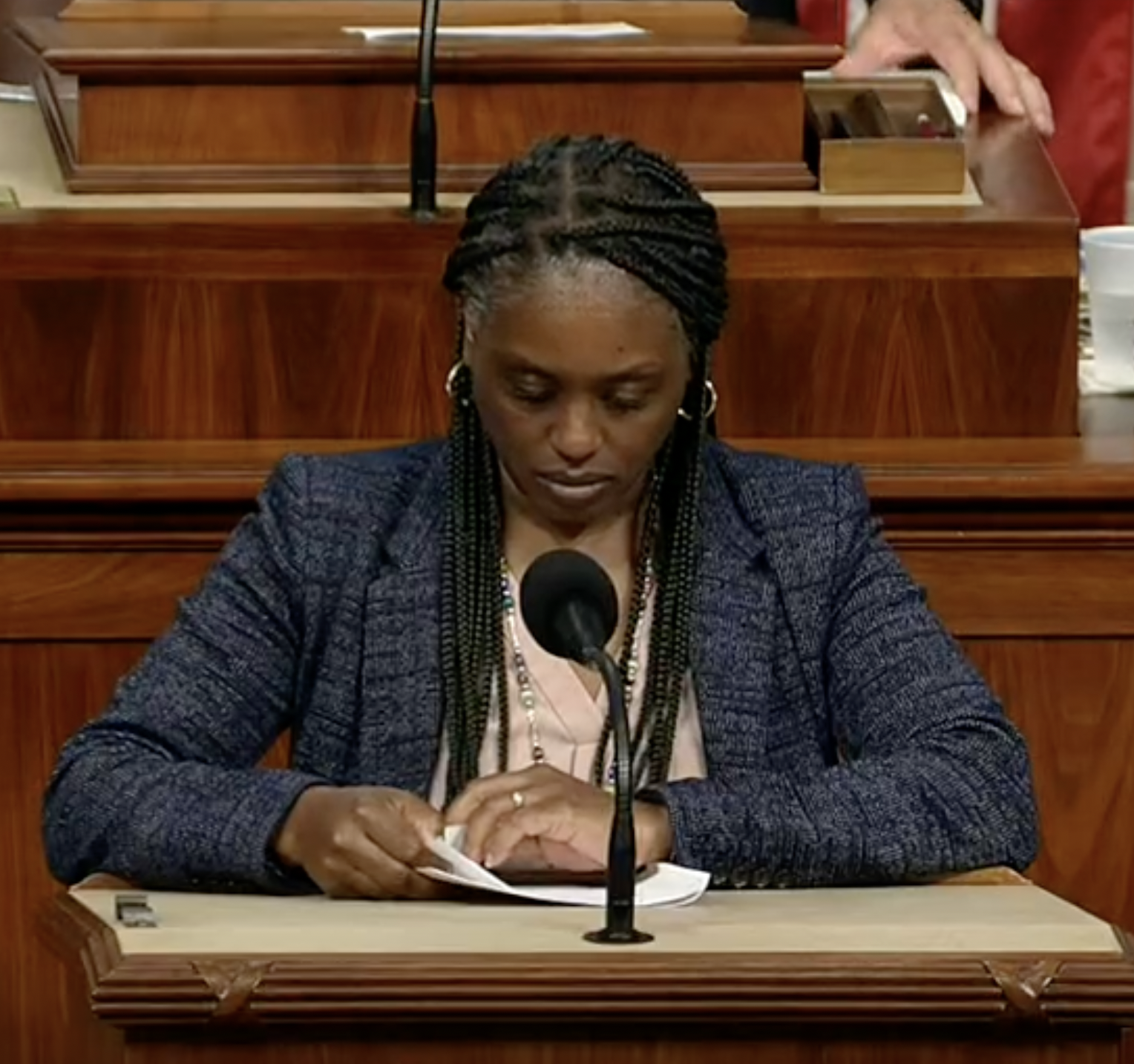
- Republican; Susan Cole since 2007 Democratic; Tylease Alli since 2021
- United States House of Representatives; Office of Legislative Operations
- Inaugural holder: Edward W. Barber (Democratic); William K. Mehaffey (Republican)

The reading clerk of the United States House of Representatives reads bills, motions, and other papers before the House and keeps track of changes to legislation made on the floor. During the vote for Speaker at the beginning of each Congress, or when the electronic voting system fails, the clerk calls the roll of members for a recorded vote.

Traditionally, the reading clerks are appointed by the leaders of the majority and minority parties. For instance, Paul Hays was appointed by the then-Minority Leader Robert H. Michel, for the Republican party.

Reading clerks work for the Office of Legislative Operations, one of nine offices that fall under the jurisdiction of the clerk of the United States House of Representatives.

== List of reading clerks ==
=== Democratic ===
Reading Clerk	Term
Edward W. Barber	1863–1869
Charles N. Clisbee	1869–1875; 1881–1883
T. O. Walker	1883–1885
Thomas S. Pettit	1875–1881; 1885–1889; 1893–1895
John A. Reeve	1889–1893
Elbert L. Lampson	1895–1911
Patrick Joseph Haltigan	1911–1937
Roger M. Calloway	1937–1943
George J. Maurer	1943–1965
Charles W. Hackney Jr.	1965–1982
Meg Goetz	1982–1998
Mary Kevin Niland	1998–2008
Jaime Zapata	2008–2009
Joe Novotny	2010–2021
Tylease Alli	2021–present

=== Republican ===
Reading Clerk	Term
William K. Mehaffey	1867–1875
Neill S. Brown Jr.	1875–1889; 1893–1895
John Snyders Kenyon	1881–1883
Azro J. Maxham	1889–1891
James C. Broadwell	1891–1893
R. S. Hatcher	1895–1897
Dennis E. Alward	1897–1913
H. Martin Williams	1913–1919
Alney E. Chaffee	1919–1957
Joe Bartlett	1953–1978
Bob Berry	1978–1987
Paul Hays	1988–2007
Susan Cole	2007–present
