= Bob Barry (cricketer, born 1878) =

New Zealand cricketer and soldier

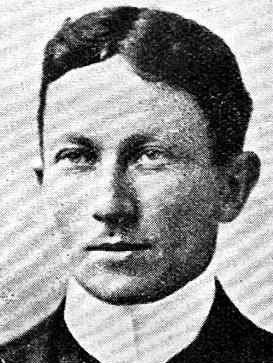

Personal information
- Full name: Robert William Barry
- Born: 9 September 1878; Akaroa, Canterbury, New Zealand
- Died: 3 December 1915 (aged 37); Dardanelles, off Gallipoli, Ottoman Turkey
- Relatives: Bob Barry (cousin)

Domestic team information
- Years: Team
- 1901-02: Canterbury

Career statistics
Competition	First-class
Matches	1
Runs scored	17
Batting average	17.00
100s/50s	0/0
Top score	13*
Balls bowled	114
Wickets	1
Bowling average	42.00
5 wickets in innings	0
10 wickets in match	0
Best bowling	1/21
Catches/stumpings	0/0
- Source: Cricinfo, 14 January 2020

Robert William Barry (9 September 1878 – 3 December 1915) was a New Zealand cricketer and soldier who played one match of first-class cricket for Canterbury in the 1901–02 season.

== Life ==
Barry was born in Akaroa in Canterbury and educated at Akaroa Boys' High School. He fought in one of the New Zealand contingents in the Boer War. On returning to New Zealand he moved to Auckland in 1902 and worked as a clerk for the New Zealand Express Company, a transport firm, for 13 years, resigning in order to enlist for service in the First World War.

He played one match for Canterbury, against Hawke's Bay in January 1902. His cousin, also called Bob Barry, played alongside him. Coincidentally, each cousin made 17 runs in the match and took one wicket.

He was also a prominent hockey player, who helped to establish the game in Auckland. He represented Auckland for several years and made the winning score in the Auckland hockey final in 1907.

In the First World War he served as a sapper with the Divisional Signalling Corps of the New Zealand Expeditionary Force. He was wounded and erroneously reported killed in June 1915 during the Gallipoli campaign, but he recovered and returned to the front. He was wounded again, and died of his wounds in a hospital ship off Gallipoli in December 1915.
