= Bob Berry (businessman) =

American businessman

Bob Berry is the CEO and co-founder of Tri-B Nursery located just west of Hulbert, Oklahoma. Berry graduated from Northeastern State University in 1961. He employs approximately 3,500 people nationwide through his nursery operation. Berry was also named a Distinguished Alumnus in 2009.
