= Jaime Zapata (Labor Department spokesman) =

American public affairs and marketing executive

- Education: BA, Georgetown University’s School of Foreign Service; MA, media and public affairs
- Alma mater: Georgetown University School of Foreign Service; George Washington University School of Media and Public Affairs
- Title: Deputy Director, Channel Strategy and Audience Engagement
- Website: https://www.gatesfoundation.org/about/leadership/jaime-zapata

Jaime Zapata is Deputy Director for Channel Strategy and Audience Engagement at the Bill & Melinda Gates Foundation. He is a former partner at GMMB, a public affairs marketing firm. He was previously the Deputy Assistant Secretary for Public Affairs at the U.S. Department of Labor.

He was the Reading Clerk of the U.S. House of Representatives from July 2008 to June 2009, and the first ever Hispanic in this position. He has also worked as Communications Director for the House Committee on Small Business and Entrepreneurship and as a spokesman for both the NABE and the American Federation of Teachers.
