= Mary Kevin Niland =

American political clerk

Mary Kevin Niland is a former Reading Clerk of the United States House of Representatives, a face familiar to viewers of C-SPAN, the network which covers House proceedings. The reading clerk reads bills, motions, and other papers before the House and keeps track of changes to legislation made on the floor.

During the vote for Speaker of the United States House of Representatives at the beginning of each Congress (or when the electronic voting system fails), the Reading Clerk calls the roll of members for voting viva voce.

Niland became Democratic clerk in 1998 at the recommendation of then-House Minority Leader Dick Gephardt of Missouri. She replaced Meg Goetz. Niland served until 2008, when she became Deputy Chief of Legislative Operations in the Office of the Clerk. Her successor as Reading Clerk was Jaime Zapata.

Niland's Republican counterpart was Susan Cole.
