= Meg Goetz =

Mary E. "Meg" Goetz was the first woman to be appointed as a Reading clerk of the United States House of Representatives, a face familiar to viewers of C-SPAN, the network which covers House proceedings.

A graduate of Chestnut Hill College in Philadelphia, she has degrees in political science and economics. She was appointed Democratic reading clerk by Speaker Tip O'Neill in 1982 and served until 1998 when she retired from the House. The reading clerks prepare the official version of all House-passed legislation and maintain all official papers on behalf of the House of Representatives relative to legislation. They report to the House membership all bills, motions, amendments, and all official communications. They also serve as House liaisons to the U.S. Senate, formally transmit all official actions taken by the House, and prepare the official records of all changes to legislation made on the floor. During the vote for Speaker at the beginning of each Congress, or when the electronic voting system fails, the reading clerk calls the roll of House membership. Ms. Goetz was the Vice President for Advocacy for the American Indian Higher Education Consortium, an advocacy group in Washington, D.C. from June 1998 until 2017. She was replaced as House reading clerk for the Democrats by Mary Kevin Niland who was appointed by then Minority Leader Richard Gephardt. She has now fully retired.
