= 1890 in the United States =

- Decades: 1870s; 1880s; 1890s; 1900s; 1910s
- See also: History of the United States (1865–1918); Timeline of United States history (1860–1899); List of years in the United States

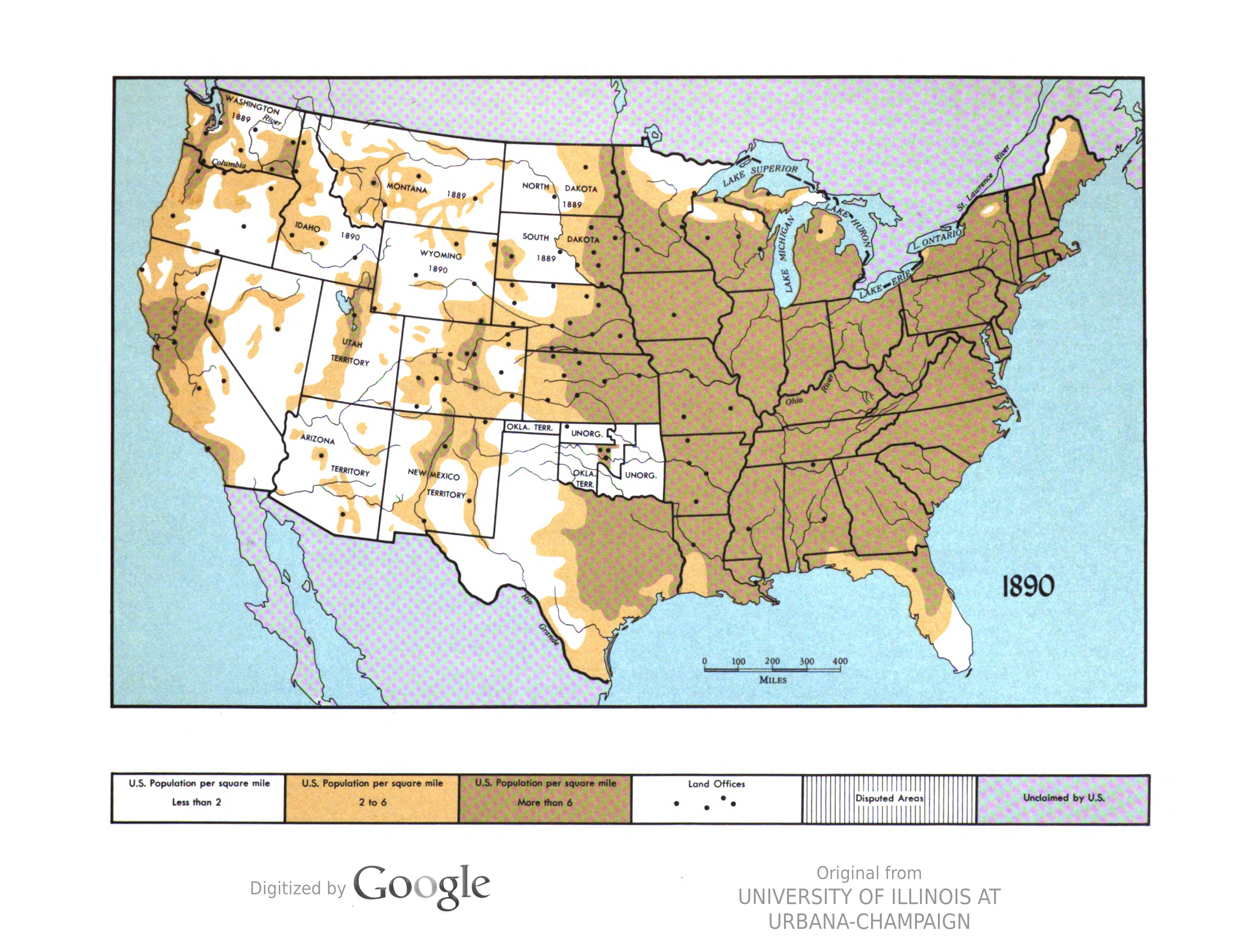
1890 in the United States

Events from the year 1890 in the United States.

== Incumbents ==
=== Federal government ===
- President: Benjamin Harrison (R-Indiana)
- Vice President: Levi P. Morton (R-New York)
- Chief Justice: Melville Fuller (Illinois)
- Speaker of the House of Representatives: Thomas Brackett Reed (R-Maine)
- Congress: 51st

==== State governments ====
Governors and lieutenant governors

=== Governors ===
- Governor of Alabama: Thomas Seay (Democratic) (starting December 1), Thomas G. Jones (Democratic) (starting December 1)
- Governor of Arkansas: James Philip Eagle (Democratic)
- Governor of California: Robert Waterman (Republican)
- Governor of Colorado: Job Adams Cooper (Republican)
- Governor of Connecticut: Morgan G. Bulkeley (Republican)
- Governor of Delaware: Benjamin T. Biggs (Democratic)
- Governor of Florida: Francis P. Fleming (Democratic)
- Governor of Georgia: John Brown Gordon (Democratic) (until November 8), William J. Northen (Democratic) (starting November 8)
- Governor of Idaho: George L. Shoup (Republican) (until December 18), N. B. Willey (Republican) (starting December 18)
- Governor of Illinois: Joseph W. Fifer (Republican)
- Governor of Indiana: Alvin P. Hovey (Republican)
- Governor of Iowa: William Larrabee (Republican) (until February 27), Horace Boies (Democratic) (starting February 27)
- Governor of Kansas: Lyman U. Humphrey (Republican)
- Governor of Kentucky: Simon B. Buckner (Democratic)
- Governor of Louisiana: Francis T. Nicholls (Democratic)
- Governor of Maine: Edwin C. Burleigh (Republican)
- Governor of Maryland: Elihu Emory Jackson (Democratic)
- Governor of Massachusetts: Oliver Ames (Republican) (until January 7), John Q. A. Brackett (Republican) (starting January 7)
- Governor of Michigan: Cyrus G. Luce (Republican)
- Governor of Minnesota: William R. Merriam (Republican)
- Governor of Mississippi: Robert Lowry (Democratic) (until January 13), John M. Stone (Democratic) (starting January 13)
- Governor of Missouri: David R. Francis (Democratic)
- Governor of Montana: Joseph Toole (Democratic)
- Governor of Nebraska: John Milton Thayer (Republican)
- Governor of Nevada: Charles C. Stevenson (Republican) (until September 21), Frank Bell (Republican) (starting September 21)
- Governor of New Hampshire: David H. Goodell (Republican)
- Governor of New Jersey: Robert Stockton Green (Democratic) (until January 21), Leon Abbett (Democratic) (starting January 21)
- Governor of New York: David B. Hill (Democratic)
- Governor of North Carolina: Daniel Gould Fowle (Democratic)
- Governor of North Dakota: John Miller (Republican)
- Governor of Ohio: Joseph B. Foraker (Republican) (until January 13), James E. Campbell (Democratic) (starting January 13)
- Governor of Oregon: Sylvester Pennoyer (Democratic)
- Governor of Pennsylvania: James A. Beaver (Republican)
- Governor of Rhode Island: Herbert W. Ladd (Republican) (until May 26), John W. Davis (Democratic) (starting May 26)
- Governor of South Carolina: John Peter Richardson III (Democratic) (until December 4), Benjamin Ryan Tillman (Democratic) (starting December 4)
- Governor of South Dakota: Arthur C. Mellette (Republican)
- Governor of Tennessee: Robert Love Taylor (Democratic)
- Governor of Texas: Lawrence Sullivan Ross (Democratic)
- Governor of Vermont: William P. Dillingham (Republican) (until October 2), Carroll S. Page (Republican) (starting October 2)
- Governor of Virginia: Fitzhugh Lee (Democratic) (until January 1), Philip W. McKinney (Democratic) (starting January 1)
- Governor of Washington: Elisha Peyre Ferry (Republican)
- Governor of West Virginia: Emanuel Willis Wilson (Democratic) (starting February 6), Aretas B. Fleming (Democratic) (starting February 6)
- Governor of Wisconsin: William D. Hoard (Republican)
- Governor of Wyoming: Francis E. Warren (Republican) (until November 24), Amos W. Barber (Republican) (starting November 24)

=== Lieutenant governors ===
- Lieutenant Governor of California: Stephen M. White (Democratic)
- Lieutenant Governor of Colorado: William Grover Smith (Republican)
- Lieutenant Governor of Connecticut: Samuel E. Merwin (Republican)
- Lieutenant Governor of Idaho: N. B. Willey (Republican) (until December), John S. Gray (Republican) (starting December 2)
- Lieutenant Governor of Illinois: Lyman Ray (Republican)
- Lieutenant Governor of Indiana: Ira Joy Chase (Republican)
- Lieutenant Governor of Iowa: John A. T. Hull (Republican) (until February 27), Alfred N. Poyneer (Republican) (starting February 27)
- Lieutenant Governor of Kansas: Andrew J. Felt (Republican)
- Lieutenant Governor of Kentucky: James William Bryan (political party unknown)
- Lieutenant Governor of Louisiana: James Jeffries (Democratic)
- Lieutenant Governor of Massachusetts: John Q. A. Brackett (Democratic) (until January 4), William H. Haile (Republican) (starting January 4)
- Lieutenant Governor of Michigan: William Ball (Republican)
- Lieutenant Governor of Minnesota: Albert E. Rice (Republican)
- Lieutenant Governor of Mississippi: G. D. Shands (Democratic) (until month and day unknown), M. M. Evans (Democratic) (starting month and day unknown)
- Lieutenant Governor of Missouri: Stephen Hugh Claycomb (Democratic)
- Lieutenant Governor of Montana: John E. Rickards (Republican)
- Lieutenant Governor of Nebraska: George D. Meiklejohn (Republican)
- Lieutenant Governor of Nevada: Frank Bell (Republican) (until September 21), vacant (starting September 21)
- Lieutenant Governor of New York: Edward F. Jones (Democratic)
- Lieutenant Governor of North Carolina: Thomas M. Holt (Democratic)
- Lieutenant Governor of North Dakota: Alfred Dickey (Republican)
- Lieutenant Governor of Ohio:
  - until January 13: William C. Lyon (Republican)
  - January 13-31: Elbert L. Lampson (Republican)
  - starting January 31: William V. Marquis (Republican)
- Lieutenant Governor of Pennsylvania: William T. Davies (Republican)
- Lieutenant Governor of Rhode Island: Daniel Littlefield (Republican) (until May 27), William T. C. Wardwell (political party unknown) (starting May 27)
- Lieutenant Governor of South Carolina: William L. Mauldin (Democratic) (until December 4), Eugene B. Gary (Democratic) (starting December 4)
- Lieutenant Governor of South Dakota: James H. Fletcher (Republican)
- Lieutenant Governor of Tennessee: Benjamin J. Lea (Democratic)
- Lieutenant Governor of Texas: Thomas B. Wheeler (Democratic)
- Lieutenant Governor of Vermont: Urban A. Woodbury (Republican) (until October 2), Henry A. Fletcher (Republican) (starting October 2)
- Lieutenant Governor of Virginia: John Edward "Parson" Massey (Democratic) (until January 1), James Hoge Tyler (Democratic) (starting January 1)
- Lieutenant Governor of Washington: Charles E. Laughton (Republican)
- Lieutenant Governor of Wisconsin: George W. Ryland (Republican)

== Events ==
=== January–June ===
- January–June period – George W. Johnson becomes the first African American to record phonograph cylinders, in New York.
- January 2 – Alice Sanger becomes the first female staffer in the White House.
- January 22 – The United Mine Workers is founded.
- January 25 – Journalist Nellie Bly completes her round-the-world journey in 72 days.
- February 18 – National American Woman Suffrage Association established.
- February 24 – Chicago is selected to host the Columbian Exposition.
- March 2–7 – The Cherry Creek Campaign occurs in Arizona Territory.
- March 3 – The first American football game in Ohio State University history is played in Delaware, Ohio against Ohio Wesleyan University; Ohio State wins 20–14.
- March 8 – North Dakota State University is founded in Fargo, North Dakota.
- March 27 – A tornado strikes Louisville, Kentucky, killing 76 people and injuring 200.
- March 28 – Washington State University is founded in Pullman, Washington.
- May 2 – Oklahoma Territory is organized.
- May 31 – The 5-story skylight Cleveland Arcade opens in Cleveland, Ohio.
- June 1 – The United States Census Bureau begins using Herman Hollerith's tabulating machine to record census returns using punched card input, a landmark in the history of computing hardware. Hollerith's company eventually becomes IBM.
- June 12 – On Lake Huron (Michigan), the wooden steamer Ryan is lost near Thunder Bay Island.
- June 20 – The Picture of Dorian Gray by Oscar Wilde published by Philadelphia-based Lippincott's Monthly Magazine.

=== July–December ===
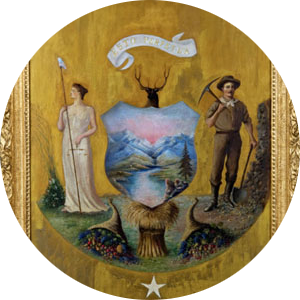
July 3: Idaho becomes the 43rd state (1891–1957 seal pictured)

December 29: Wounded Knee Massacre

- July 2 – The Sherman Antitrust Act becomes U.S. law.
- July 3 – Idaho is admitted as the 43rd U.S. state (see History of Idaho).
- July 10 – Wyoming is admitted as the 44th U.S. state (see History of Wyoming).
- August 4 – Thomas G. Jones is elected the 28th governor of Alabama defeating Benjamin M. Long.
- August 6 – At Auburn Prison in New York, William Kemmler becomes the first person to be executed in the electric chair.
- September 19 – The University of North Texas is founded, as the Texas Normal College and Teacher Training Institute.
- September 24 – The Church of Jesus Christ of Latter-day Saints President Wilford Woodruff issues the "1890 Manifesto" officially advising against any future polygamy in the Church.
- September 25 – Sequoia National Park created.
- October 1 – Yosemite National Park created.
- October 11 – In Washington, D.C., the Daughters of the American Revolution is founded.
- October 13
  - The Delta Chi fraternity is founded by 11 law students at Cornell University in Ithaca, New York.
  - On Lake Huron, the schooner J. F. Warner is lost in Thunder Bay (Michigan).
- November 29 – In West Point, New York, the United States Navy defeats the United States Army 24–0 in the first Army–Navy football game.
- December 1 – Thomas G. Jones is sworn in as the 28th governor of Alabama replacing Thomas Seay.
- December 24 – The Oklahoma territorial legislature establishes three institutions of higher learning University of Oklahoma, Oklahoma State University, and University of Central Oklahoma.
- December 24 – Woman's Canning and Preserving Company was established by Amanda Jones, in Chicago, Illinois.
- December 29 – Wounded Knee Massacre: Near Wounded Knee Creek, South Dakota the U.S. 7th Cavalry Regiment tries to disarm a Native American camp and shooting starts. 153 Lakota Sioux and 25 troops are killed; about 150 flee the scene.

=== Undated ===
- The United States city of Boise, Idaho drills the first geothermal well.
- The corrugated cardboard box is invented by Robert Gair, a Brooklyn printer who developed production of paper-board boxes in 1879.
- The Demarest Building, a commercial building on Fifth Avenue in New York City, is completed as the first with an electric elevator (installed by Otis).
- The march "High School Cadets" is written by John Philip Sousa.
- Brown trout are introduced into the upper Firehole River in Yellowstone National Park.
- The Ohio Northern University Marching Band is founded as a part of the military department. Becoming known as the “Star of Northwest Ohio”, they will perform regularly each football season and travel across the world through their sponsoring university.

=== Ongoing ===
- Gilded Age (1869–c. 1896)
- Gay Nineties (1890–1899)
- Progressive Era (1890s–1920s)

== Sport ==
- September 30 – The Brooklyn Bridegrooms clinch the National League pennant.

== Births ==
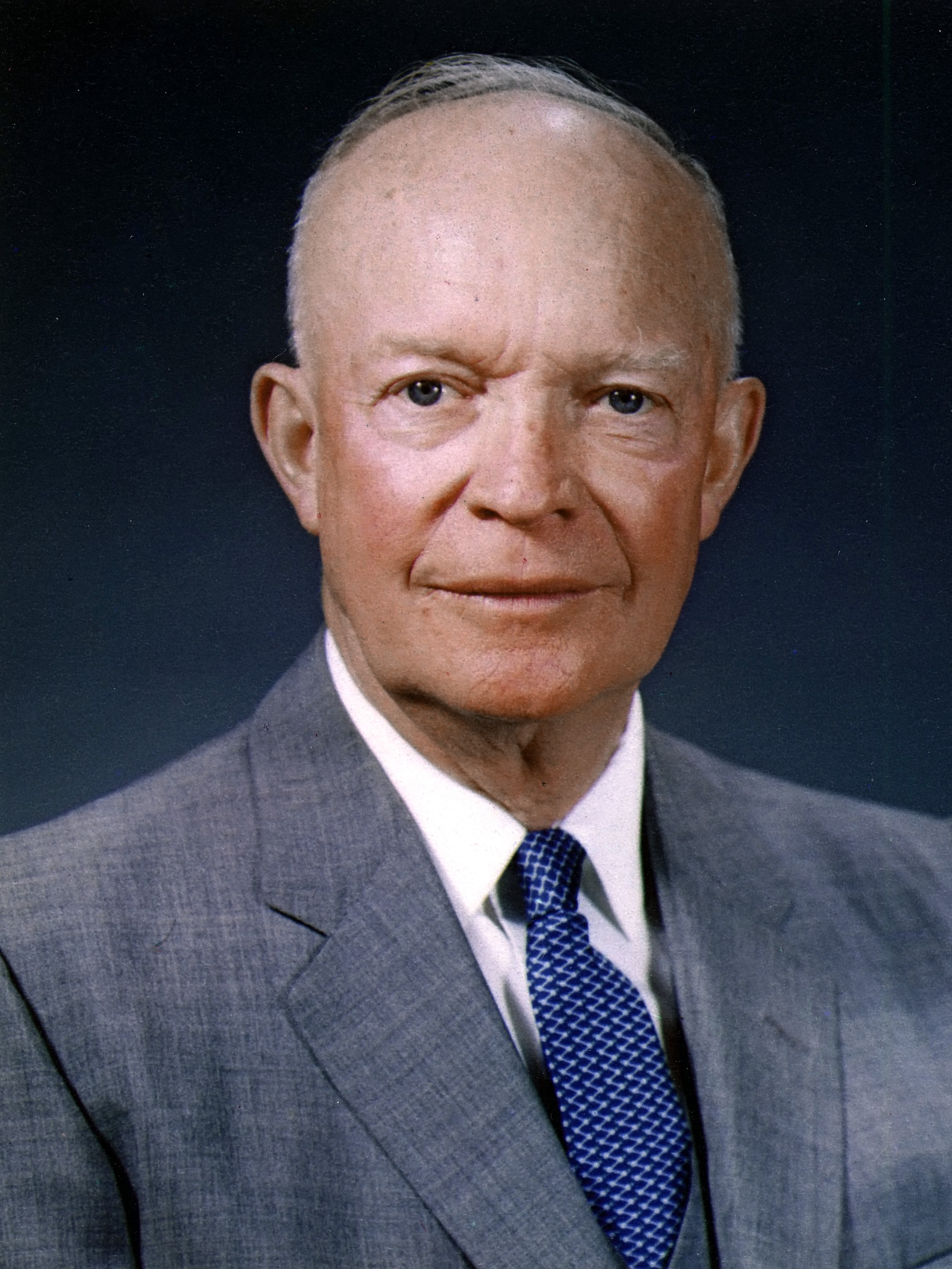
Dwight D. Eisenhower

- January 4 – Victor Adamson, Western film director, producer, screenwriter and actor (died 1972)
- January 21 – Wesley Englehorn, American football player (died 1993)
- January 22 – Fred M. Vinson, 13th Chief Justice of the Supreme Court (died 1953)
- January 28 – Robert Franklin Stroud, "Birdman of Alcatraz" (died 1963)
- February 18
  - Edward Arnold, actor (died 1956)
  - Adolphe Menjou, film actor (died 1963)
- February 24 – Marjorie Main, character actress (died 1975)
- February 27
  - Freddie Keppard, jazz cornet player (died 1933)
  - Art Smith, pilot (died in aviation accident 1926)
- March 11 – Vannevar Bush, science administrator (died 1974)
- March 21 – C. Douglass Buck, U.S. Senator from Delaware from 1943 to 1949 (died 1965)
- March 28 – Paul Whiteman, bandleader (died 1967)
- April 7
  - Marjory Stoneman Douglas, conservationist and writer (died 1998)
  - Harry W. Hill, admiral (died 1971)
- April 13 – Frank Murphy, politician and Associate Justice of the Supreme Court of the United States (died 1949)
- April 23 – Adelbert Ford, psychologist (died 1976)
- May 1 – Laurence Wild, basketball player and 30th Governor of American Samoa (died 1971)
- May 11 – Woodall Rodgers, lawyer and politician, Mayor of Dallas (died 1961)
- May 15 – Katherine Anne Porter, author (died 1980)
- June 1 – Frank Morgan, character actor (died 1949)
- June 12 – Junius Matthews, actor (died 1978)
- June 26
  - Oscar C. Badger II, admiral (died 1958)
  - Jeanne Eagels, actress (died 1929)
- June 28 – William H. P. Blandy, admiral (d. 1954)
- June 30 – Gertrude McCoy, actress (d. 1967)
- July 22 – Rose Kennedy, philanthropist and matriarch of the Kennedy family (died 1995)
- July 26 – Daniel J. Callaghan, admiral (killed in action 1942)
- August 11 – Lillian Holley, sheriff (d. 1994)
- August 20 – H. P. Lovecraft, horror fiction author (died 1937)
- September 9 – Colonel Sanders, founder of Kentucky Fried Chicken (died 1980)
- September 20 – Jelly Roll Morton, jazz pianist, composer and bandleader (died 1941)
- September 24 – Allen J. Ellender, U.S. Senator from Louisiana from 1937 to 1972 (died 1972)
- October 1
  - Alice Joyce, silent film actress (died 1955)
  - Blanche Oelrichs, poet, second wife of John Barrymore (died 1950)
- October 2 – Groucho Marx, comedian (died 1977)
- October 8 – Eddie Rickenbacker, race car driver and World War I fighter pilot (died 1973)
- October 12 – Katherine Corri Harris, socialite and actress, first wife of John Barrymore (died 1927)
- October 13 – Conrad Richter, fiction writer (died 1968)
- October 14 – Dwight D. Eisenhower, 34th president of the United States from 1953 to 1961 (died 1969)
- October 20 – Sherman Minton, U.S. Senator from Indiana from 1935 to 1941, Associate Justice of the Supreme Court of the United States from 1949 to 1956 (died 1965)
- October 25 – Floyd Bennett, aviator and explorer (died 1928)
- December 21 – Hermann Joseph Muller, geneticist, recipient of the Nobel Prize in Physiology or Medicine in 1946 (died 1967)
- December 25 – Robert Ripley, collector of odd facts (died 1949)
- December 26 – Uncle Charlie Osborne, Appalachian fiddler (died 1992)

== Deaths ==
- January 2 – George Henry Boker, poet and playwright (born 1823)
- January 28 – Prudence Crandall, educationist (born 1803)
- February 22 – John Jacob Astor III, businessman (born 1822)
- March 2 – James E. English, U.S. Senator from Connecticut from 1875 to 1876 (born 1812)
- March 19 – John S. Hager, U.S. Senator from California from 1873 to 1875 (born 1818)
- April 1 – David Wilber, politician (born 1820)
- April 19 – James Pollock, politician (born 1810)
- April 30 – Marcus Thrane, author, journalist, and the leader of the first labour movement in Norway (born 1817)
- May 3 – James B. Beck, U.S. Senator from Kentucky from 1877 to 1890 (born 1822 in Scotland)
- May 15 – Edward Doane, Protestant missionary in Micronesia (born 1820)
- June 11
  - George Edward Brett, publisher (born 1829)
  - Hugh Buchanan, politician from Georgia (born 1823)
- June 30 – Samuel Parkman Tuckerman, composer (born 1819)
- July 9 – Clinton B. Fisk, philanthropist and temperance activist (born 1828)
- July 10 – Thomas C. McCreery, U.S. Senator from Kentucky from 1868 to 1871 (born 1816)
- July 13 – John C. Frémont, soldier, explorer and U.S. Senator from California from 1850 to 1851 (born 1813)
- August 6 – William Kemmler, murderer, first person executed in the electric chair (born 1860)
- August 10 – John Boyle O'Reilly, poet, novelist, journalist and transportee (born 1844 in Ireland)
- September 8 – Isaac P. Christiancy, Chief Justice of the Michigan Supreme Court and U.S. Senator from Michigan from 1875 to 1879 (born 1812)
- September 30 – Frederick H. Billings, lawyer and financier (born 1823)
- October 7 – John Hill Hewitt, songwriter (born 1801)
- October 8 – James W. Deaderick, Chief Justice of the Tennessee Supreme Court from 1876 to 1886 (born 1812)
- October 20 – Alfred B. Mullett, architect (born 1834)
- November 7 – Comanche, horse, survivor of Custer's cavalry at the Battle of the Little Bighorn
- December 15 – Sitting Bull, Native American chief (born c. 1831)
- Ann Leah Underhill, one of the Fox sisters, fraudulent medium (born 1814)

== See also ==
- List of American films of the 1890s
- Timeline of United States history (1860–1899)
