= 1888 in the United States =

- Decades: 1860s; 1870s; 1880s; 1890s; 1900s
- See also: History of the United States (1865–1918); Timeline of United States history (1860–1899); List of years in the United States

Events from the year 1888 in the United States.

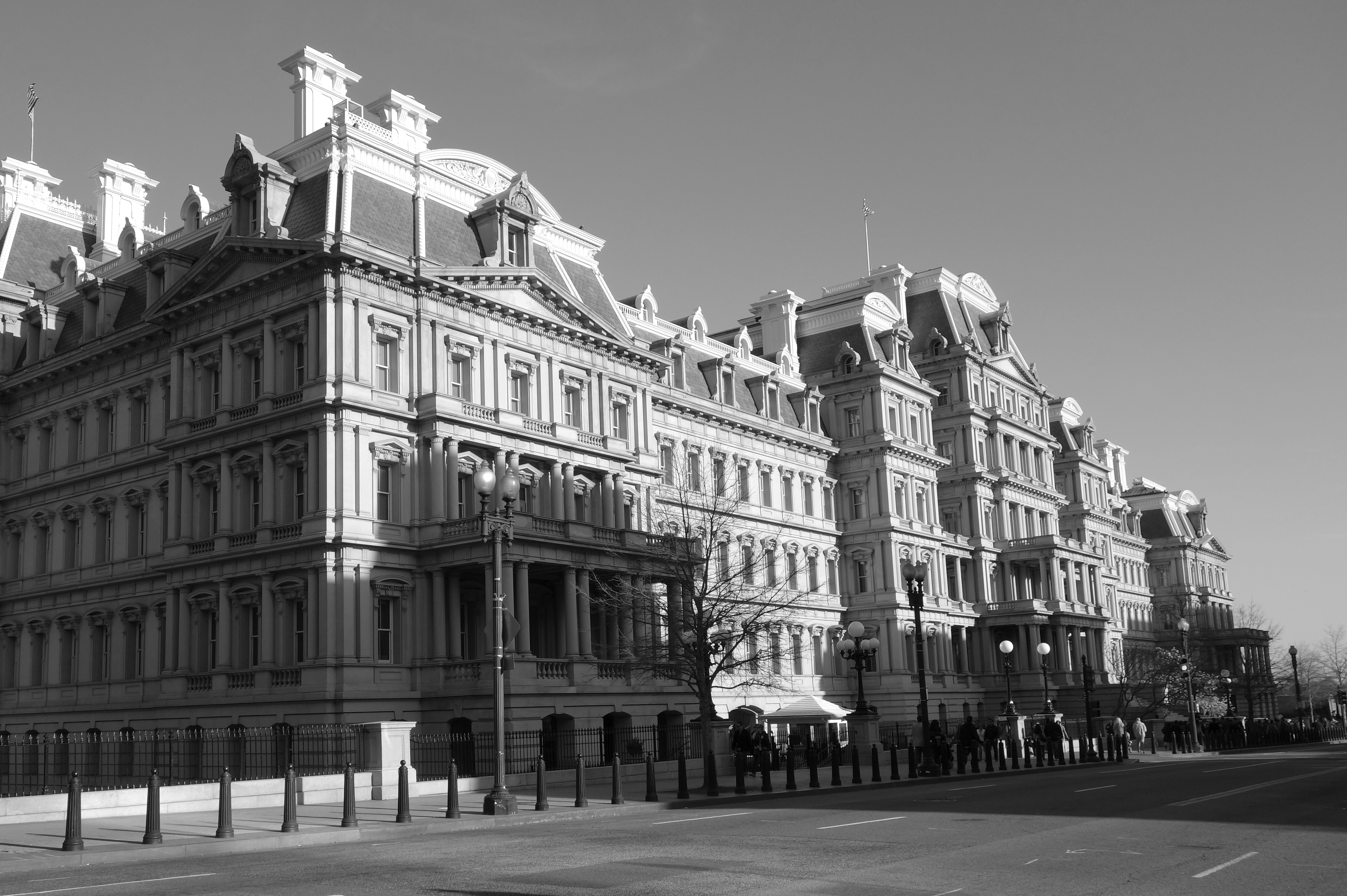
Eisenhower Executive Office Building, built in 1888 in Washington, DC

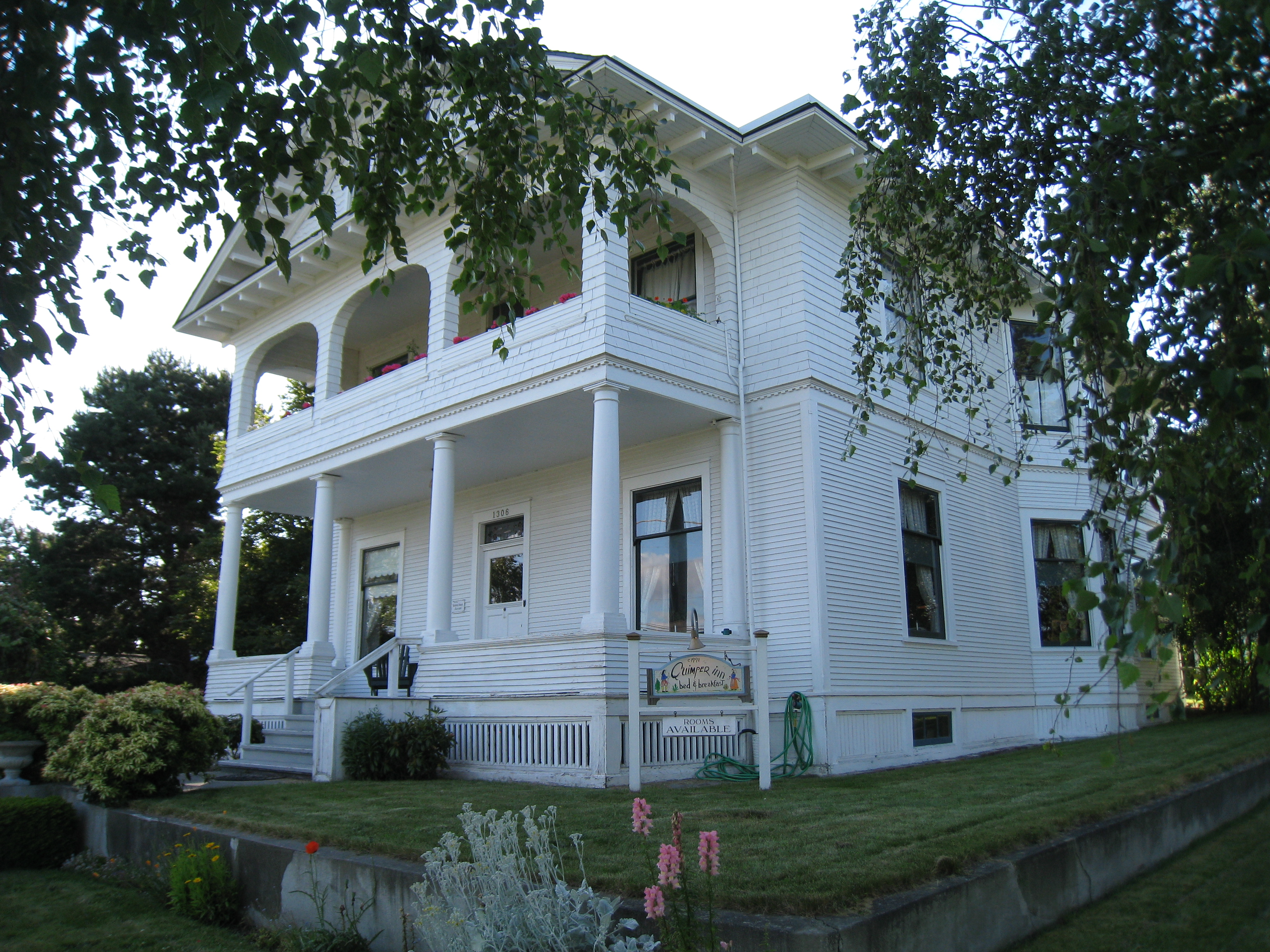
Barthrop House in Port Townsend, Washington, built in 1888

== Incumbents ==
=== Federal government ===
- President: Grover Cleveland (D-New York)
- Vice President: vacant
- Chief Justice:

Morrison Waite (Ohio) (until March 23)
Melville Fuller (Illinois) (starting October 8)

- Speaker of the House of Representatives: John G. Carlisle (D-Kentucky)
- Congress: 50th

==== State governments ====
Governors and lieutenant governors

=== Governors ===
- Governor of Alabama: Thomas Seay (Democratic)
- Governor of Arkansas: Simon Pollard Hughes Jr. (Democratic)
- Governor of California: Robert Waterman (Republican)
- Governor of Colorado: Alva Adams (Democratic)
- Governor of Connecticut: Phineas C. Lounsbury (Republican)
- Governor of Delaware: Benjamin T. Biggs (Democratic)
- Governor of Florida: Edward A. Perry (Democratic)
- Governor of Georgia: John B. Gordon (Democratic)
- Governor of Illinois: Richard J. Oglesby (Republican)
- Governor of Indiana: Isaac P. Gray (Democratic)
- Governor of Iowa: William Larrabee (Republican)
- Governor of Kansas: John A. Martin (Republican)
- Governor of Kentucky: Simon B. Buckner (Democratic)
- Governor of Louisiana: Samuel D. McEnery (Democratic) (until May 20), Francis T. Nicholls (Democratic) (starting May 20)
- Governor of Maine: Sebastian Streeter Marble (Republican)
- Governor of Maryland: Henry Lloyd (Democratic) (until January 11), Elihu Emory Jackson (Democratic) (starting January 11)
- Governor of Massachusetts: Oliver Ames (Republican)
- Governor of Michigan: Cyrus G. Luce (Republican)
- Governor of Minnesota: Andrew R. McGill (Republican)
- Governor of Mississippi: Robert Lowry (Democratic)
- Governor of Missouri: Albert P. Morehouse (Democratic)
- Governor of Nebraska: John Milton Thayer (Republican)
- Governor of Nevada: Charles C. Stevenson (Republican)
- Governor of New Hampshire: Charles H. Sawyer (Republican)
- Governor of New Jersey: Robert Stockton Green (Democratic)
- Governor of New York: David B. Hill (Democratic)
- Governor of North Carolina: Alfred Moore Scales (Democratic)
- Governor of Ohio: Joseph B. Foraker (Republican)
- Governor of Oregon: Sylvester Pennoyer (Democratic)
- Governor of Pennsylvania: James A. Beaver (Republican)
- Governor of Rhode Island: John W. Davis (Democratic) (until May 29), Royal C. Taft (Republican) (starting May 29)
- Governor of South Carolina: John Peter Richardson III (Democratic)
- Governor of Tennessee: Robert Love Taylor (Democratic)
- Governor of Texas: Lawrence Sullivan Ross (Democratic)
- Governor of Vermont: Ebenezer J. Ormsbee (Republican) (until October 4), William P. Dillingham (Republican) (starting October 4)
- Governor of Virginia: Fitzhugh Lee (Democratic)
- Governor of West Virginia: Emanuel Willis Wilson (Democratic)
- Governor of Wisconsin: Jeremiah McLain Rusk (Republican)

=== Lieutenant governors ===
- Lieutenant Governor of California: Stephen M. White (Democratic)
- Lieutenant Governor of Colorado: Norman H. Meldrum (Democratic)
- Lieutenant Governor of Connecticut: James L. Howard (Republican)
- Lieutenant Governor of Florida: Milton H. Mabry (Democratic)
- Lieutenant Governor of Illinois: John Smith (Republican)
- Lieutenant Governor of Indiana: Robert S. Robertson/Alonzo G. Smith (Republican/Democratic)
- Lieutenant Governor of Iowa: John A. T. Hull (Republican)
- Lieutenant Governor of Kansas: Alexander P. Riddle (Republican)
- Lieutenant Governor of Kentucky: James William Bryan (political party unknown)
- Lieutenant Governor of Louisiana: Clay Knobloch (Democratic) (until month and day unknown), James Jeffries (Democratic) (starting month and day unknown)
- Lieutenant Governor of Massachusetts: John Q. A. Brackett (political party unknown)
- Lieutenant Governor of Michigan: James H. MacDonald (Republican)
- Lieutenant Governor of Minnesota: Albert E. Rice (Republican)
- Lieutenant Governor of Mississippi: G. D. Shands (Democratic)
- Lieutenant Governor of Missouri: vacant
- Lieutenant Governor of Nebraska: Hibbard H. Shedd (Republican)
- Lieutenant Governor of Nevada: Henry C. Davis (political party unknown)
- Lieutenant Governor of New York: Edward F. Jones (Democratic)
- Lieutenant Governor of North Carolina: Charles M. Stedman (Democratic)
- Lieutenant Governor of Ohio: Silas A. Conrad (Republican) (until January 9), William C. Lyon (Republican) (starting January 9)
- Lieutenant Governor of Pennsylvania: William T. Davies (Republican)
- Lieutenant Governor of Rhode Island: Samuel R. Honey (political party unknown) (until May 29), Enos Lapham (political party unknown) (starting May 29)
- Lieutenant Governor of South Carolina: William L. Mauldin (Democratic)
- Lieutenant Governor of Tennessee: Z. W. Ewing (Democratic)
- Lieutenant Governor of Texas: Thomas B. Wheeler (Democratic)
- Lieutenant Governor of Vermont: Levi K. Fuller (Republican) (until October 4), Urban A. Woodbury (Republican) (starting October 4)
- Lieutenant Governor of Virginia: John Edward "Parson" Massey (Democratic)
- Lieutenant Governor of Wisconsin: George W. Ryland (Republican)

== Events ==
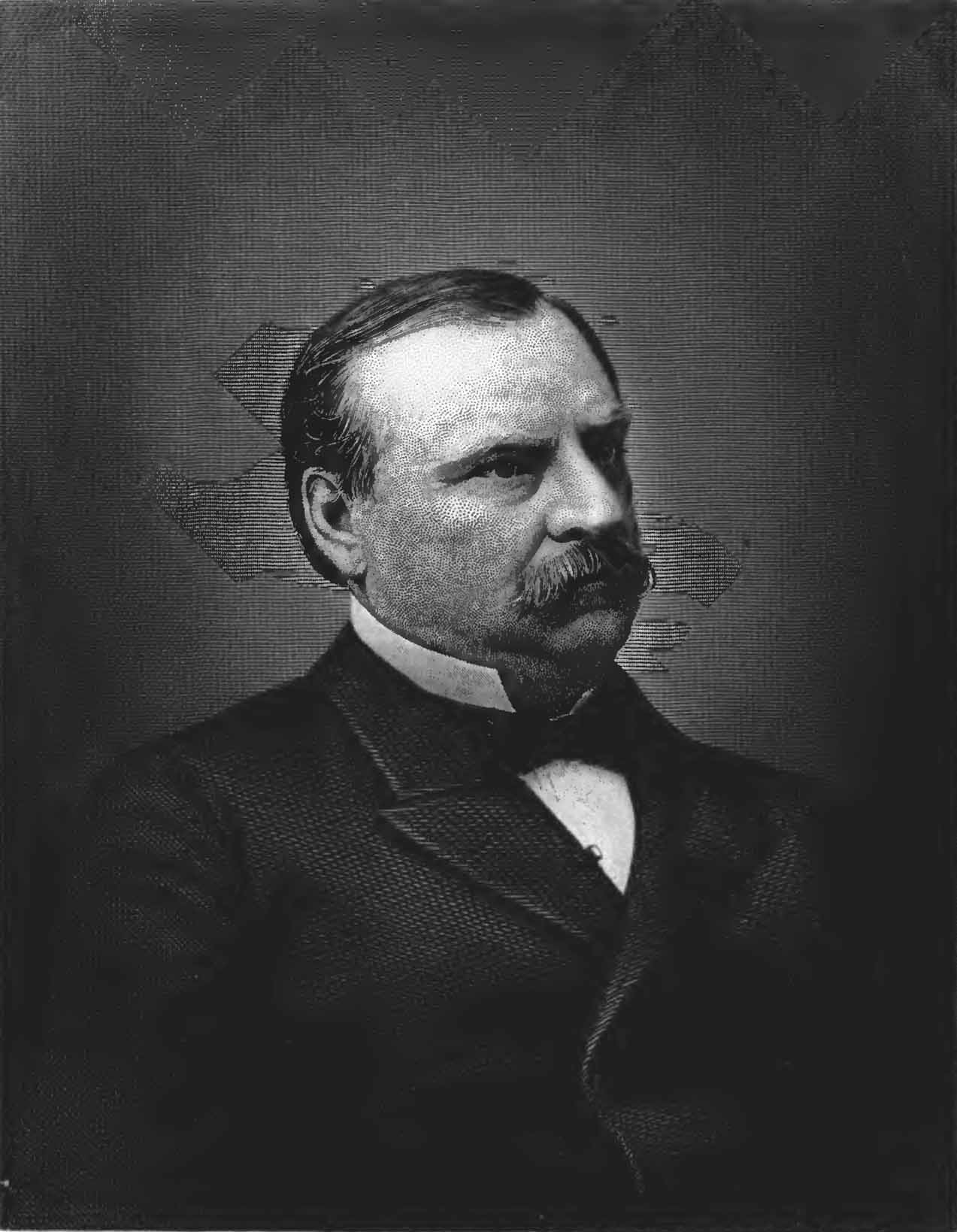
President Grover Cleveland, photo circa 1888, loses his re-election campaign this year, but is re-elected in 1892.

- January 13 – The National Geographic Society is founded in Washington, D.C.
- February 27 – In West Orange, New Jersey, Thomas Edison meets with Eadweard Muybridge, who proposes a scheme for sound film.
- March 8 – The Agriculture College of Utah, (later Utah State University) is founded in Logan, Utah.
- March 11 – The "Great Blizzard of 1888" begins along the East Coast of the United States, shutting down commerce and killing more than 400.
- March 25 – Opening of an international Congress for Women's Rights organized by Susan B. Anthony in Washington, D.C., leading to formation of the International Council of Women, a key event in the international women's movement.
- May 1 – Fort Belknap Indian Reservation is established by the United States Congress.
- May 5 – The International Association of Machinists is founded in Atlanta, Georgia.
- June 3 – Ernest Thayer's baseball poem "Casey at the Bat" is first published (under the pen name "Phin") as the last of his humorous contributions to The San Francisco Examiner.
- June 19 – The Republican Convention opens at the Auditorium Building, Chicago. Benjamin Harrison and Levi Morton win the nominations for President and Vice President, respectively.
- July 25 – Frank E. McGurrin, a court stenographer from Salt Lake City, Utah, purportedly the only person using touch typing at this time, wins a decisive victory over Louis Traub in a typing contest held in Cincinnati, Ohio. This date can be called the birthday of the touch typing method that becomes widely used.
- August 6 – Thomas Seay is reelected the 27th governor of Alabama defeating W. T. Ewing.
- August 10 – Lynching of Amos Miller: 23-year-old African American farmhand Amos Miller is hanged by a mob from the balcony of Williamson County Courthouse (Franklin, Tennessee).
- August 25 – William Seward Burroughs patents the adding machine.
- September 4 – Eastman Kodak Company founded by George Eastman.
- September 8 – President of the United States Grover Cleveland declares the Chinese "impossible of assimilation with our people and dangerous to our peace and welfare" (in a letter accepting renomination for the office of President).
- October – The mediumship of the Fox sisters is confessed to be fraudulent.
- October 9 – The Washington Monument officially opens to the general public in D.C.
- November 6 – 1888 United States presidential election: Democratic Party incumbent Grover Cleveland wins the popular vote, but loses the Electoral College vote to Republican challenger Benjamin Harrison, therefore losing the election.
- November 27 – The sorority Delta Delta Delta is founded at Boston University.
- November 29 – Celebration of Thanksgiving and the first day of Hanukkah coincide.
- December 1 – The Washington Bridge opens to permit-holding pedestrians over the Harlem River in New York City, connecting the boroughs of Manhattan and The Bronx.

=== Undated ===
- The Baldwin School is founded in Bryn Mawr, Pennsylvania, as "Miss [Florence] Baldwin's School for Girls, Preparatory for Bryn Mawr College".
- Global pharmaceutical and health care brands are founded:
  - G.D. Searle by Gideon Daniel Searle in Omaha, Nebraska.
  - Abbott Laboratories as Abbott Alkaloidal by Dr. Wallace C. Abbott in Illinois.
- Katz's Delicatessen is founded on the Lower East Side of Manhattan.
- New Mexico State University is founded in Las Cruces, New Mexico.

=== Ongoing ===
- Gilded Age (1869–c. 1896)

== Sport ==
- October 25 – The New York Giants clinch their First National League Championship series with an 11–3 win over the St. Louis Browns. The final 2 games will be played for revenue purposes with St. Louis winning both contests for an overall series result of 6 games to 4 in favor of the Giants.
- November 24 - Yale wins the Consensus College Football National Championship

== Births ==
- January 1 – John Garand, inventor and designer of the M1 Garand (died 1974)
- January 16 – Robert Henry English, admiral (died 1943)
- c. January 20 – Huddie William Ledbetter (Lead Belly), folk and blues singer (died 1949)
- February 22 – Owen Brewster, U.S. Senator from Maine from 1941 to 1952 (died 1961)
- February 25 – John Foster Dulles, U.S. Secretary of State from 1953 to 1959 (died 1959)
- March 4 – Knute Rockne, American football player and coach (died 1931)
- March 10 – Ilo Wallace, Second Lady of the United States as wife of Henry A. Wallace (died 1981)
- March 26 – Gerald Murphy, socialite (died 1964)
- March 29 – James E. Casey, businessman and founder of UPS (died 1983)
- April 8 – Dennis Chávez, U.S. Senator from New Mexico from 1935 to 1962 (died 1962)
- April 26 – Anita Loos, writer (died 1981)
- May 11
  - Irving Berlin, composer (died 1989)
  - Willis Augustus Lee, admiral and sport shooter (died at sea 1945)
- May 15 – John E. Miller, U.S. Senator from Arkansas from 1937 to 1941 (died 1981)
- June 3 – Tom Brown, jazz musician (died 1958)
- June 6 – Pete Wendling, composer, pianist and piano roll recording artist (died 1974)
- June 16 – Peter Stoner, mathematician, astronomer and Christian apologist (died 1980)
- June 23 – F. Ryan Duffy, judge and politician (died 1979)
- July 5 – Herbert Spencer Gasser, physiologist, winner of the Nobel Prize in Physiology or Medicine in 1944 (died 1963)
- July 8 – John R. Sinnock, 8th Chief Engraver of the United States Mint (died 1947)
- July 10 – Hazel Abel, U.S. Senator from Nebraska in 1954 (died 1966)
- July 20 – Geneve L. A. Shaffer, realtor, lecturer and author (died 1976)
- July 22 – Kirk Bryan, geologist (died 1950)
- July 23 – Raymond Chandler, novelist (died 1959)
- July 31 – William Warren Barbour, U.S. Senator from New Jersey from 1931 to 1937 (died 1943)
- August 5 – George W. Christians, founder of the Crusader White Shirts (died 1983)
- August 6 – Stephen Galatti, American Field Service director (d. 1964)
- August 16 – Armand J. Piron, jazz musician (died 1943)
- August 19 – Sam G. Bratton, U.S. Senator from New Mexico from 1925 to 1933 (died 1963)
- September 2 – Charles C. Gossett, U.S. Senator from Idaho from 1945 to 1946 (died 1974)
- September 6 – Joseph P. Kennedy Sr., politician (died 1969)
- September 26
  - J. Frank Dobie, folklorist and journalist (died 1964)
  - T. S. Eliot, American-born poet, winner of the Nobel Prize in Literature in 1948 (died 1965 in the United Kingdom)
- October 4 – Lucy Tayiah Eads, Kaw tribal chief (died 1961)
- October 7 – Henry A. Wallace, 33rd vice president of the United States from 1941 to 1945 (died 1965)
- October 16
  - Eugene O'Neill, dramatist, winner of the Nobel Prize in Literature in 1936 (died 1953)
  - Paul Popenoe, eugenicist (died 1979)
- October 20 – Milton C. Portmann Professional football player, WWI Army Officer, Attorney. (died 1967)
- October 30 – Alan Goodrich Kirk, admiral (died 1963)
- November 13 – Philip Francis Nowlan, science fiction writer, creator of the Buck Rogers character (died 1940)
- November 17 – J. Melville Broughton, U.S. Senator from North Carolina from 1948 to 1949 (died 1949)
- November 23 – Harpo Marx, comedian (died 1964)
- November 24 – Roy Earl Parrish, politician (died 1918)
- November 28 – Edgar Church, comic book collector (died 1978)
- December 18 – Robert Moses, public works director (died 1981)

== Deaths ==
- January 21 – Adolph Douai, German-American socialist and abolitionist newspaper editor, journalist and teacher (born 1819)
- February 8 – Robert H. Anderson, infantry officer in the United States Army and brigadier general in the Confederate States Army (born 1835)
- February 11 – William Kelly, inventor (born 1811)
- March 4 – Amos Bronson Alcott, educator and writer (born 1799)
- March 6 – Louisa May Alcott, author (born 1832)
- March 7 – Christopher Memminger, German-born American politician, 1st Confederate States Secretary of the Treasury (born 1803)
- March 19 – John Pendleton King, U.S. Senator from Georgia from 1833 to 1837 (born 1799)
- March 23 - Morrison Waite, 7th Chief Justice of the Supreme Court (born 1816)
- April 18 – Roscoe Conkling, leader of the Stalwart faction of the Republican Party (born 1829)
- May 6 – Abraham Joseph Ash, rabbi (born c. 1813)
- July 23 – Williams Carter Wickham, lawyer, politician, and Confederate general (born 1820)
- August 14 – Charles Crocker, railroad executive (born 1822)
- August 16 – John Pemberton, pharmacist and inventor of Coca-Cola (born 1831)
- August 22 – Charles W. Cathcart, U.S. Senator from Indiana from 1845 to 1853 (born 1809)
- September 30 – Eunice Newton Foote, physicist and women's rights campaigner (born 1819)
- October 16 – John Wentworth, mayor of Chicago from 1857 to 1858 and 1860 to 1861 (born 1815)
- November 20 – Nathaniel Currier, illustrator (born 1813)
- December 18 – Eagle Woman, Lakota leader (born 1820)

== See also ==
- Timeline of United States history (1860–1899)
