= Robert Maynard Murray =

American politician

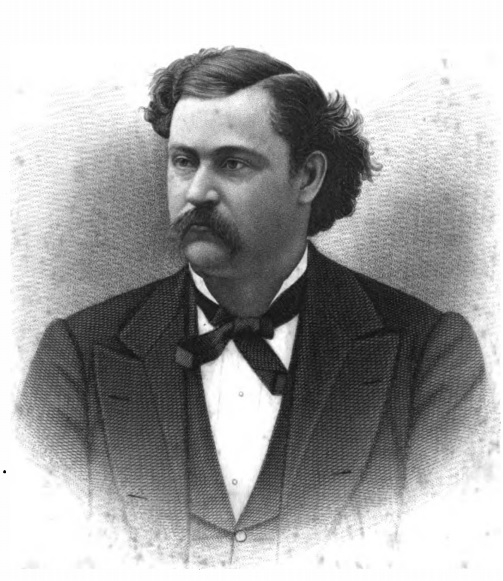

Member of the U.S. House of Representatives from Ohio's 3rd district
- In office March 4, 1883 – March 3, 1885
- Preceded by: Henry Lee Morey
- Succeeded by: James E. Campbell

Personal details
- Born: November 28, 1841 Concord, Ohio, US
- Died: August 2, 1913 (aged 71) Cleveland, Ohio, US
- Resting place: Evergreen Cemetery, Painesville, Ohio, US
- Party: Democratic
- Education: Oberlin College; Cleveland Law School

Military service
- Allegiance: United States
- Branch/service: Union Army
- Unit: 150th Ohio Infantry
- Battles/wars: American Civil War

Robert Maynard Murray (November 28, 1841 – August 2, 1913) was an attorney, banker, businessman and member of the United States House of Representatives from Ohio for one term from 1883 to 1885.

== Life and career ==
Robert M. Murray was born in Concord, Ohio, the son of Robert and Sophrenia Murray II. The family moved to Mentor, Ohio when Robert was five years old, where he attended local public schools until age 15 then the Western Reserve Teachers' Seminary at Kirtland, Ohio and the Willoughby Academy at Willoughby, Ohio. He attended Oberlin College but decided on a career in law.

He was admitted to the United States and Ohio bar after graduating from the Cleveland Law School. He joined the firm of Ranney, Backus & Noble until 1864 when he answered the call during the Civil War for Hundred Days Men and served in Company D, 150th Ohio Infantry. He returned to the practice of law until 1867.

In 1867 he joined the family banking business in Painesville, Ohio for nine years and was collector, bookkeeper and then cashier of the First National Bank of Painesville. In 1874 he became a member of the school board in Painesville for three years and subsequently was elected mayor of Painesville, serving from 1877 to 1879.

In 1879 Robert M. Murray removed to Piqua, Ohio, engaging in the manufacture of handles for agricultural implements.

=== Congress ===
In 1882 he was narrowly elected as a Democrat from Ohio's third district to the Forty-eighth Congress from Ohio's third district. He was an unsuccessful candidate for reelection in 1884.

== Later career and death ==
After his congressional service, he resumed his former business pursuits in Piqua. He moved to Cleveland, Ohio in 1892 and engaged in the storage business. He died Cleveland and was interred in Evergreen Cemetery, Painesville, Ohio.

U.S. House of Representatives
Preceded by Henry Lee Morey	U.S. Representative from Ohio's 3rd congressional district 1883–1885	Succeeded by James E. Campbell
