= Henry Lee Morey =

American politician

Henry L. Morey
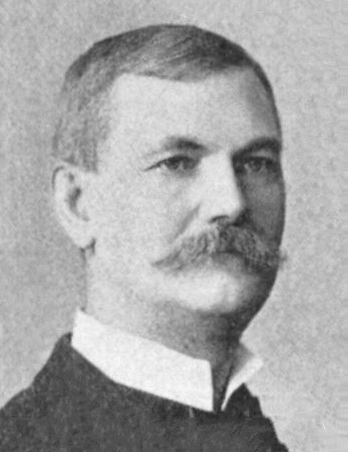

Member of the U.S. House of Representatives from Ohio
- In office March 4, 1881 – June 20, 1884
- Preceded by: John A. McMahon
- Succeeded by: James E. Campbell
- Constituency: 3rd district (1881-1883); 7th district (1883-1884)
- In office March 4, 1889 – March 3, 1891
- Preceded by: James E. Campbell
- Succeeded by: William E. Haynes
- Constituency: 7th district

Personal details
- Born: Henry Lee Morey; April 8, 1841 Butler County, Ohio, US
- Died: December 29, 1902 (aged 61) Hamilton, Ohio, US
- Resting place: Greenwood Cemetery (Hamilton, Ohio)
- Party: Republican
- Spouse(s): Mary M. Campbell; Ella R. Campbell
- Education: Miami University

Military service
- Allegiance: United States
- Branch/service: (United States) Union Army
- Years of service: 1861–1865
- Rank: Captain
- Unit: 20th Ohio Infantry; 75th Ohio Infantry

Henry Lee Morey (April 8, 1841 – December 29, 1902) was an officer in the United States Army during the American Civil War and a politician and U.S. congressman after the war.

He was a cousin of James Whitcomb, governor of Indiana (1843–1848) and United States Senator from Indiana (1849–1852).

== Early life and career ==
Henry L. Morey was born in Milford Township, Ohio. He was a son of William and Derexa (Whitcomb) Morey, and the great-grandson of Revolutionary War officer Silas Morey and grandson of Revolutionary soldier Anthony Whitcomb. William Morey in his early life was a hatter and to buy furs he occasionally visited New Orleans, where he witnessed the workings of slavery. He abhorred what he saw and became a radical abolitionist. Returning to Ohio, William opened his home as part of the Underground Railroad, and was well known as a friend of the black man.

Henry received his education in the local public schools and the Morning Sun Academy at the village of Rising Sun. He then entered Miami University at Oxford, Ohio.

== Civil War ==
On the day after the fall of Fort Sumter, Morey left the university and enlisted as a member of the University Rifles, a military organization attached to the 20th Ohio Infantry, serving an enlistment of three months in West Virginia under General Robert C. Schenck.

Morey then enlisted in the 75th Ohio Volunteer Infantry for a term of three years, and served under Generals Franz Sigel in the Shenandoah Valley of Virginia, John Pope and Edward Hatch in Florida and Quincy A. Gillmore at the siege of Charleston. He was successively promoted corporal, sergeant, second lieutenant, first lieutenant, and captain. Three of his brothers, Oliver P., Joseph W., and James E. Morey, also served in the Union Army.

He took part in the engagement at Monterey. He commanded his company in engagements at Franklin, Battle of McDowell and Shaw's Ridge, Strasburg, Battle of Cross Keys, Battle of Cedar Mountain, Battle of Rappahannock Station I (Freeman's Ford, Sulphur Springs, and Waterloo Bridge), Second Battle of Bull Run, Battle of Aldie and Battle of Chancellorsville in Virginia. He was taken prisoner at the battle of Chancellorsville and confined in the notorious Libby Prison until exchanged. He again commanded his company in the battles of Battle of Fort Wagner, Morris Island, Fort Gregg and in the siege of Fort Sumter in South Carolina and engagements at Camp Baldwin and Battle of Gainesville in Florida. He was mustered out in 1865. On April 25, 1865, he married Mary M. Campbell, the daughter of an Ohio state senator.

== Postbellum career ==
Morey then undertook the study of law and was graduated from the Indianapolis Law School in 1867 and was admitted to the Ohio bar, commencing practice in Hamilton, Ohio, in partnership with one of his six brothers. His wife Mary died July 1, 1867, in Hamilton. On February 26, 1873, he was married to Ella R. Campbell, sister of his first wife.

Morey was elected as a Republican to two terms as city solicitor of Hamilton (1871–1875). He was also elected prosecuting attorney of Butler County, Ohio, in 1873, serving concurrently. In 1875, he ran unsuccessfully for the Ohio Senate. H. L. Morey was a delegate to the Republican National Convention in 1876.

=== Congress ===
In 1880, he was elected as a Republican from Ohio's third district to the Forty-seventh Congress. In 1882, following the reapportionment as a result of the 1880 census, he ran in Ohio's seventh district and presented credentials as a Member-elect to the Forty-eighth Congress, serving until June 20, 1884. James E. Campbell successfully contested the election and was seated June 21, 1884. He was a delegate to the Republican National Convention in 1884. In 1888, Morey was again elected from Ohio's seventh district to the Fifty-first Congress. However, back in the Third district the following term, he was an unsuccessful candidate for reelection in 1890.

=== Later career and death ===
After his last term in Congress, Morey resumed the practice of law in Hamilton. He was a Mason, having advanced to the Knight Templar degree. He also was an Odd Fellow, a Knight of Pythias and a member of the Royal Arcanum.

He died in 1902 and was interred in Greenwood Cemetery.

== See also ==
U.S. House of Representatives
Preceded by John A. McMahon	U.S. Representative from Ohio's 3rd district 1881–1883	Succeeded by Robert Maynard Murray
Preceded by John Peter Leedom	U.S. Representative from Ohio's 7th district 1883–1884	Succeeded by James E. Campbell
Preceded by James E. Campbell	U.S. Representative from Ohio's 7th district 1889–1891	Succeeded by William Elisha Haynes
