= H. Martin Williams =

American government official

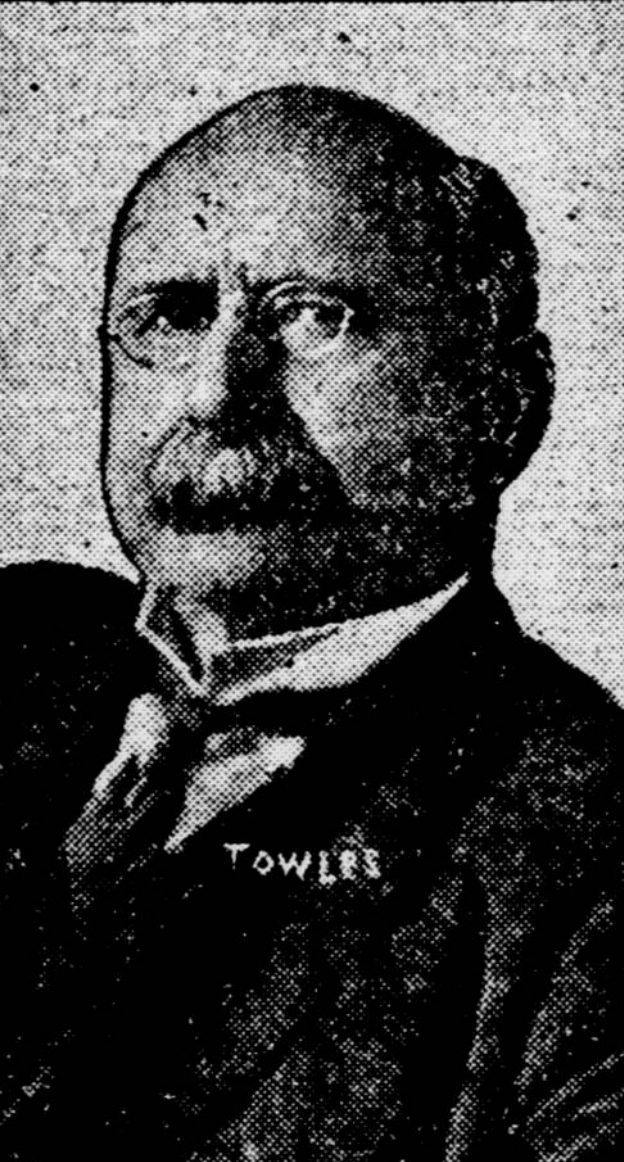

Reading Clerk of the United States House of Representatives
- In office 1913–1919
- Served with: Patrick Joseph Haltigan (1913–1919)
- Preceded by: Dennis E. Alward
- Succeeded by: Alney E. Chaffee

Personal details
- Born: April 7, 1840 Knox County, Ohio, U.S.
- Died: March 8, 1924 (aged 83) Riverdale, Maryland
- Party: Democratic

Military service
- Allegiance: United States of America
- Branch/service: United States Army
- Rank: Colonel

H. Martin Williams (August 7, 1840 – March 8, 1924) was an American Government official, newspaper publisher, lawyer, and educator who served as a reading clerk to the Missouri House of Representatives and as the Reading Clerk of the United States House of Representatives for six years from 1913 to 1919. Williams advocated for progressive causes throughout his lengthy career involved in politics, having served with the Knights of Labor and the Greenback Party.

== Early life and political interest ==
H. Martin Williams was born, August 7, 1840, in Knox County, Ohio. At the age of 17, Williams became a school teacher, during which Williams started closely following politics, first by supporting the James Buchanan presidential campaign in 1856 and later following the Lincoln–Douglas debates.

== Political career ==
In the 1860 United States presidential election, Williams joined the foray of politics, supporting presidential candidate Stephen A. Douglas against Abraham Lincoln, John C. Breckinridge, and John Bell. Throughout the course of the campaign, Williams made a total of 65 campaign speeches in support of Douglas.

Williams was admitted to the bar in 1867, and practiced law in Crestline, Ohio for two years until 1869, when Williams then moved to Holden, Missouri, where he continued the practice of law until 1874, when be ended his legal career to focus fully on publishing and editing newspapers and making public speeches on economics and other political topics. Among the papers published by Williams include "New Era", "The Jeffersonian", "The Holden Democrat", and "Greenback News".

In the 1872 United States presidential election and 1876 United States presidential election, Williams supported the choice of Peter Cooper as the Democratic nominee for president. From 1878 to 1888, Williams served as a prominent member and supporter of the Greenback Party, where for a period, Williams served as the Chairman of the National Greenback Labour State central committee.

In the early 1800s, Williams became a lecturer with the Knights of Labour, and supported of the New York City mayoral campaign of Henry George, a major proponent of land and tax reform.

Throughout this period, Williams and his newspapers consistently advocated for the direct election of U.S. Senators, the implementation of a merit-based public service system as opposed to the already existing spoils system, and a broad supporter of soft money and other policies of the Democratic Party.

In 1890, Williams attended the first Single Tax Conference in New York City, which was part of the Single Tax Movement. Williams was elected as the permanent chairman of the convention.

On June 5, 1894, Williams was appointed as the inaugural president of the Democratic Editorial Association of Missouri.

During this period, Williams wrote and published numerous academic papers on land monopolies across the United States, which would be impacted and constrained by his proposed Single Tax system.

== Service as a Reading Clerk ==
For sixteen of the twenty-four years from 1870 during which Williams published newspapers, he served as the Reading Clerk of the Missouri House of Representatives.

In 1910, Williams moved to Washington, D.C., and in 1913, became the Reading Clerk of the United States House of Representatives, succeeding Dennis E. Alward. He served in this capacity for 6 years, retiring in 1919.

== Death ==
H. Martin Williams died in Riverdale, Maryland on March 8, 1924, in the home of Jessie L. Lane, his niece.
