= 1888 Alabama gubernatorial election =

- August 6, 1888
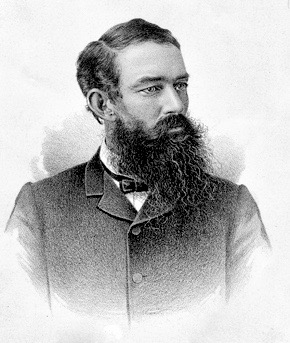

Nominee	Thomas Seay	W. T. Ewing
Party	Democratic	Republican
Popular vote	155,973	44,707
Percentage	77.60%	22.24%
- County results Seay: 50–60% 60–70% 70–80% 80–90% 90–100% Ewing: 50–60% No Data
Governor before election
Thomas Seay
Democratic
Elected Governor
Thomas Seay
Democratic

The 1888 Alabama gubernatorial election took place on August 6, 1888, in order to elect the governor of Alabama. Incumbent Democrat Thomas Seay ran for reelection to a second term.

== Results ==
1888 Alabama gubernatorial election
Party	Candidate	Votes	%
Democratic	Thomas Seay (incumbent)	149,591	77.63%
Republican	W. T. Ewing	42,805	22.21%
Prohibition	J. C. Orr	301	0.20%
Total votes		192,697	100.00%
Democratic hold			
