= W. T. Ewing =

American politician, physician, postmaster (1823–1891)

Whitley Thomas Ewing M.D.
- Born: December 28, 1823; Washington County, Virginia, U.S.
- Died: August 24, 1891 (aged 67); Gadsden, Alabama, U.S.
- Burial place: Forrest Cemetery, Gadsden, Alabama, U.S.
- Other name: W. T. Ewing
- Education: Manual Labor School, Marietta College, St. Louis Medical College
- Occupations: Political organizer, physician, postmaster
- Political party: Republican Party
- Other political affiliations: Radical Republicans
- Spouse: Hannah Jane Pettingill (m. 1855–1886; her death)
- Children: 5

Whitley Thomas Ewing (December 28, 1823 – August 24, 1891), commonly known as W.T. Ewing, was an American political organizer, physician, and postmaster. Ewing who was a Union Army supporter, worked as a Republican Party organizer after the American Civil War. Historian Walter L. Fleming described him as one of the "Moulton Leaguers", who first organized the "radical party" in northeastern Alabama in 1865, and active in politics in Baine County, Alabama (now Etowah County, Alabama).

== Early life and education ==
Whitley Thomas Ewing was born on December 28, 1823, in Washington County, Virginia, U.S. His father Samuel Ewing was a teacher, and died in 1825. He had six siblings, and they were raised in the country. At the age of 15, he and one of his brothers traveled west, possibly to get away from a step-father; and visiting Alabama, Tennessee, Arkansas, and Louisiana. His brother William Ewing moved to Quincy, Illinois, which prompted Whitley to follow him there.

He worked as a laborer at the Manual Labor School in Quincy, Illinois for four years. After he entered Marietta College in Marietta, Ohio, and to pay for his education he taught at a local school. After graduation be moved back to Quincy, and studied medicine under Dr. Stahl. He graduated at St. Louis Medical College (now Washington University School of Medicine) in 1848.

== Career ==
In 1848, Ewing opened a private medical practice in St. Louis. A year later, Ewing and a brother went to California (via an overland route) during the California gold rush and set up a medical hospital located between Hangtown (now Placerville, California) and Cold Springs.

In 1855, Ewing returned to St. Louis, where he married Hannah Pettingill in August. They had five children. He was a member of the Baptist Church, however he had grown up in the Presbyterian Church.

Months later, they moved to Cass County, Georgia (now Bartow County, Georgia) where he remained for 8 years practicing medicine. He left the state of Georgia in 1862, due to the American Civil War and his support of the Union Army.

Ewing moved from Georgia to Gadsden, Alabama in the northeast of the state, and he continued practicing medicine. He was a delegate from Baine County (now Etowah County, Alabama) at the 1867 and 1868 Alabama Reconstruction Conventions, which kick started his interest in politics. Ewing opposed the 1868 efforts that changed the county's name to Etowah from Baine, which had been in honor of Confederate States Army military commander David W. Baine who was killed in battle in 1862. Ewing served as the postmaster for Gadsden, Alabama starting in 1866.

He finished third in a campaign for a seat in the U.S. House of Representatives for Alabama's 5th district in 1868, behind J. W. Burke and winner John B. Callis. He ran for 27th governor of Alabama with Republican nomination in 1888, and was defeated by Thomas Seay.

== Death ==
He died on August 24, 1891, in Gadsden, Alabama, and was buried at Forrest Cemetery.

The Ewing Ferry (formerly known as the Walker Ferry) was named in his honor.
