= Dennis E. Alward =

American government official and newspaper publisher (1859–1930)

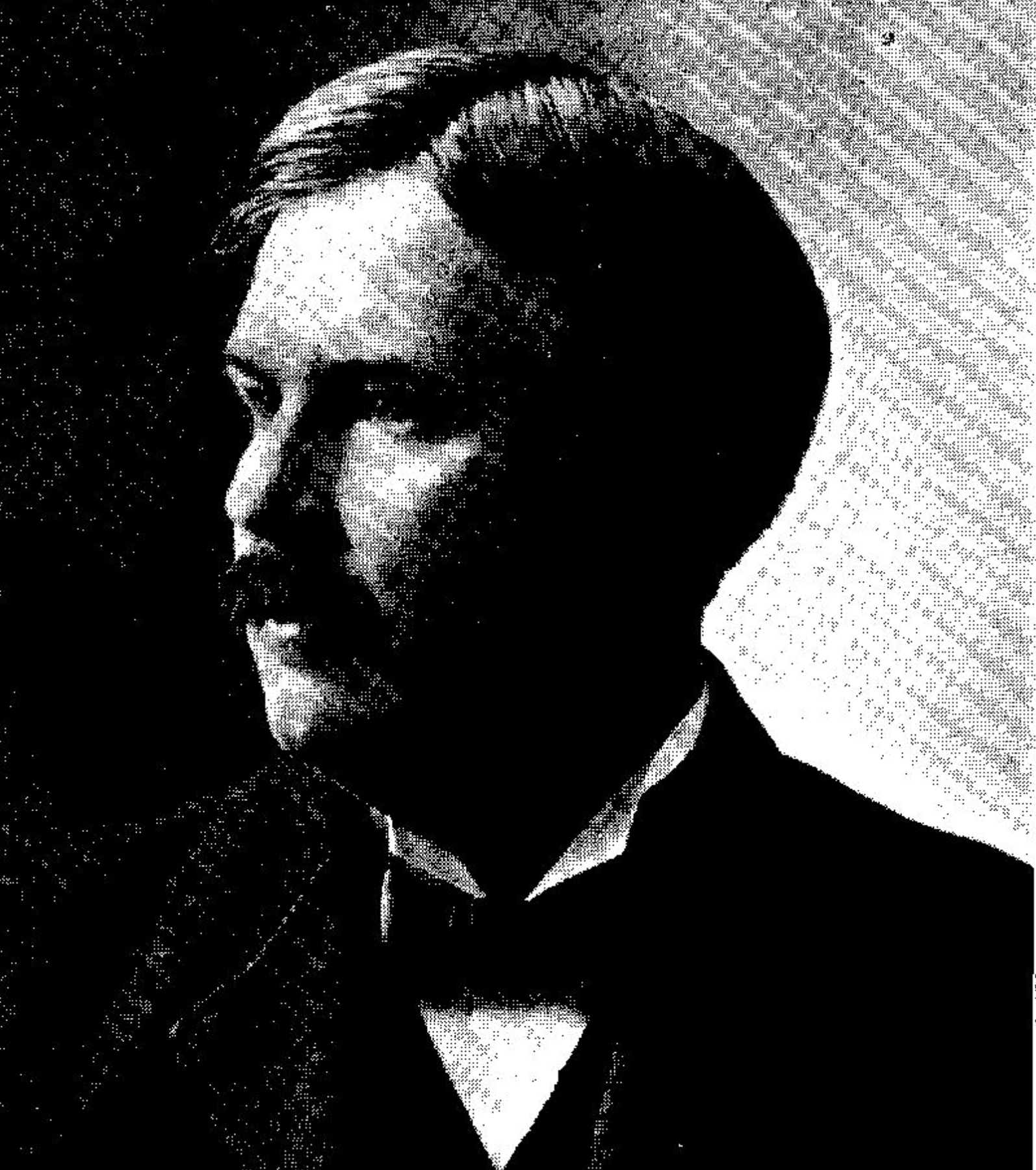

Reading Clerk of the United States House of Representatives
- In office 1897–1913
- Served with: E. L. Lampson (1897–1911); Patrick Joseph Haltigan (1911–1913)
- Preceded by: R. S. Hatcher
- Succeeded by: H. Martin Williams

Personal details
- Born: January 26, 1859 Niles, Michigan, US
- Died: May 22, 1930 (aged 71) Detroit, Michigan, US
- Party: Republican
- Education: University of Michigan

Dennis Eldred Alward (January 26, 1859 – May 22, 1930) was a United States Government official and newspaper publisher who served as the Reading Clerk of the United States House of Representatives for 16 years from 1987 to 1913. Prior to serving as the Reading Clerk, Alward served in numerous of other clerical offices and within the newspaper business.

== Personal life ==
Dennis Eldred Alward was born on January 26, 1859, to a well known local attorney, Cryus M. Alward in Niles, Michigan. He attended Niles High School and then entered the literary department at the University of Michigan, studying law.

Alward married Etta Stross, on November 11, 1879, and had one son, Hazel, in 1890.

Alward was a member of numerous different fraternial organizations throughout the course of his life, having been part of the Freemasons, an Oddfellow, a member of the Knights of Pythias, and held a membership within the Ancient Order of United Workmen, Modern Woodmen, and the Loyal Guard.

== Career ==
Once Alward graduated from the University of Michigan, began a brief teaching career. After departing from teaching, Alward started a daily local newspaper, Battle Creek Moon, which found immense success. In 1980, Alward sold his ownership of the Battle Creek Moon to one of his business partners, and purchased the Clare Press, a Republican-focused magazine. He published this paper for ten years.

In 1887, Alward first saw his entrance into politics with his appointment as the Clerk to the Senate Committee on Railroads in the Michigan Senate. This role later saw him advance to the role of Assistant Secretary of the Senate in 1889. He became the Secretary of the State Senate in 1893.

Beginning in From 1893 to 1897, Alward served as the Secretary of the State Senate of Michigan. Following his departure as Reading Clerk of the House of Representatives, Alward then returned to his role as the Secretary of the state Senate.

Alward was appointed as the Secretary of the State Michigan Republican Party in 1896, where he held manage and lead campaigns of various Michigan Republicans. He resigned from this role in 1898, but once again was named Secretary in 1900. Past this point, various attempts for Alward to resign the role were rejected by the chair of the state party.

In the fifty-fourth Congress, Alward served as the Superintendent of the House document Room. Beginning from 1897 and ending in 1913, Alward was appointed as the Reading Clerk of the House of Representatives by a unanimous acclamation. During his service as House Reading Clerk, Alward was not once absent from a session of the House of Representatives.

Alward served as the Reading Clerk at the Republican National Conventions of 1904, 1908, 1912, 1916, 1920, and 1924. Infamously, the 1912 Republican National Convention resulted in the temporary fracture of the Republican Party, with Theodore Roosevelt splintering to form the Progressive Party following his failure to secure the nomination for the Republican Party.

== Death ==
Dennis Eldred Alward died on May 22, 1930, in the Henry Ford Hospital at 12:30 pm from a stroke of paralysis, aged 71.
