= R. S. Hatcher =

Robert Stockwell Hatcher
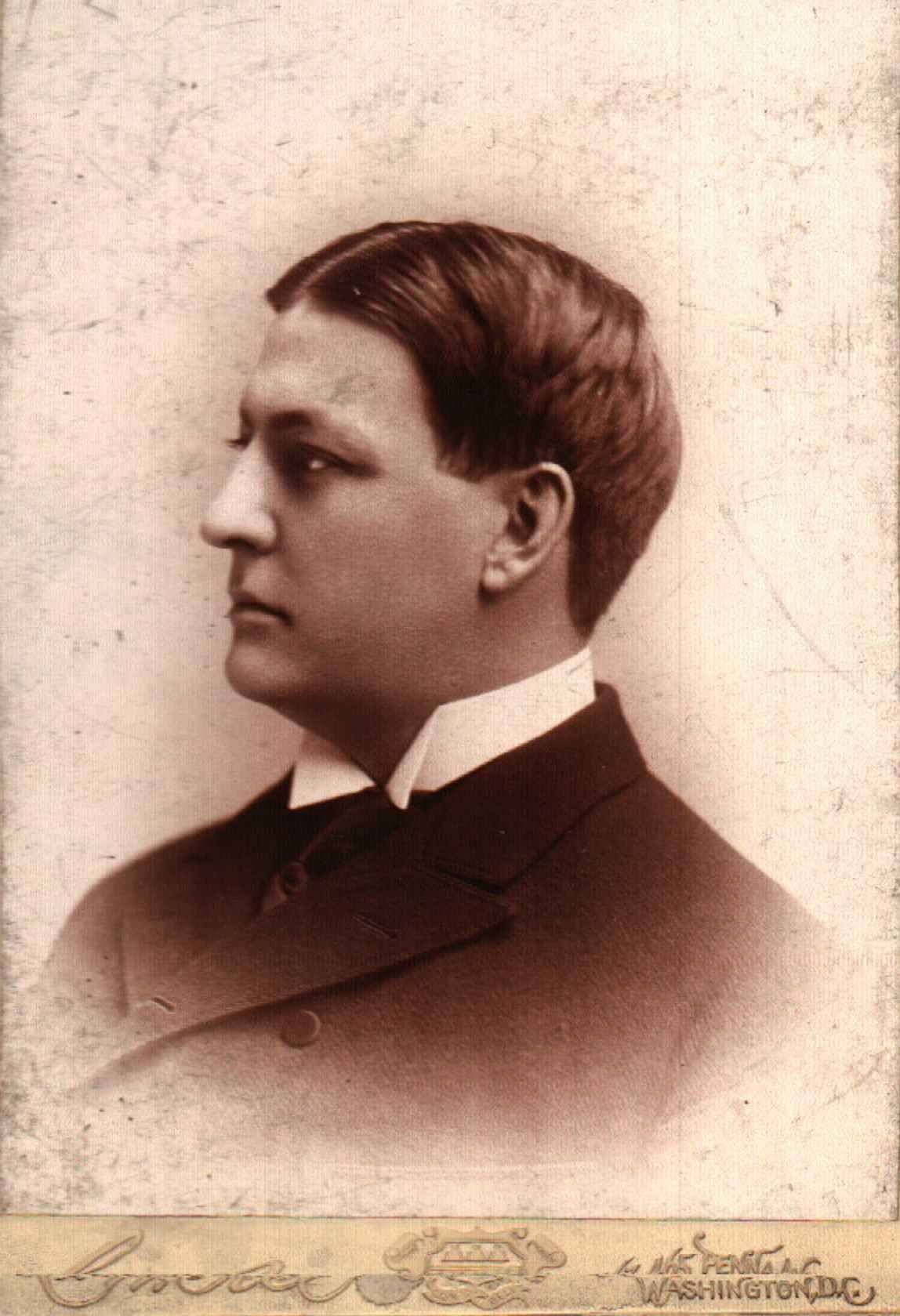

Reading Clerk of the United States House of Representatives
- In office 1895–1897
- Served with: E. L. Lampson (1895–1897)
- Preceded by: James C. Broadwell
- Succeeded by: Dennis E. Alward

Personal details
- Born: February 15, 1865 Lafayette, Indiana, US
- Died: September 14, 1903 (aged 38) St Louis, Missouri, US
- Party: Republican
- Spouse: Georgia Stockton
- Education: George Washington University

Robert Stockwell Hatcher (February 15, 1865 – September 14, 1903) was an American government official, lawyer, and historian who served as the reading clerk of the United States House of Representatives during the 54th United States Congress from 1895 to 1897.

== Personal life ==
Robert Stockwell Hatcher was born on February 15, 1865, in Lafayette, Indiana, to a prominent local and wealthy family. This enabled him to spend much of his youth abroad, studying in various European countries, including Italy, France, and Germany. Throughout this period, Hatcher became fluent in the respective languages of these countries.

Hatcher remained abroad until the death of his mother, Sarah Early Hatcher, in 1883, studying at Columbia College (now George Washington University). He was admitted to the bar two years later, in his hometown of Lafayette in 1885.

Following the death of Hatcher's father, he inherited $250,000, making Hatcher a wealthy man for his time. During Hatcher's earlier years abroad, he utilized large sums of money to amass a private collection of books and artifacts, squandering much of the inherited wealth.

On April 22, 1889, Hatcher married Georgia Stockton. Stockton later became instrumental in establishing The General de Lafayette Chapter of the Daughters of the American Revolution, serving as the regent of the chapter. Stockton died in Chicago in 1903.

During his life, Hatcher served as an honorary vice-president of the Indiana Society of the Sons of the American Revolution and additionally as a member of the Huguenot Society of America.

== Career ==
Hatcher began his public service as the reading clerk for the Indiana State Senate. Subsequently, the Indiana Republican delegation in the United States House of Representatives nominated him as their next reading clerk.

On December 16, his appointment as the House's reading clerk was confirmed by the Speaker of the United States House of Representatives Thomas Brackett Reed. In that role, he served concurrently with former Ohio lieutenant governor Elbert L. Lampson, who had been appointed one day earlier.

In 1899, Hatcher was appointed by the United States Secretary of the Interior as assistant chief of division in the general land office. In the same year, he was appointed by the United States Secretary of War as a "translator of languages for the War Department in the Bureau of Insular Affairs". His assignment in the War Department was later transferred to the office of the Chief Signal Officer of the United States Army.

In 1900, Hatcher was then appointed as part of the United States Commission to the Exposition Universelle (1900).

Prior to his death, Hatcher served as a clerk with the Exposition Company.

== Death ==
Hatcher committed suicide in the Planters Hotel in St. Louis on September 14, 1903, shortly after learning of the death of his wife, Georgia Stockton in Chicago. He was returned to his hometown of Lafayette for burial.

== Works ==
=== Novels ===
- A History of the Family of Early in America: Being the Ancestors and Descendants of Jeremiah Early, who came from the County of Donegal, Ireland, and Settled in what is now Madison County, Virginia, early in the Eighteenth Century, Published 1896
