= Elbert L. Lampson =

American politician (1852–1930)

Elbert Leroy Lampson
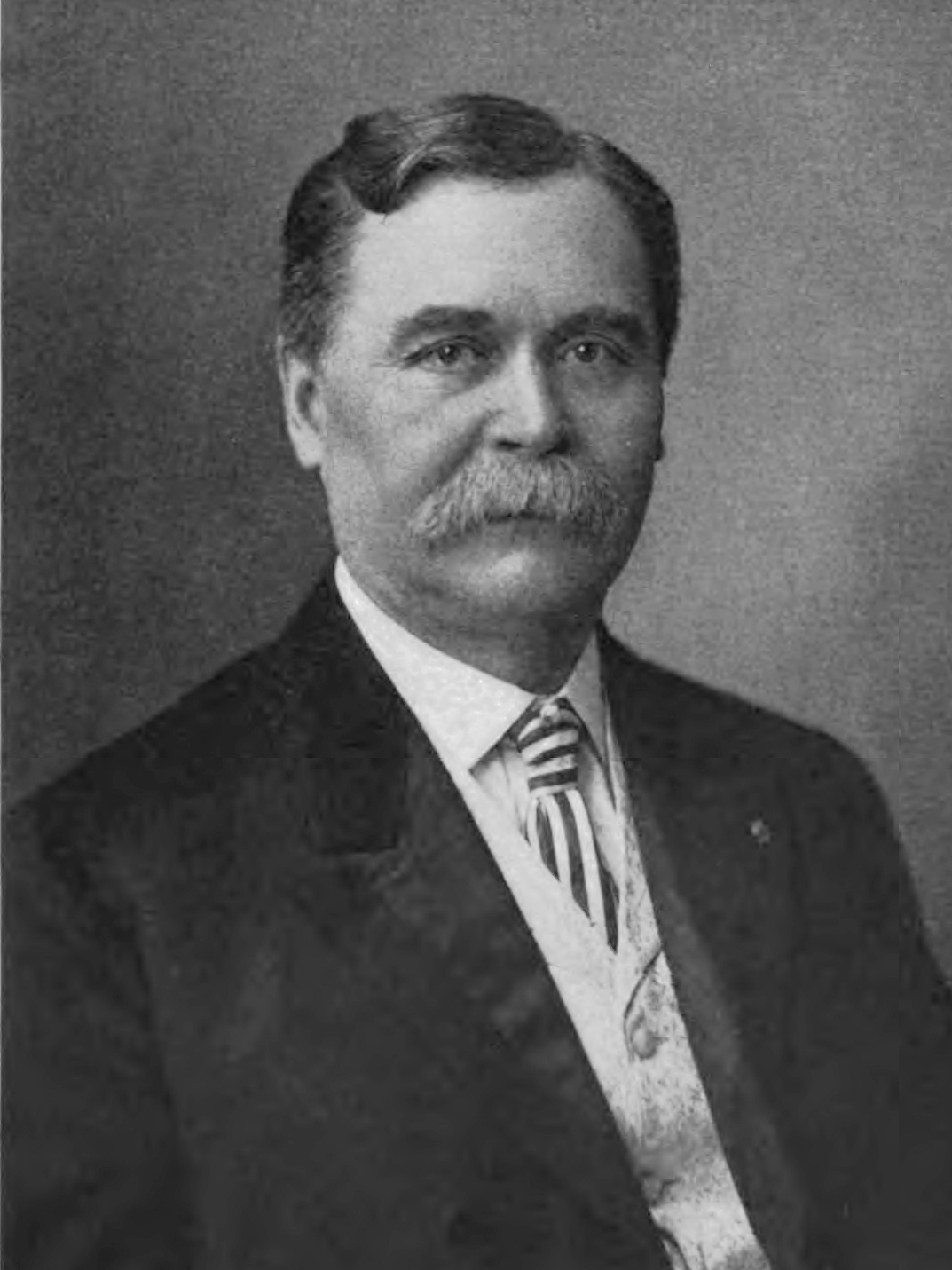

21st Lieutenant Governor of Ohio
- In office January 13, 1890 – January 31, 1890
- Governor: James E. Campbell
- Preceded by: William C. Lyon
- Succeeded by: William V. Marquis

Member of the Ohio Senate from the 24th and 26th district
- In office January 4, 1892 – January 2, 1894
- Preceded by: J. P. Alexander
- Succeeded by: Friend Whittlesey

Member of the Ohio House of Representatives from the Ashtabula County district
- In office January 4, 1886 – January 5, 1890
- Preceded by: Freeman Thorp
- Succeeded by: L. C. Reeve

Reading Clerk of the United States House of Representatives
- In office December 1895 – May 11, 1911
- Served with: R. S. Hatcher (1895–1897); Dennis E. Alward (1897–1911)
- Preceded by: John A. Reeve
- Succeeded by: Patrick Joseph Haltigan

Personal details
- Born: July 30, 1852 Windsor, Ohio, U.S.
- Died: November 18, 1930 (aged 78) Jefferson, Ohio, U.S.
- Resting place: Oakdale Cemetery, Jefferson
- Party: Republican
- Spouse: Mary Luella Hurlburt
- Children: four
- Education: Grand River Institute; University of Michigan Law School
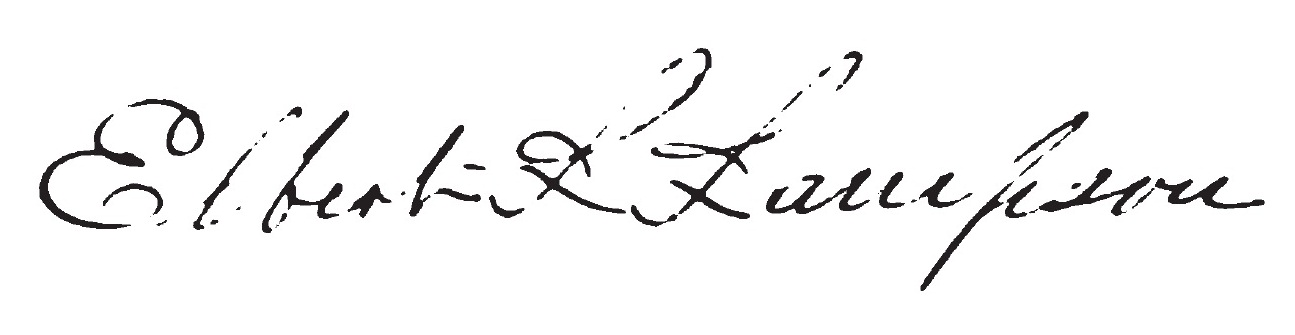
- Signature

Elbert Leroy Lampson (July 30, 1852 – November 18, 1930) was a notable figure in Ohio politics and public affairs during the second half of the nineteenth century. Hailing from Jefferson, Lampson was the 21st lieutenant governor of Ohio and former State Senator. A lawyer by profession, his time had been taken up with a diversity of interests. He was a banker, and for many years was a newspaper publisher.

== Background ==
Lampson was born at Windsor, in Ashtabula County, July 30, 1852. He was of old New England ancestry, the Lampsons settling in Connecticut when they came from England in Colonial times. His grandfather, Ebenezer Lampson, was born in Connecticut in 1754. He served three enlistments as a soldier in the Revolutionary war. In the cemetery at Windsor, Ohio, is a monument erected to the memory of the soldiers of the American Revolution, and one of the names on that monument is Ebenezer Lampson. He came West and settled in the Western Reserve, at Windsor, in 1809. He served as a member of the first grand jury of Ashtabula County in 1811. He was a farmer, and developed a good home, though he lost part of his property through a defective title. He died at Windsor March 12, 1835. His second wife and the grandmother of Elbert L. Lampson bore the maiden name of Martha Griggs. She was born in Connecticut in 1777, and died at Windsor in 1862.

Chester Lampson, son of this Revolutionary soldier, was born at the old homestead in Windsor Township, March 12, 1823, and lived there all his life. He was killed by a falling tree while cutting timber on September 12, 1879. He remained at home and assisted his widowed mother, who received a pension as a Revolutionary widow, and, while starting life in very modest circumstances, he left an estate of 523 acres (2.12 km^{2}) of valuable farm land. He was a staunch Republican, and for a number of years served as township trustee and as a member of the District School Board. As a young man he received military training as a member of the State Militia. Chester Lampson married Emerette A. Griswold, who was born at Windsor in 1829, and died there June 25, 1893. Her father was Nathaniel Griswold, who came to Ohio from New Hampshire. Of the seven children born to Chester Lampson and wife Elbert L. was the oldest; Carrie A. married Eugene C. Hoskins, a farmer at Middlefield, Ohio; Deette H., who died at Mesopotamia, Ohio, married Thomas H. Bell, a retired farmer at Windsor; Addie married William R. Pinks, a farmer at Windsor and former county commissioner of Ashtabula County; Clayton L. was a farmer at Windsor; Ray D. was manager of the Jefferson Gazette; and Edith married Walter Norris, cashier of the Middlefield Banking company at Middlefield, Ohio.

== Career ==
Elbert L. Lampson was reared on his father's farm, and with increasing years he performed a larger share of the duties of the establishment. At the same time he attended the district schools, and when he was seventeen he entered the Grand River Institute at Austinburg, attending one term each school year and then teaching, and in this way he continued until he graduated with the Bachelor of Science degree in 1875. About that time he married, and continued teaching and also began the study of law at Jefferson under the late Congressman Northway. In 1876 he became a student in the law department at the University of Michigan, and was graduated Bachelor of Laws in 1878, and admitted to the Ohio bar the same year. Mr. Lampson then engaged in private practice at Jefferson, and was an active member of the bar until 1883. Since that year other interests have served to deflect him largely from the legal profession.

In 1883 Mr. Lampson bought the Jefferson Gazette, and was editor and publisher of that Republican newspaper until about 1900. Sometime afterward the ownership and management of the Gazette were transferred to a new firm, consisting of E.C. Lampson, son of Elbert L., and R.D. Lampson, brother of Elbert L. Mr. Lampson was vice president of the Jefferson Banking company and chairman of its discount committee. Through his private business interests had been woven a thread of public service, portions of which had demanded much of his time and energies. From 1877 to 1885 he served as county school examiner of Ashtabula County. He also held such offices as township trustee, president of the Board of Education, justice of the peace and treasurer of the Ashtabula County Agricultural Society. He was a delegate to the Republican National Convention at Chicago in 1884, being secretary of the Ohio delegation and a member of the Blaine Conference Committee. In 1885 he was elected to represent Ashtabula County in the General Assembly of Ohio, and was reelected in 1887. In 1888 he was chosen speaker of the Ohio House of Representatives, and during the two sessions he presided the only appeal, taken from his decisions was sustained in his favor.

In 1907, Lampson privately funded the creation of a Civic Forum Library in Jefferson, established in an unused reading room above the offices of the Jefferson Gazette. This was intended to house political pamphlets and congressional memorabilia he had accumulated during his service as reading clerk, particularly handbills from the Blaine and McKinley campaigns and annotated copies of congressional transcripts. Although the collection was catalogued by local volunteers, the library closed within two years.

== Politics ==
In the Republican State Convention of 1889 Mr. Lampson was nominated for lieutenant-governor, taking second place on the ticket headed by Governor J.B. Foraker. That was a notable campaign in Ohio State politics. Governor Foraker was defeated by James E. Campbell of Columbus, but the rest of the Republican ticket was elected, Mr. Lampson having a plurality of twenty-two votes. However, he filled the office of lieutenant-governor only eighteen days. The Democrats held control of the Senate by a majority of one, and this majority unseated him and gave the office to his opponent.

Mr. Lampson served as permanent chairman of the Republican State Convention at Dayton in 1888. In 1891 he was elected to the State Senate to represent the Twenty-fourth and Twenty-sixth districts, including Ashtabula, Lake, Geauga, Portage and Summit counties, and in January, 1892, he was chosen president pro tem of the Senate. He twice voted for John Sherman for the United States Senate. In December, 1895, Mr. Lampson was appointed reading clerk of the National House of Representatives, and during the sessions of United States Congress he was on duty at Washington and held the position continuously for nearly sixteen years, until May 11, 1911. In 1912 Mr. Lampson was a prominent member of the Constitutional Convention of Ohio. He was parliamentarian of the Republican National Convention at Chicago in 1912. Under the auspices of the National Republican Committee he has been a speaker in five national campaigns, those in which the Republican candidates for president were Blaine, McKinley, Roosevelt, Taft and Harding. He had spoken in twelve different states, and in the campaign of 1892 he delivered over thirty speeches in New York and Connecticut.

Mr. Lampson was a trustee of the Congregational Church of Jefferson, and fraternally affiliated with Tuscan Lodge No. 342, Free and Accepted Masons, at Jefferson; Jefferson Chapter No. 141, Royal Arch Masons, and Conneaut Commandery, Knights Templar, at Conneaut. He was a member of the Ashtabula County Bar Association and the Jefferson Chamber of Commerce. He had a number of business interests, including real estate in Ashtabula, and one of the residences in Jefferson was the home of his family, located at the corner of Chestnut and Ashtabula streets. He was one of the organizers of the Ohio Society of the Sons of the American Revolution.

== Marriage and children ==
On August 5, 1875, at Hartsgrove, Ohio, Mr. Lampson married Miss Mary L. Hurlburt, daughter of Edward G. and Jane (Babcock) Hurlburt, now deceased. Her father was a farmer at Hartsgrove, and for twelve years was county commissioner of Ashtabula County. Mrs. Lampson also attended Grand River Institute at Austinburg, and it was there that they began the friendship which ripened into marriage. Four children were born to Mr. and Mrs. Lampson. Edward C. was the successor of his father as editor of the Jefferson Gazette. The son Lawrence V., who was a literary graduate of Oberlin College, spent ten years as a teacher in the Central High School at Washington, D.C., and lived in that city a representative of the Mutual Life Insurance Company of New York. Lillian D., living with her parents, was the widow of Gould R. Anthony, who died as the result of hardships endured while a soldier in the Spanish–American War. The youngest child, Clara May, was a graduate of Oberlin College and married James L. Pauley, a dentist at Mason City, Iowa.

Political offices
Preceded by William C. Lyon	Lieutenant Governor of Ohio; 1890	Succeeded by William V. Marquis
