= Forrest Cemetery Chapel and Comfort Station =

Historic site in Etowah County, Alabama

- U.S. National Register of Historic Places
- U.S. Historic district
- Alabama Register of Landmarks and Heritage
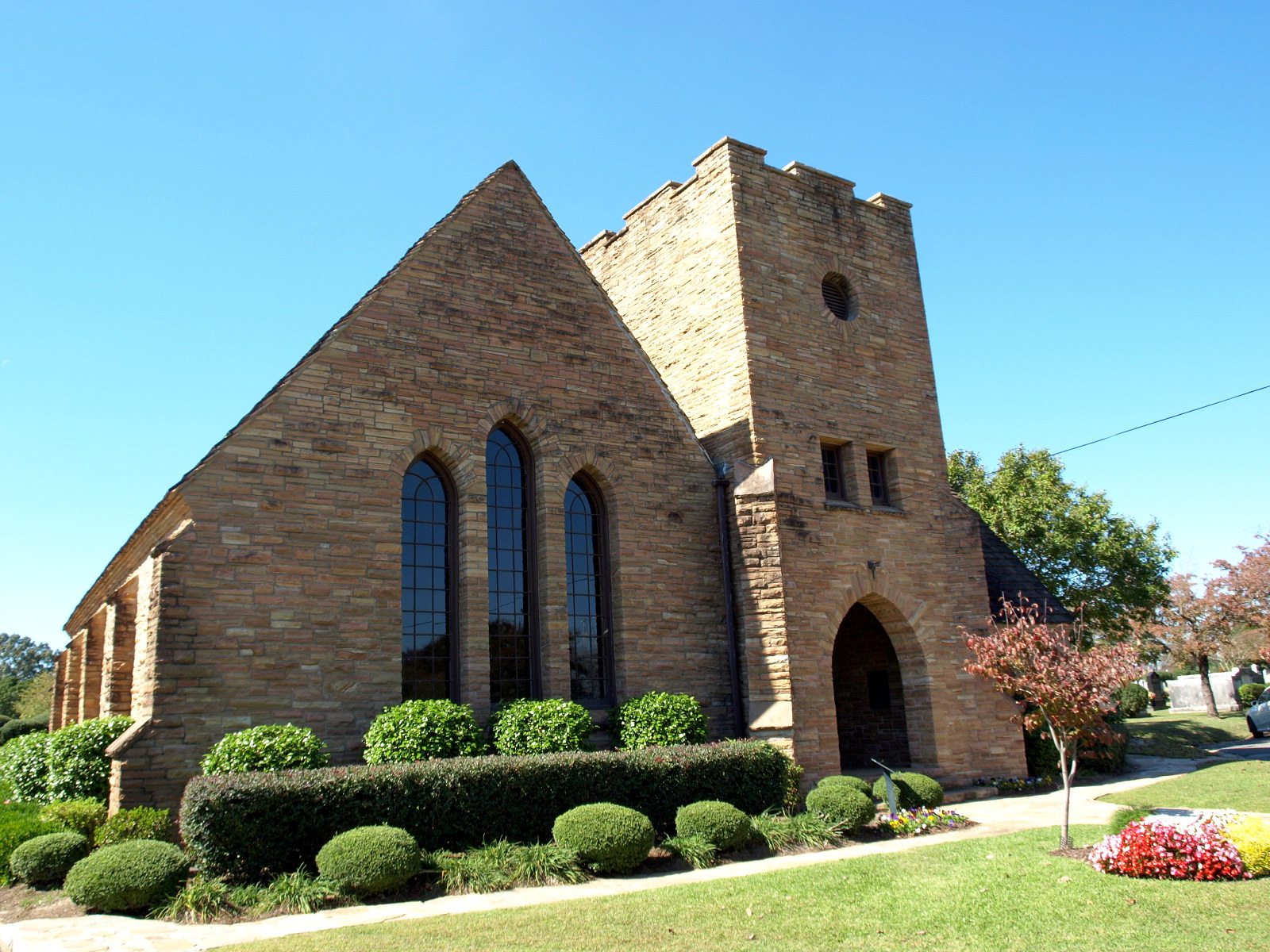
- The chapel in October 2014

- Location within Alabama Location within the United States
- Location: 1100 S. 15th St., Gadsden, Alabama
- Coordinates: 34°0′41″N 86°1′34″W
- Area: less than one acre
- Built: 1935
- Architect: Paul W. Hofferbert
- Architectural style: Late Gothic Revival
- NRHP reference No.: 92001069

Significant dates
- Added to NRHP: September 3, 1992
- Designated ARLH: May 23, 1988

The Forrest Cemetery Chapel and Comfort Station (also known as the Ruth Cross Memorial Chapel) are historic structures in Gadsden, Alabama, United States. The buildings were listed on the Alabama Register of Landmarks and Heritage in 1988 and the National Register of Historic Places in 1992.

== History ==
The chapel, comfort station, and cemetery gates were built in 1935 by workers from the Works Progress Administration, and designed by local architect Paul W. Hofferbert, who also designed the Legion Park Bowl. The chapel is designed in Gothic Revival style, with a steeply pitched gable with three lancet arched windows and a square tower with lancet arch opening for the entrance. The front gate columns and wall are connected to a hipped roof comfort building, which originally housed restrooms, but is now used for storage. All three are constructed of rough-cut sandstone blocks quarried from nearby Lookout Mountain.
