= Adelbert Ford =

American psychologist

Adelbert Ford (April 23, 1890 – April 1976) was an American psychologist who looked at the role of our senses in learning, as well as how distractions interact with this process.

== Life and career ==
Ford was born and raised in Michigan. He completed his undergraduate and master's degree at the University of Michigan. After spending a year teaching, Ford decided to return to school to pursue his interest in psychology. He spoke with Professor Walter Pillsbury at the University of Michigan, and although Pillsbury discouraged this "impractical career choice" he accepted Ford into the program. Ford's curriculum consisted of a year of experimental psychology, a year of general biology, and a year of college mathematics, with a continued emphasis on philosophy. Pillsbury held him to a high standard, and expected a straight-A report. When he completed his third year of schooling, World War I began and he enlisted in the Navy. After two years of service he returned to the University of Michigan in 1920 to finish his undergraduate studies.

After a short teaching position at Drake University, Ford returned to his Alma mater to attain his doctoral degree under Professor Pillsbury. He completed his dissertation in 1926, "Attention-Automization: An Investigation of the Transition Nature of Mind", investigating the effects of a distraction on the efficiency of problems done without disruption of the temporal order. Results included:

1. the initial reaction is longer than other reactions with continuous stimuli from the environment
2. more errors are done in the beginning half of a homogeneous period
3. new integration of behavior had evidence of general motor tones
4. vaso-motor concomitant show effects as the work continues under constant stimuli and
5. fast workers get automatization and have quick recovery after noise, while slow workers recovery more gradually.

After attaining his doctoral degree, Ford took over teaching a class for Pillsbury after Pillsbury abruptly left academia. Over time, Ford began to offer courses on the central nervous system and mental processes. He had a particular interest in applied psychology and offered courses on salesmanship as well as the math of applied psychology.

In 1931, Ford left Michigan to take over as the head of the psychology department at Lehigh University in Pennsylvania where he remained till his retirement in 1955. During this time he took some time off to serve in World War II as a research psychologist with the University of California's War Research division. After retiring, Ford moved to San Diego to work with the United States Navy Electronic Laboratory.

== Contributions to the field of psychology ==
It was Ford's belief that experimental psychology ought to be a "study of human and animal behavior with its attributes, variations, and determinates".

He was appointed the Chairman of the Department of Psychology at Lehigh University in 1931.

Ford's most famous published work, "Eye movements during simulated radar search.", was co-authored with Carroll White in 1960. In this journal they examined the electrical method of the electro-oculogram (EOG), a device used to record eye movement. They collected information to see the pattern of search, spatial distributions, and duration of fixation on one object. In 1954, Ford also published "Bioelectrical potentials and mental effort: II. Frontal lobe effect.", examining electroencephalography potentials that were recorded while resting compared to subjects engaging in mental arithmetic. Results indicate mental work increases integrated frontal potentials. He also published several books including Group Experiments in Elementary Psychology and Instructor's Manual for Group Experiments in Elementary Psychology, text books for elementary psychology students outlining the basic structure of experiments. He focused on the nervous system, sensation of temperature, Weber's law, perception, and attention.
