= William V. Marquis =

American politician

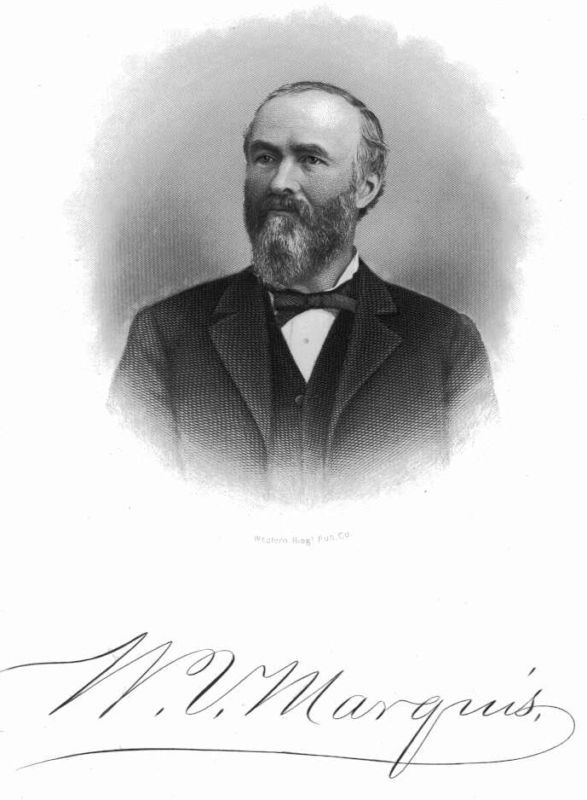

Lieutenant Governor of Ohio
- In office 1890–1892
- Governor: James E. Campbell

Personal details
- Born: May 1, 1828; Mt. Vernon, Ohio, U.S.
- Died: December 17, 1899 (aged 71)
- Spouse: Annie M. Sterritt (m. 1860; died 1868)

William Vance Marquis (May 1, 1828 – December 17, 1899) was an American politician who served as the 22nd lieutenant governor of Ohio from 1890 to 1892 under Governor James E. Campbell.

== Biography ==
Marquis was born at Mt. Vernon, Ohio May 1, 1828. He was moved to Bellefontaine, Ohio at age five. He was in merchandising. He worked at his father's store until it closed in 1848. On November 12, 1860, Marquis was married to Annie M. Sterritt, of Logan County, Ohio,

== Career ==
He was named postmaster of Bellefontaine in 1853 by President Pierce, serving until 1861. 1862–1870 he was in partnership as a hardware merchant, and continued alone after that. Along with William Lawrence, he organized the Bellefontaine National Bank in 1871. Marquis was a delegate to the 1876 Democratic National Convention, (St. Louis). He was nominated in 1878 for the 4th Congressional District, but lost to J. Warren Keifer. In the 1889 election for Lieutenant Governor, Republican Elbert L. Lampson defeated Democrat Marquis by a margin of 375,090 to 375, 068. Lampson was unseated after serving eighteen days, when the Democratic Ohio State Senate seated Marquis in his place.

== Death ==
His wife, Annie, died in August 1868.

Political offices
Preceded by Elbert L. Lampson	Lieutenant Governor of Ohio; 1890–1892	Succeeded by Andrew L. Harris
