= James E. Campbell =

38th Governor of Ohio

James Edwin Campbell
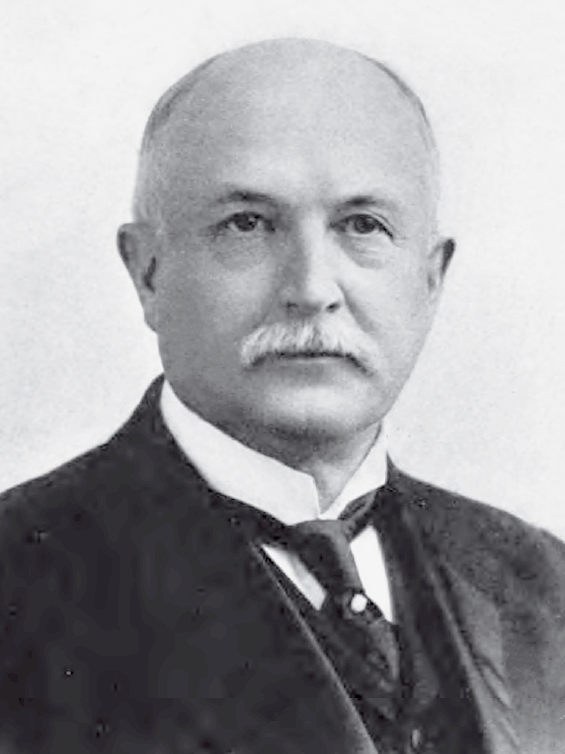

38th Governor of Ohio
- In office January 13, 1890 – January 11, 1892
- Lieutenant: Elbert L. Lampson; William V. Marquis
- Preceded by: Joseph B. Foraker
- Succeeded by: William McKinley

Member of the U.S. House of Representatives from Ohio
- In office June 20, 1884 – March 3, 1889
- Preceded by: Henry Lee Morey
- Succeeded by: Henry Lee Morey
- Constituency: 7th district (1884-1885); 3rd district (1885-1887); 7th district (1887-1889)

Personal details
- Born: July 7, 1843 Middletown, Ohio, U.S.
- Died: December 18, 1924 (aged 81) Columbus, Ohio, U.S.
- Resting place: Green Lawn Cemetery
- Party: Democratic
- Spouse: Maud Elizabeth Owens
- Children: 4
- Education: Miami University

James Edwin Campbell (July 7, 1843 – December 18, 1924) was an American attorney and Democratic politician from Ohio. He served in the United States House of Representatives from 1884 to 1889 and as the 38th governor of Ohio from 1890 to 1892.

== Early life and education ==
Campbell was born in Middletown, Ohio, where he attended the public schools and then Miami University.

== Civil War ==
He served in the Union Army as a member of the Mississippi River Squadron during the Civil War. He was a master's mate on the gunboats Elk and Naiad until his health gave out and he returned home emaciated.

== Early career ==
James Campbell was admitted to the bar in 1865 and began practicing law in Hamilton, Ohio two years later. Campbell was married to Maud Elizabeth Owens of Hamilton, Ohio on January 4, 1870. They had four children.

He was a Republican who voted for Lincoln and Grant for President, and after 1872 became a Democrat.

== Congress ==
After serving as a prosecutor in Butler County, Ohio, from 1876 to 1880, Campbell was elected as a Democrat to the United States House of Representatives twice from Ohio's 7th congressional district (Forty-eighth and Fiftieth Congresses) and once from the third district (Forty-ninth Congress), a seat once held by his uncle Lewis D. Campbell, serving from 1884 to 1889. In the 49th Congress, he was chairman of the House Committee on Alcoholic Liquor Traffic.

== Governor ==
Campbell then was elected to the Ohio governorship, serving from 1890 to 1892. He was an unsuccessful candidate for re-election in 1891, losing to future president William McKinley. During his term as governor, he signed a bill enacting the Australian ballot in Ohio. He called a special session of the General Assembly to remove the corrupt government of the city of Cincinnati. This action cost him the support of Democrats in that part of the state, and prevented his re-election. He was unsuccessful in a third run for governor in 1895.

== Later career ==
Campbell was a trustee of the Ohio State University 1895–1896. Remaining politically active, Campbell was a delegate to the Democratic National Conventions in 1892, 1920, and 1924. He served on the commission to codify the State of Ohio laws from 1908 to 1911.

Campbell was nominated for Congress in 1906, but lost, and was his party's choice for Senator in 1908, but was again defeated. In 1913, Campbell was appointed a trustee of the Ohio Archaeological and Historical Society, and he was elected unanimously by the Board of Trustees as president on September 25, 1918. He served as president until his death.

He resumed the practice of law in Columbus, Ohio after 1892.

He was a Mason, a member of the order of the Elks, the Columbus Club, the Scioto Country Club, the Presbyterian Church, the Grand Army of the Republic, the American Legion, and the Kit Kat Club of Columbus.

== Death ==
James Edwin Campbell died in Columbus in 1924 and is interred in Green Lawn Cemetery.

== Notes ==
U.S. House of Representatives
Preceded by Henry Lee Morey	U.S. Representative from Ohio's 7th congressional district 1884 - 1885	Succeeded by George E. Seney
Preceded by Robert Maynard Murray	U.S. Representative from Ohio's 3rd congressional district 1885 - 1887	Succeeded by Elihu S. Williams
Preceded by George E. Seney	U.S. Representative from Ohio's 7th congressional district 1887 - 1889	Succeeded by Henry Lee Morey
Political offices
Preceded by Joseph B. Foraker	Governor of Ohio; 1890–1892	Succeeded by William McKinley
Party political offices
Preceded by Thomas E. Powell	Democratic Party nominee for Governor of Ohio; 1889, 1891	Succeeded by Lawrence T. Neal
Preceded by Lawrence T. Neal	Democratic Party nominee for Governor of Ohio; 1895	Succeeded by Horace L. Chapman
