= William C. Lyon =

American politician

William Cotter Lyon
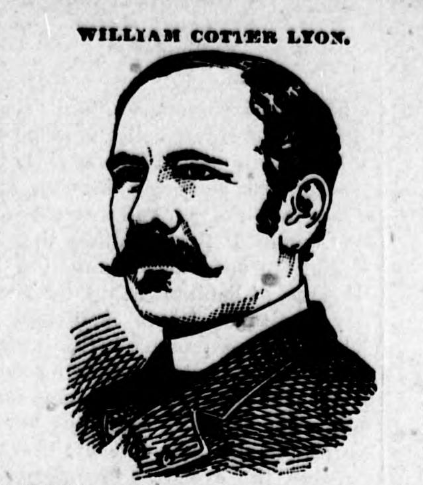

20th Lieutenant Governor of Ohio
- In office January 9, 1888 – January 13, 1890
- Governor: Joseph B. Foraker
- Preceded by: Silas A. Conrad
- Succeeded by: Elbert L. Lampson

Personal details
- Born: July 4, 1841 Homer, Ohio
- Died: September 24, 1908 (aged 67) Ohio
- Resting place: Woodland Cemetery, Xenia, Ohio

William Cotter Lyon (July 7, 1841 – September 24, 1908) was an American Republican politician who served as the 20th lieutenant governor of Ohio from 1888 to 1890 under Governor Joseph B. Foraker.

Lyon was born July, 1841 at Homer Township, Medina County, Ohio. His mother died in Michigan in 1847, and his father was murdered in Putnam County, Ohio in 1853. He was left at age twelve to care for himself and his younger orphan siblings. He learned the shoemaker's trade, educated himself and sometimes attended the Seville Academy. At outbreak of the Insurrection, he enlisted in the Twenty-third Ohio Regiment. He served two years as a private before being made a commissioned officer. Thirteen months before the end of the war, he was captured and imprisoned in a POW camp. After release he was made a captain. After the war he returned to the shoe business in Medina County, and moved to Newark in Licking County in 1870. In 1877, President Rutherford B. Hayes appointed him Postmaster of that city, and he was re-appointed by President Chester A. Arthur. He resigned with the election of Grover Cleveland, but it was not accepted until January 1, 1886. In 1884, he purchased the Newark American. In 1887 he was nominated and elected Ohio Lieutenant Governor. He was not re-nominated in 1889. He died in 1908.

== Notes ==
Political offices
Preceded by Silas A. Conrad	Lieutenant Governor of Ohio; 1888-1890	Succeeded by Elbert L. Lampson
