= Thomas Seay =

American politician (1846–1896)

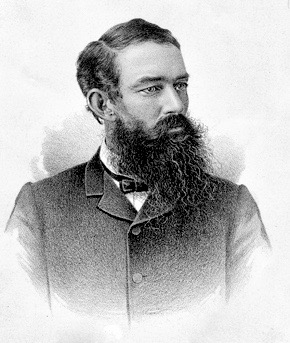

27th Governor of Alabama
- In office December 1, 1886 – December 1, 1890
- Preceded by: Edward A. O'Neal
- Succeeded by: Thomas G. Jones

Personal details
- Born: November 20, 1846 Erie, Alabama
- Died: March 30, 1896 (aged 49) Greensboro, Alabama
- Resting place: Greensboro Cemetery, Greensboro, Alabama
- Party: Democratic

Military service
- Allegiance: Confederate States of America
- Branch/service: Confederate States Army
- Years of service: 1863-1865
- Rank: Sergeant
- Unit: 62nd Alabama Infantry
- Battles/wars: American Civil War

Thomas J. Seay (November 20, 1846 – March 30, 1896) was an American Democratic politician who was the 27th governor of Alabama from 1886 to 1890.

== Early life ==
Thomas Jefferson Seay was born on November 20, 1846, near Erie in present-day Hale County. This area was part of Greene County at the time of his birth to Reuben and Ann McGee Seay. Thomas grew up on a plantation until age twelve, when the family moved to Greensboro, Alabama. There he attended Southern University (Greensboro) until the outbreak of the American Civil War interrupted his studies.

In 1863 Seay enlisted in the Confederate Army and served with his company around Mobile. He was captured at Spanish Fort and Blakeley and imprisoned on Ship Island. After the war, Seay returned to Southern University (Greensboro), graduating in 1867. He then studied law and practiced as a junior member of Coleman and Seay from 1869 to 1885. Seay also engaged in planting.

== Politics ==
Thomas Seay began his political career in 1874 when he ran unsuccessfully for the state senate. He was successful in 1876 and remained in the senate for ten years, serving as president from 1884 to 1886. Seay was elected governor in 1886 and reelected in 1888.

This administration is noteworthy for Seay's success in reducing taxes, increasing social services, and running state government in the black. An advocate for social welfare programs, the central Alabama native supported crucial legislation. Women and children were limited to an eight-hour workday during his administration. Pensions were provided for disabled Confederate veterans and their widows. Seay was also supportive (in the context of late 19th century standards) of measures to improve the rights and education of Alabama's black citizens.

Several new schools were established during Seay's term. Among these were the State Normal School at Troy (now Troy State University) and the State Normal School for Colored Students in Montgomery (now Alabama State University). In Talladega, the Alabama Academy for the Blind was established, removing that responsibility from the Alabama Institute for the Deaf.

Bessemer was founded in 1887, and the iron and steel industry in Jefferson County began to boom soon after. An especially exciting event to occur while Seay was in office was the 1887 visit of President Grover Cleveland to Montgomery.

Other events during Seay's administration were not so joyful. The convict lease system began, and business owners soon realized the opportunity to exploit this workforce. The Hawes Riot occurred in Birmingham; thirteen people died. Evidence of discontent among Alabamians occurred when farmers organized the Farmer's Alliance to draw attention to their problems.

In 1890 Seay was defeated by James M. Pugh in his bid for a U.S. Senate seat. He did not run for office again, although he helped Thomas G. Jones in his campaign for governor against Populist Reuben Kolb.

== Personal ==
Seay married Ellen Smaw of Greene (later Hale) County on July 12, 1875. They had a son and a daughter before her death in 1879. In 1881 he married Clara de Lesdernier, with whom he had four more children. Seay died at 49 on March 30, 1896, in Greensboro.

== Tributes ==
Seay Hall at the Alabama Agricultural and Mechanical University was named for him. The three-story wood frame dormitory burned in 1892.

== Sources ==
- Alabama Department of Archives and History, Public Information Subject Files.
- National Cyclopedia of American Biography.
- Owen, Thomas M. History of Alabama and Dictionary of Alabama Biography, 1921.
- Stewart, John Craig. The Governors of Alabama, 1975.
- Summersell, Charles G. Alabama: A State History, 1955.
- Summersell, Charles G. "The Alabama Governor's Race in 1892." Alabama Review, January 1955.
- alabama.gov

Party political offices
Preceded by Edward A. O'Neal	Democratic nominee for Governor of Alabama; 1886, 1888	Succeeded by Thomas G. Jones
Political offices
Preceded by Edward A. O'Neal	Governor of Alabama; 1886–1890	Succeeded by Thomas G. Jones
