= Barrie (surname) =

Barrie is a surname, and may refer to:

- Alex Barrie (1878–1918), Scottish footballer
- Alhassan Barrie (born 1995), Belgian basketball player
- Alistair Barrie, British comedian, writer and actor
- Amanda Barrie (born 1935), British television and film actress
- Andy Barrie (born 1945), American-Canadian radio personality
- Bailor Barrie (1934–1989), Sierra Leonean businessman, activist and philanthropist
- Barbara Barrie (1931–2026), American actress and author of children's books
- Charles Barrie, 1st Baron Abertay (1875–1940), Scottish businessman and politician
- Chris Barrie (born 1960), British actor and vocal impressionist
- Chris Barrie (admiral) (born 1945), Australian naval officer
- David Barrie (born 1980), Canadian soccer referee
- David Ogilvy Barrie (born 1953), British diplomat, arts administrator, author and campaigner
- Dennis Barrie (born 1947), American museum director
- Doug Barrie (born 1946), Canadian ice hockey player
- Elaine Barrie (1915–2003), American actress
- Emma Barrie (born 2002), Scottish netball player
- Ernest Barrie (born 1955), Scottish convicted murderer
- Erwin S. Barrie (1886–1983), American gallerist
- Francois Barrie (1943 or 1944–2023), Dominican politician
- Frank Barrie (1936–2025), English actor, director and writer
- Fred Barrie, co-author of the Veronica search engine
- George Barrie (1912–2002), American company director and film producer
- George Barrie (footballer) (born 1904), Scottish footballer
- Herbert Barrie (1927–2017), British paediatrician
- Hugh T. Barrie (1860–1922), Scottish businessman and politician
- J. J. Barrie (1933–2026), Canadian songwriter, singer and comedian
- J. M. Barrie (1860–1937), Scottish novelist and dramatist; creator of Peter Pan
- Jim Barrie (1904–1976), Canadian merchant and political figure from Saskatchewan
- John Barrie (actor) (1917–1980), British actor in TV police dramas
- John Barrie (footballer) (1925–2015), Scottish footballer
- John Barrie (snooker player) (1924–1996), English billiards and snooker player
- Judith Barrie (1907–1991), American actress and model
- Ken Barrie (1933–2016), English voice actor and singer
- Len Barrie (born 1969), Canadian ice hockey player
- Lester Barrie (born 1965), American stand-up comedian and actor
- Maggie Barrie (born 1996), Sierra Leonean sprinter
- Mardi Barrie (1930–2004), Scottish artist
- Matt Barrie (businessman) (born 1973), Australian technology entrepreneur
- Matt Barrie (sportscaster), American sportscaster
- Melanie La Barrie (born 1974), Trinidadian actress and singer
- Michael Barrie (born 1946), American screenwriter
- Mohamed Bailor Barrie (1934–1989), businessman in Sierra Leone's diamond trade in the 1970s and 1980s
- Mona Barrie (1909–1964), English actress in Australia and America
- Nigel Barrie (1889–1971), British actor
- Patrick Barrie, British tiddlywinks player
- Prince Barrie (born 1997), Sierra Leonean footballer
- Rob Barrie (1912–1981), Scottish rugby union footballer
- Robert Barrie (1774–1841), British naval officer in the War of 1812
- Robert Barrie (pentathlete) (born 1951), Australian modern pentathlete
- Royden Barrie (1890–1948), British playwright, children's author and lyricist
- Scott Barrie (born 1962), Scottish social worker and politician
- Scott Barrie (filmmaker), Canadian film and television director
- Sebastian Barrie (1970–2025), American football player
- Shirley Barrie (1945–2018), Canadian playwright and writer
- Thomas Barrie (died 1538), English almoner
- Tyson Barrie (born 1991), Canadian ice hockey player
- Wendy Barrie (1912–1978), English actress in British and Hollywood films
- Wendy Barrie-Wilson (born 1954), American stage actress

== See also ==
- Barrié
- Barre (surname)
- Barri (surname)
- Barry (surname)
