= Textile design =

Creation of designs for the manufacturing of woven, knitted or printed fabrics

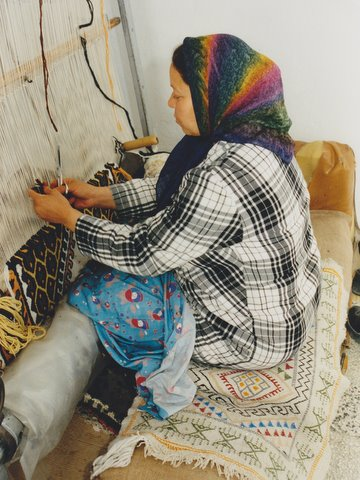
A Tunisian woman weaving on a loom

Textile design, also known as textile geometry, is the creative and technical process by which thread or yarn fibers are interlaced to form a piece of cloth or fabric, which is subsequently printed upon or otherwise adorned. Textile design is further broken down into three major disciplines: printed textile design, woven textile design, and mixed media textile design. Each uses different methods to produce a fabric for variable uses and markets. Textile design as an industry is involved in other disciplines such as fashion, interior design, and fine arts.

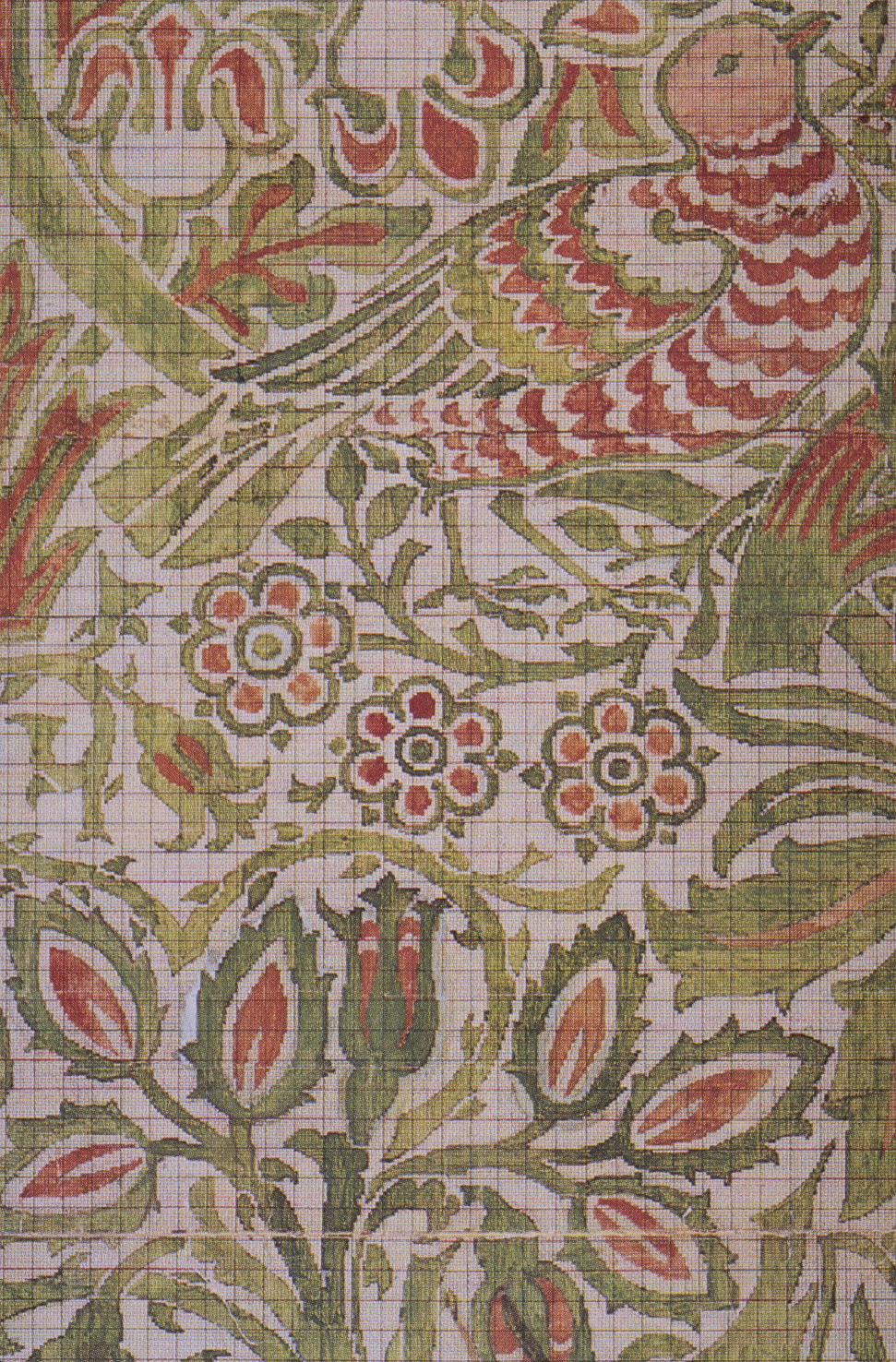
Point paper for Dove and Rose woven double cloth by William Morris, 1879

== Overview ==
Articles produced using textile design include clothing, carpets, drapes, and towels. Textile design requires an understanding of the technical aspects of the production process, as well as the properties of numerous fibers, yarns, and dyes.

== Textile design disciplines ==
=== Printed textile design ===
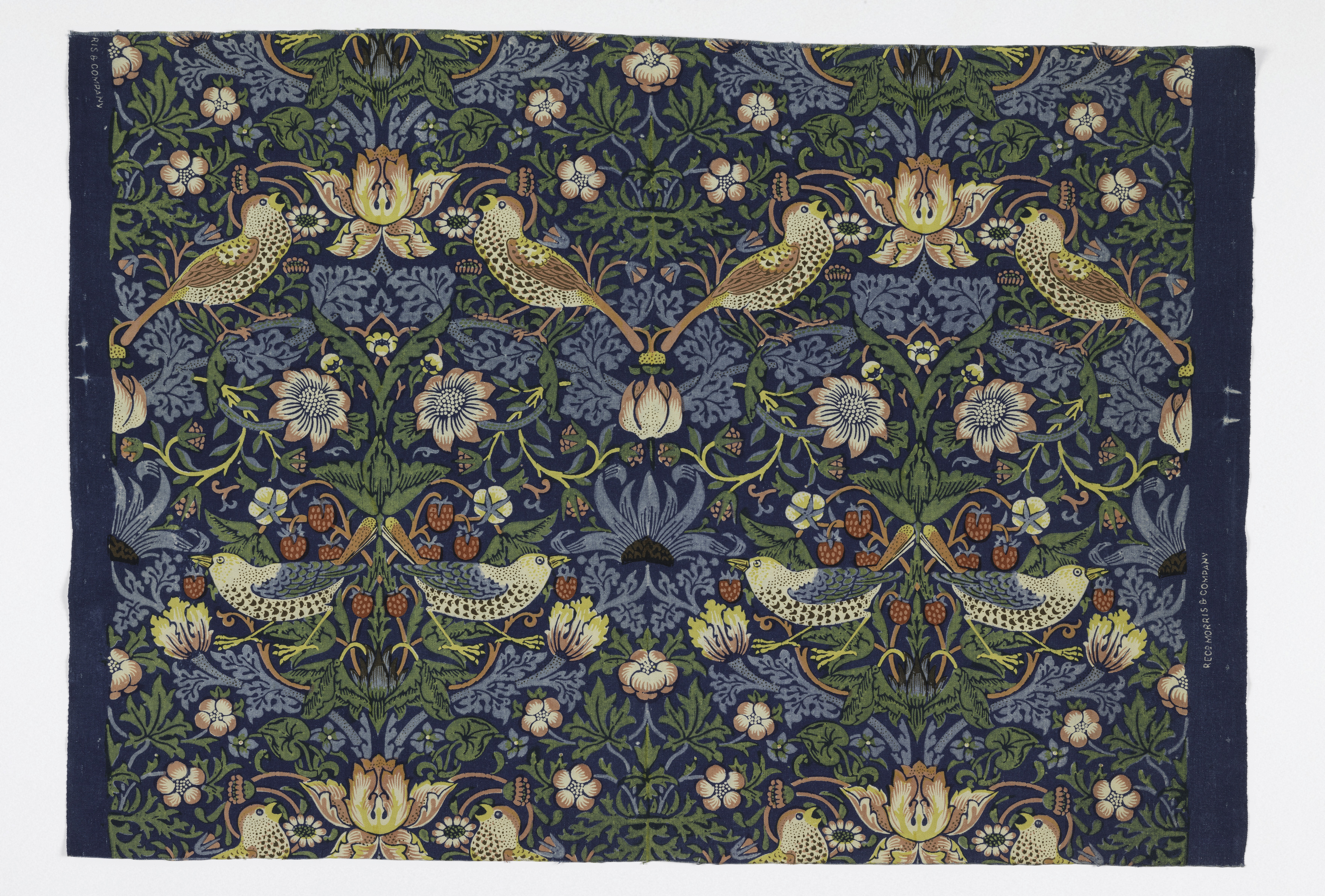
Printed textile design: William Morris, Strawberry Thief, 1883

Printed textile designs are created by using various printing techniques on fabric, cloth, and other materials. Printed textile designers are mainly involved in designing patterns for home interior products like carpets, wallpapers, and ceramics. They also work in the fashion and clothing industries, the paper industry, and in designing stationery and gift wrap.

There are numerous established printed styles and designs that can be broken down into four major categories: floral, geometric, world cultures, and conversational. Floral designs include flowers, plants, or other botanical elements. Geometric designs feature elements, both inorganic and abstract, such as tessellations. World culture designs may be traced to a specific geographic, ethnic, or anthropological source. Finally, conversational designs are designs that fit less easily into the other categories; they may be described as presenting "imagery that references popular icons of a particular period or season, or which is unique and challenges our perceptions in some way." Each category contains subcategories, which include more specific individual styles and designs.

Moreover, different fabrics, like silk and wool, require different types of dye. Other protein-based fabrics require acidic dyes, whereas synthetic fabrics require specialized dispersed dyes.

The advent of computer-aided design software, such as Adobe Photoshop and Illustrator, has allowed each discipline of textile design to evolve and innovate new practices and processes but has most influenced the production of printed textile designs. Digital tools have influenced the process of creating repeating patterns or motifs, or repeats. Repeats are used to create patterns both visible and invisible to the eye: geometric patterns are intended to depict clear, intentional patterns, whereas floral or organic designs are intended to create unbroken repeats that are ideally undetectable. Digital tools have also aided in making patterns by decreasing the amount of an effect known as "tracking", in which the eye is inadvertently drawn to parts of textiles that expose the discontinuity of the textile and reveal its pattern. These tools, alongside the innovation of digital inkjet printing, have allowed the textile printing process to become faster, more scalable, and more sustainable.

=== Woven textile design ===
Woven textile design originates from the practice of weaving, which produces fabric by interlacing a vertical yarn (warp) and a horizontal yarn (weft), most often at right angles. Woven textile designs are created by various types of looms and are now predominantly produced using a mechanized or computerized jacquard loom.

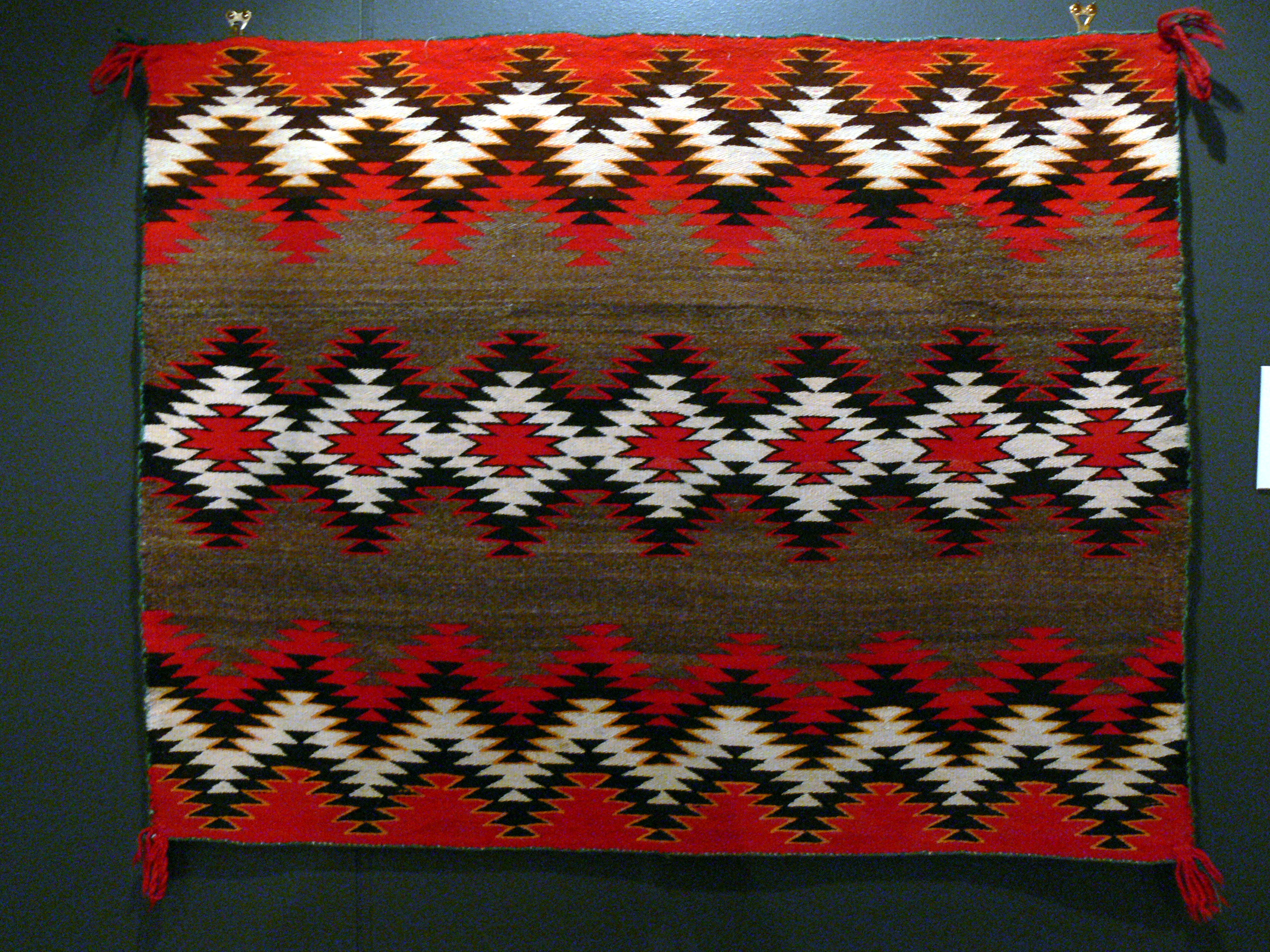
Woven textile design: A woven Navajo saddle blanket from the Philbrook Museum in Tulsa, Oklahoma

Designs within the context of weaving are created using various types of yarns, using variance in texture, size, and color to construct a stylized patterned or monochromatic fabric. There is a large range of yarn types available to the designer, including but not limited to cotton, twill, linen, and synthetic fibers. To produce the woven fabric, the designer first delineates and visualizes the sequence of threading, which is traditionally drawn out on graph paper known as point paper.

The designer also will choose a weave structure that governs the aesthetic design that will be produced. The most common process is a plain weave, in which the yarns interlace in an alternating, tight formation, producing a strong and flexible multi-use fabric. Twill weaves, which are also common, alternatively use diagonal lines created by floating the warp or the weft to the left or the right. This process creates a softer fabric favored by designers in the fashion and clothing design industries. Common, recognizable twill styles include patterns like houndstooth or Herringbone.

Beyond weave structure, color is another dominant aspect in woven textile design. Typically, designers choose two or more contrasting colors that will be woven into patterns based on a chosen threading sequence. Color is also dependent on the size of the yarn: fine yarns will produce a fabric that may change colors when it receives light from different angles, whereas larger yarns will generally produce a more monochromatic surface.

=== Mixed media textile design ===
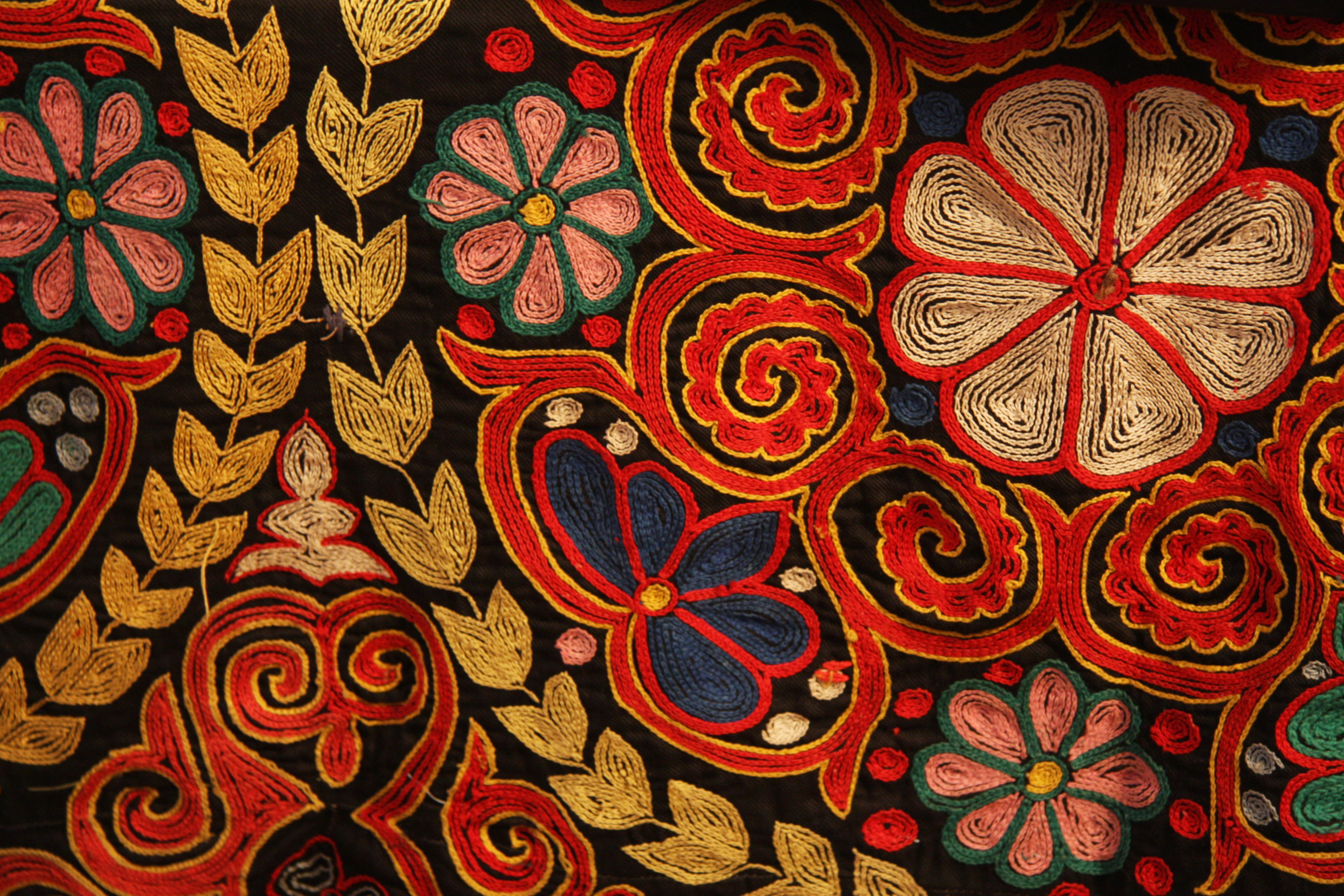
Mixed media textile design: An embroidered Kazakh, chain stitched rug

Mixed media textile designs are produced using embroidery or other various fabric manipulation processes such as pleating, appliqué, quilting, and laser cutting.

Embroidery is traditionally performed by hand, applying myriad stitches of thread to construct designs and patterns on the textile surface. Similar to printed textile design, embroidery affords the designer artistic and aesthetic control. Typical stitches include but are not limited to the cross stitch, the chain stitch, and couching. Although industrial and mechanized embroidery has become the standard, hand stitching still remains a fixture for fine arts textiles.

Quilting is traditionally used to enhance the insulation and warmth of a textile. It also provides the designer with the opportunity to apply aesthetic properties. Most commonly, quilts feature geometric and collage designs formed from various textiles of different textures and colors. Quilting also frequently employs the use of recycled scrap or heirloom fabrics. Quilts are also often used as a medium for an artist to depict a personal or communal narrative: for example, the Hmong people have a tradition of creating story quilts or cloths illustrating their experiences with immigration to the United States from Eastern and Southeast Asia.

== Environmental impact ==
The practice and industry of textile design present environmental concerns. From the production of cloth from raw material to dyeing and finishing, and the ultimate disposal of products, each step of the process produces environmental impacts. They have been further exacerbated with the emergence of fast fashion and other modern industrial practices.

Predominantly, these environmental impacts stem from the heavy use of hazardous chemicals involved in the textile creation process which must be properly disposed of. Other considerations involve the amount of waste created by the disposal of textile design products and the reclamation and reuse of recyclable textiles. The Environmental Protection Agency reported that over 15 million tons of textile waste is created annually. This consists of some 5% of all municipal waste generated. Only 15% of that waste is recovered and reused.

The existence and awareness of the negative environmental impacts of textile production has resulted in the emergence new technologies and practices. Textile designs involving the use of synthetic dyes and materials can result in harmful effects on the environment. This has caused a shift towards using natural dyes or materials and research towards other mediums that result in less harm to the environment. This research includes testing new ways to collect natural resources and how these natural resources work with other materials.

Electronic textiles involve items of clothing with electronic devices or technology woven into the fabric, such as heaters, lights, or sensors. These textiles can potentially have additional harmful environmental effects, such as producing electronic waste. Because of this, these textiles are often made by manufacturers with sustainability in mind. These new approaches to textile design attempt to lessen the negative environmental impact of these textiles.

These concerns have led to the birth of sustainable textile design movements and the practice of ecological design within the field. For instance, London's Royal Society of the Arts hosts design competitions that compel all entrants to center their design and manufacturing methods around sustainable practices and materials.

== Textile design in different cultures ==
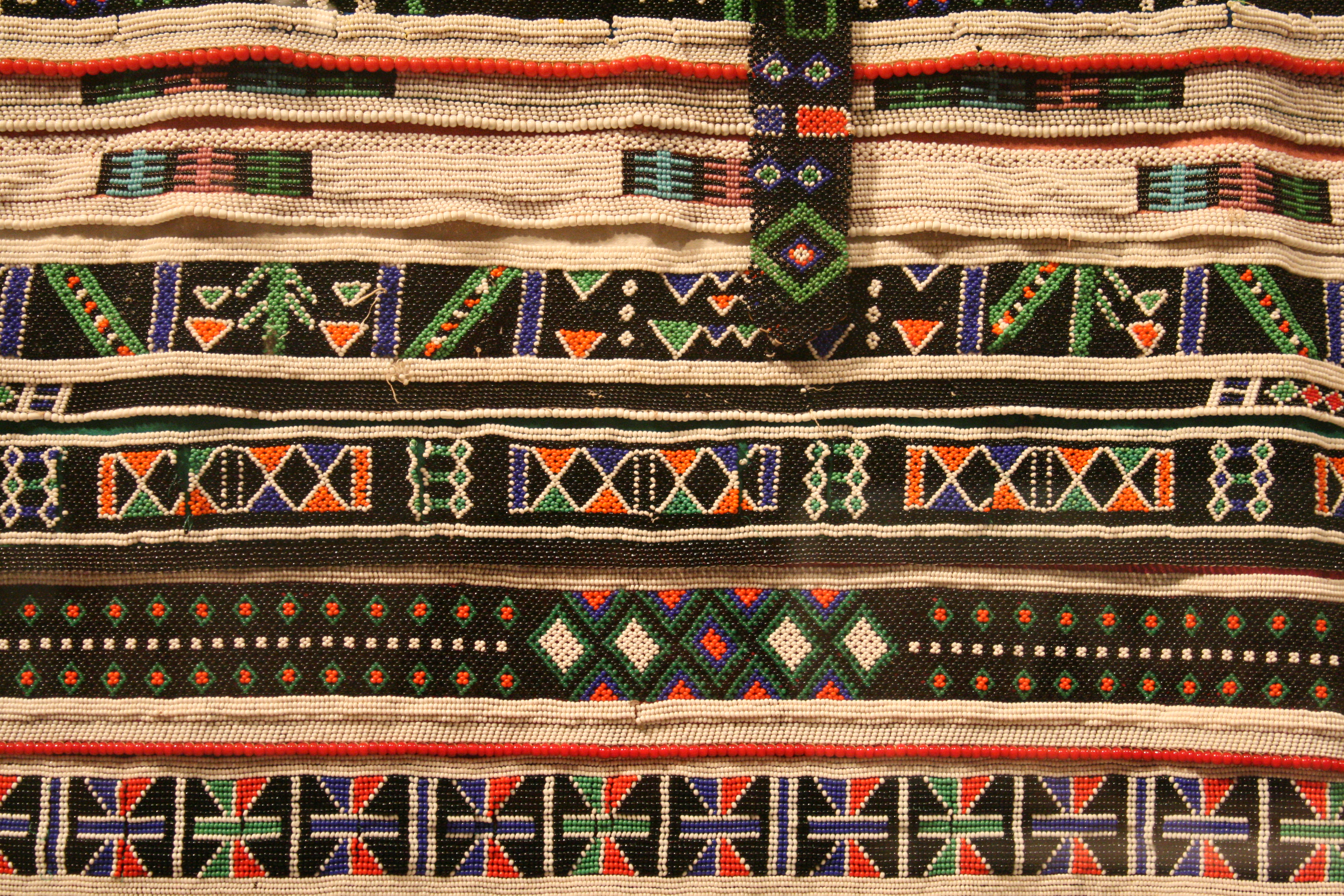
Strip-woven textile design: African fabric

Textile patterns, designs, weaving methods, and cultural significance vary across the world. African countries use textiles as a form of cultural expression and way of life. They use textiles to liven up the interior of a space or accentuate and decorate the body of an individual. The textile designs of African cultures involve the process of strip-woven fibers that can repeat a pattern or vary from strip to strip.

== History ==
The history of textile design dates back thousands of years. Due to the decomposition of textile fibers, early examples of textile design are rare. However, some of the oldest known and preserved examples of textiles were discovered in the form of nets and basketry, dating from Neolithic cultures in 5000 BCE. When trade networks formed in European countries, textiles like silk, wool, cotton, and flax fibers became valuable commodities. Many early cultures including Egyptian, Chinese, African, and Peruvian practiced early weaving techniques. One of the oldest examples of textile design was found in an ancient Siberian tomb in 1947. The tomb was said to be that of a prince aging back to 464 AD, making the tomb and all of its contents over 2,500 years old. The rug, known as the Pazyryk rug, was preserved inside ice and is detailed with elaborate designs of deer and men riding on horseback. The designs are similar to present-day Anatolian and Persian rugs that apply the directly proportional Ghiordes knot in their weaving. The Pazyryk rug is currently displayed at the Hermitage Museum located in St. Petersburg, Russia.

== See also ==
- Clothing technology
- Fashion design
- Textile manufacturing
