= Barre (given name) =

Barre or Barré is a male given name. Notable people with the surname include:

- Barre Adan Shire Hiiraale, Somali politician
- Barré Charles Roberts (1789–1810), English antiquarian
- Barre Phillips (1934–2024), American jazz and free improvisation bassist
- Barré Lyndon (1896–1972), British playwright and screenwriter
- Barre Seid (born 1932), American businessman from Chicago

== See also ==
- La Barre
- Barre (surname)
- Barre (disambiguation)
