= Government College of Engineering & Textile Technology, Serampore =

Engineering College in West Bengal

Coordinates: 22°45′02.82″N 88°21′03.89″E

- Type: Public; Engineering
- Established: 30 November 1908; 117 years ago
- Parent institution: College of Textile Technology (1908)
- Affiliations: Maulana Abul Kalam Azad University of Technology
- Officer in charge: S. S. Mahesh
- Location: 12, William Carry Road, Serampore-712201, West Bengal, India
- Website: www.gcetts.org

The Government College of Engineering & Textile Technology, Serampore (GCETTS) is an engineering college in Serampore, West Bengal, India.

== History ==
A textile industry was established in India in the middle of 19th century. The need for trained technical personnel to drive that was felt in Bengal which led to the establishment of the institution. The Government College of Engineering and Textile Technology Serampore was established in 1908 as the Government Central Weaving Institute with a two-year certificate course in weaving in a rented house in Serampore. In 1938, a three-year diploma course in textile technology was started which was upgraded to degree course in 1957 under the affiliation of Calcutta University.

The institution was renamed as College of Textile Technology Serampore, which was changed to its present name in 2005. From the year 2009 B.Tech in Apparel Production Management and M.Tech in Chemical Processing of Textile was started. The institution is currently affiliated with Maulana Abul Kalam Azad University of Technology.

== Academic programmes ==
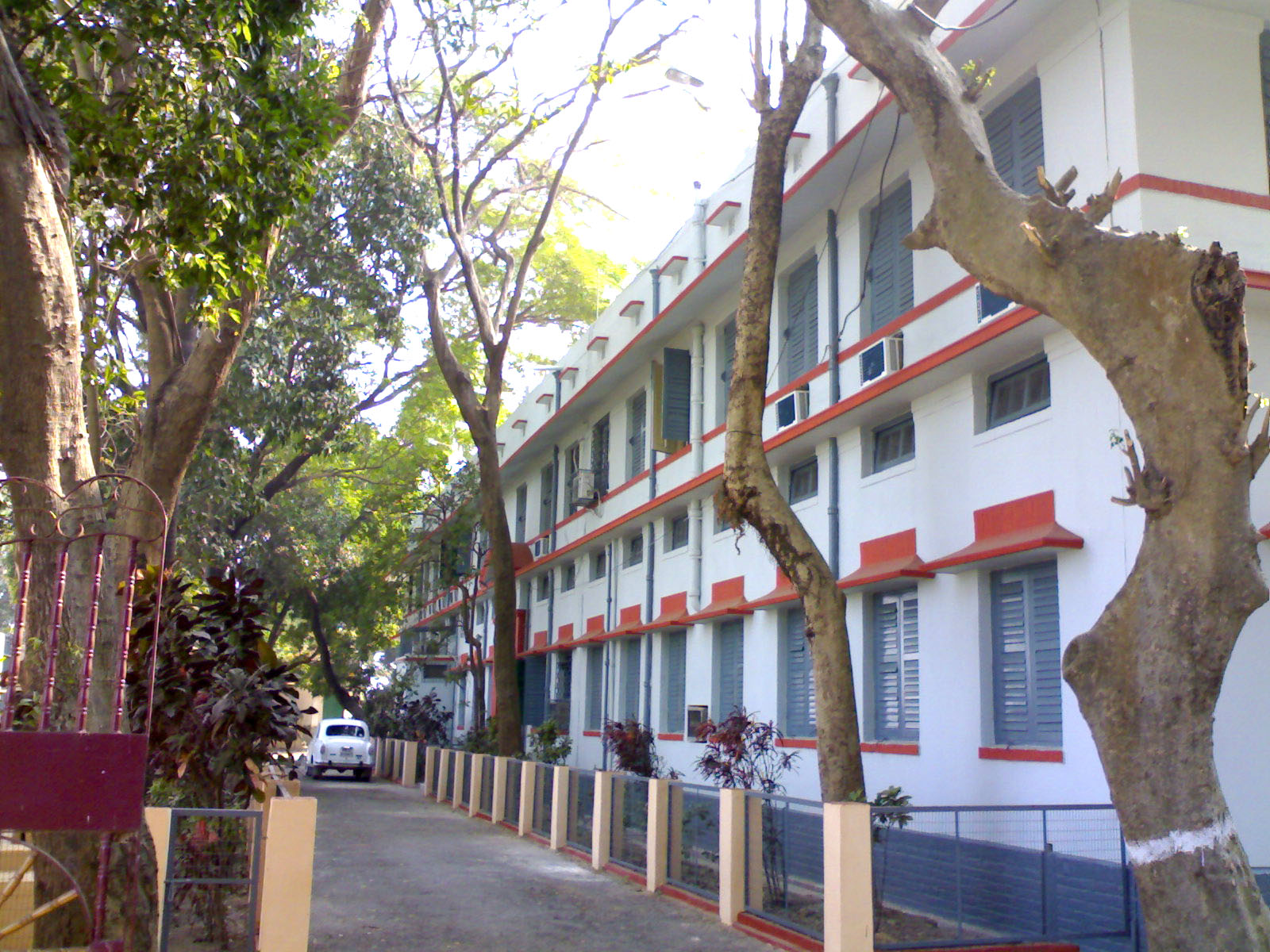
Administrative building

Undergraduate and post graduate courses are:

- Bachelor of Technology in Textile Technology
- Bachelor of Technology in Computer Science and Engineering
- Bachelor of Technology in Information Technology
- Bachelor of Technology in Apparel Production and Management
- Master of Technology in Textile Technology
- Master of Technology in Chemical Processing Of Textiles

== Department of Textile Technology ==
This is the oldest department of the institution and has contributed significantly to the textile industry in India by producing trained technical manpower. Earlier affiliated with University of Calcutta, the department has long been associated with textile education and training in eastern India.

The department offers undergraduate and postgraduate programmes in Textile Technology. It is equipped with laboratory facilities and machinery for practical training and research in spinning, weaving, textile processing, textile testing and clothing technology.

== Department of Computer Science and Engineering & Information Technology ==
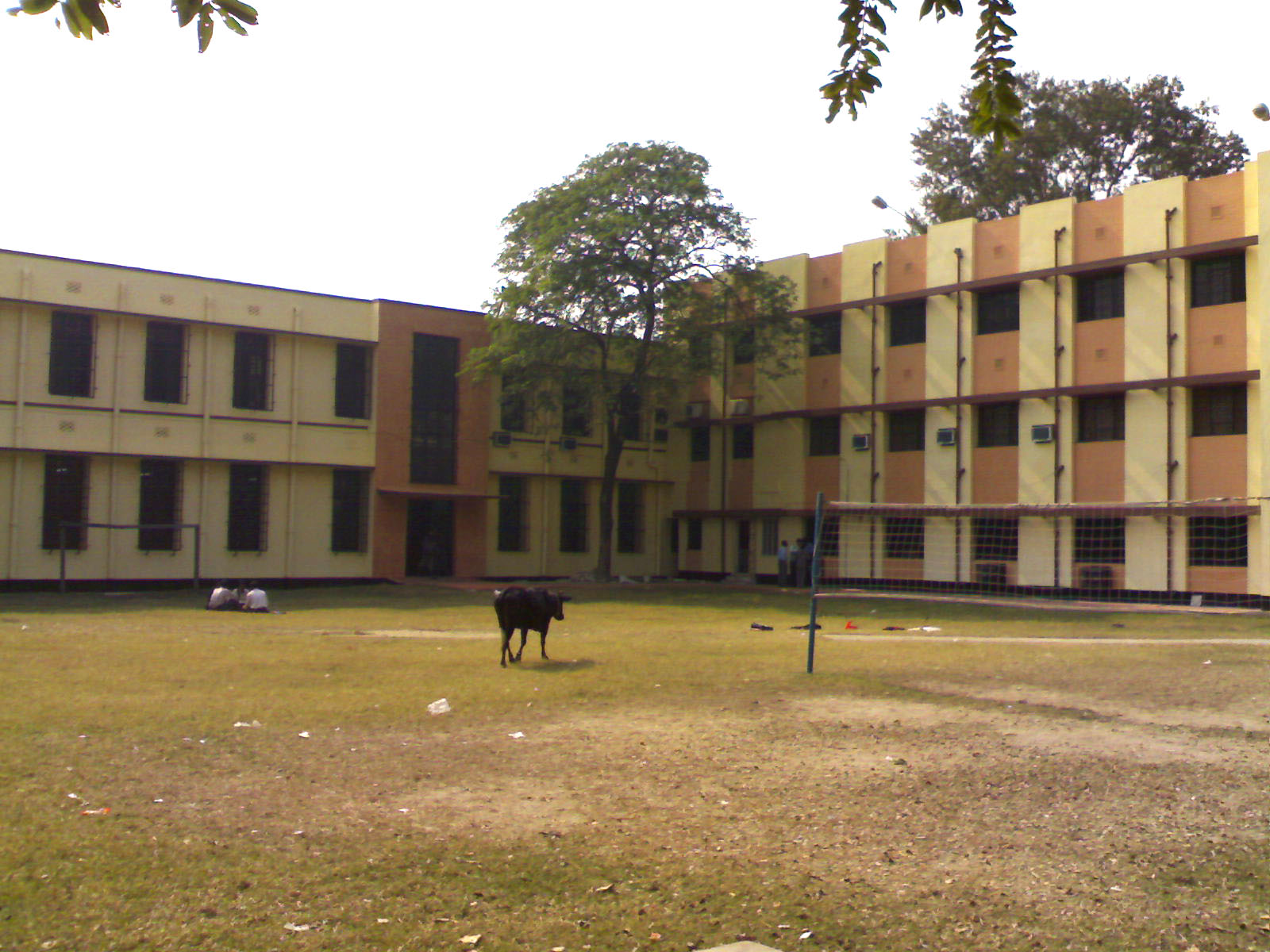
CSE and IT department buildings

The Computer Science and Engineering Department and Information Technology Department were formed in 2001 and 2000 respectively. Due to the formation of West Bengal University of Technology, the Serampore Textile College incorporated in its curriculum the CSE and IT departments and changed its name to the present name. The CSE and IT departments share all the labs as the subjects are very similar.

Laboratories include electronics, microprocessors, communication engineering, software labs (operating systems, database management systems (DBMS), media, control and systems simulation), basic programming (subjects like Java, World Wide Web, Artificial Intelligence). The physics lab, chemistry lab, and mechanical workshop and electrical workshop, are shared among all departments.

== Alumni and professional affiliation ==
The institution has a strong alumni network, with graduates contributing significantly to academia, research, administration, and the textile industry in India and abroad. Alumni of the institution remain actively engaged through academic collaboration, professional interaction, mentorship, and participation in institutional development activities.

One of the professional alumni bodies associated with the institution is TANTU, which serves as a platform for professional networking, technical exchange, and alumni engagement in the textile sector.

== Gallery ==
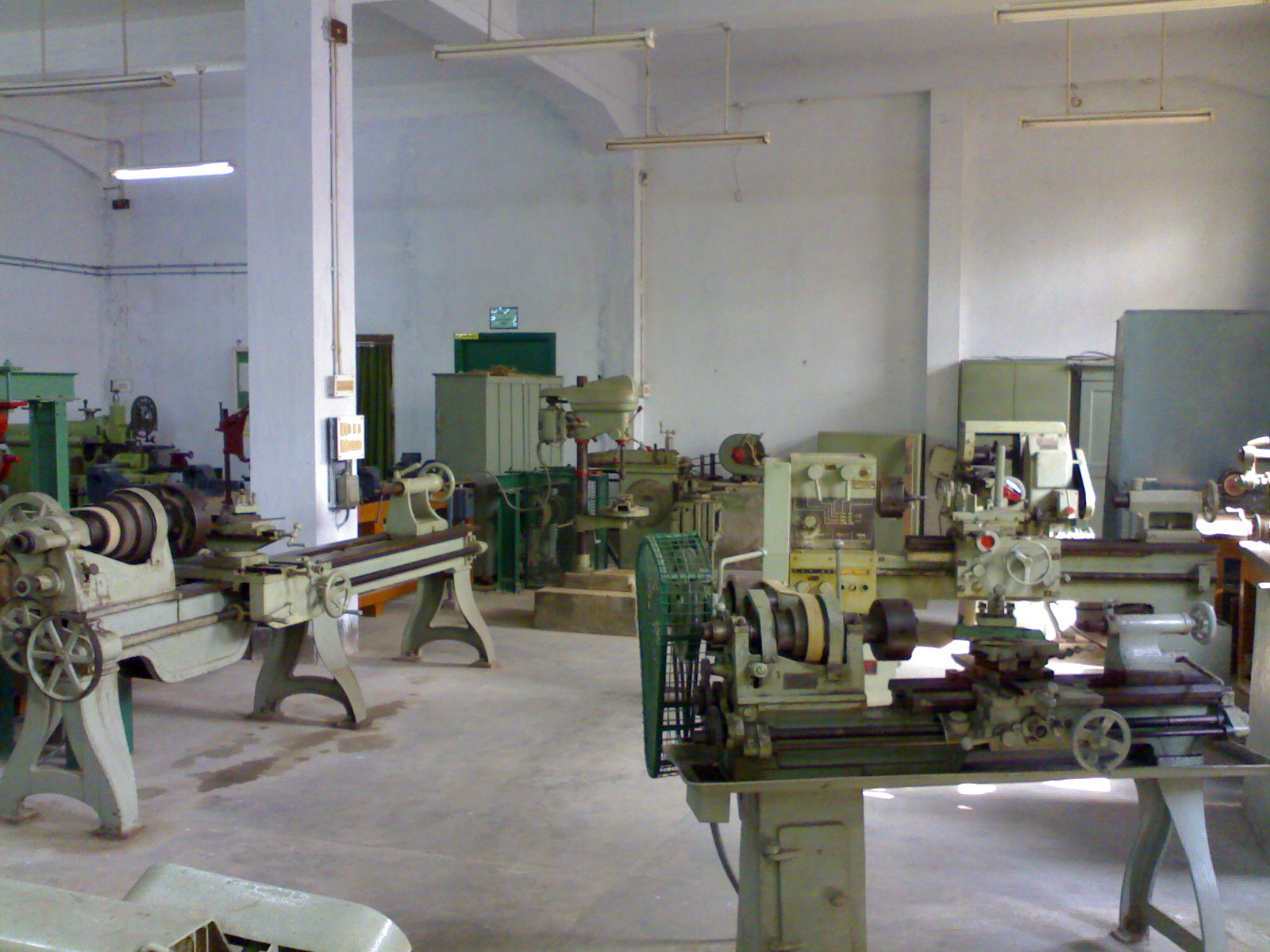
Mechanical workshop

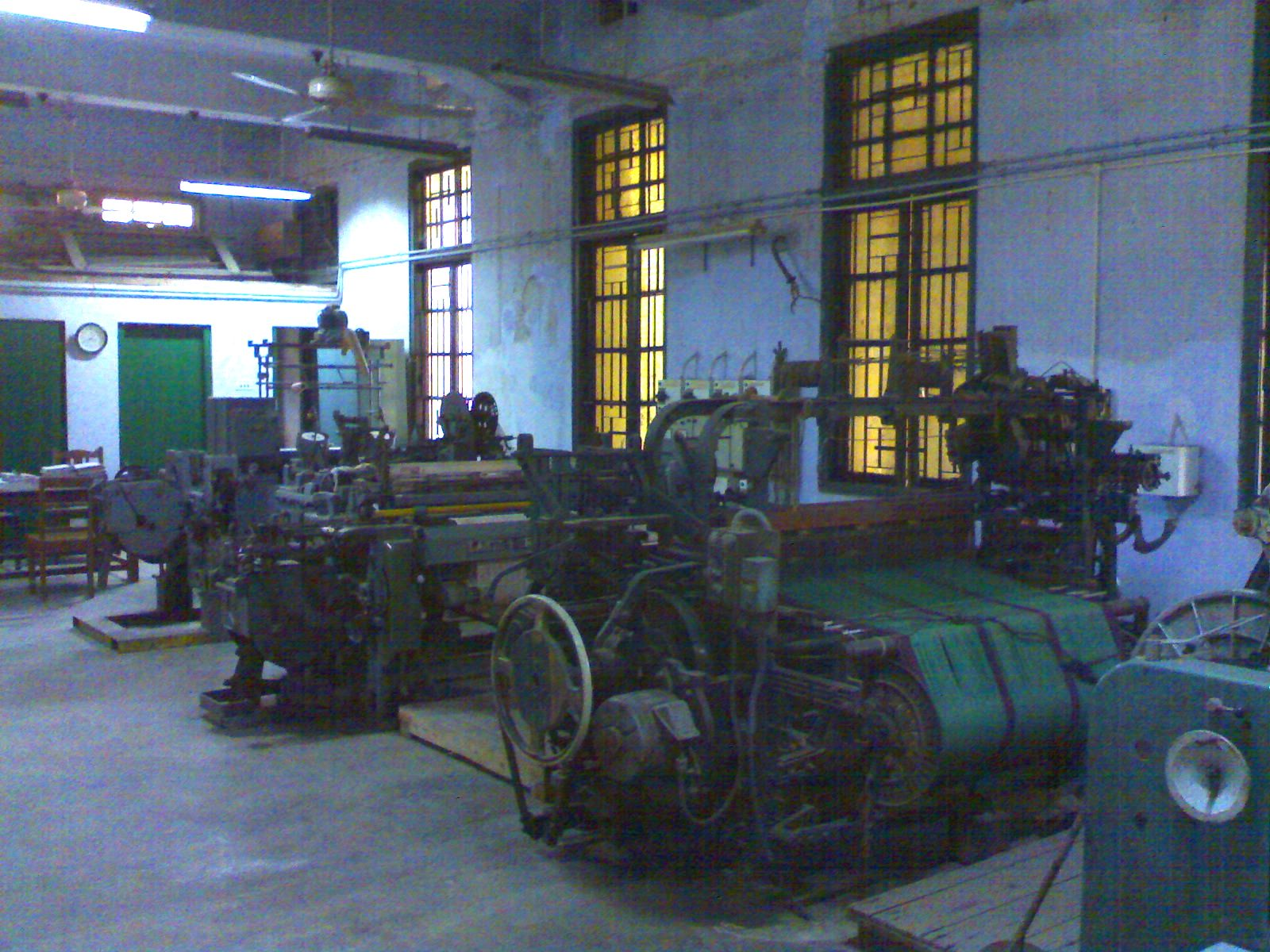
Weaving lab

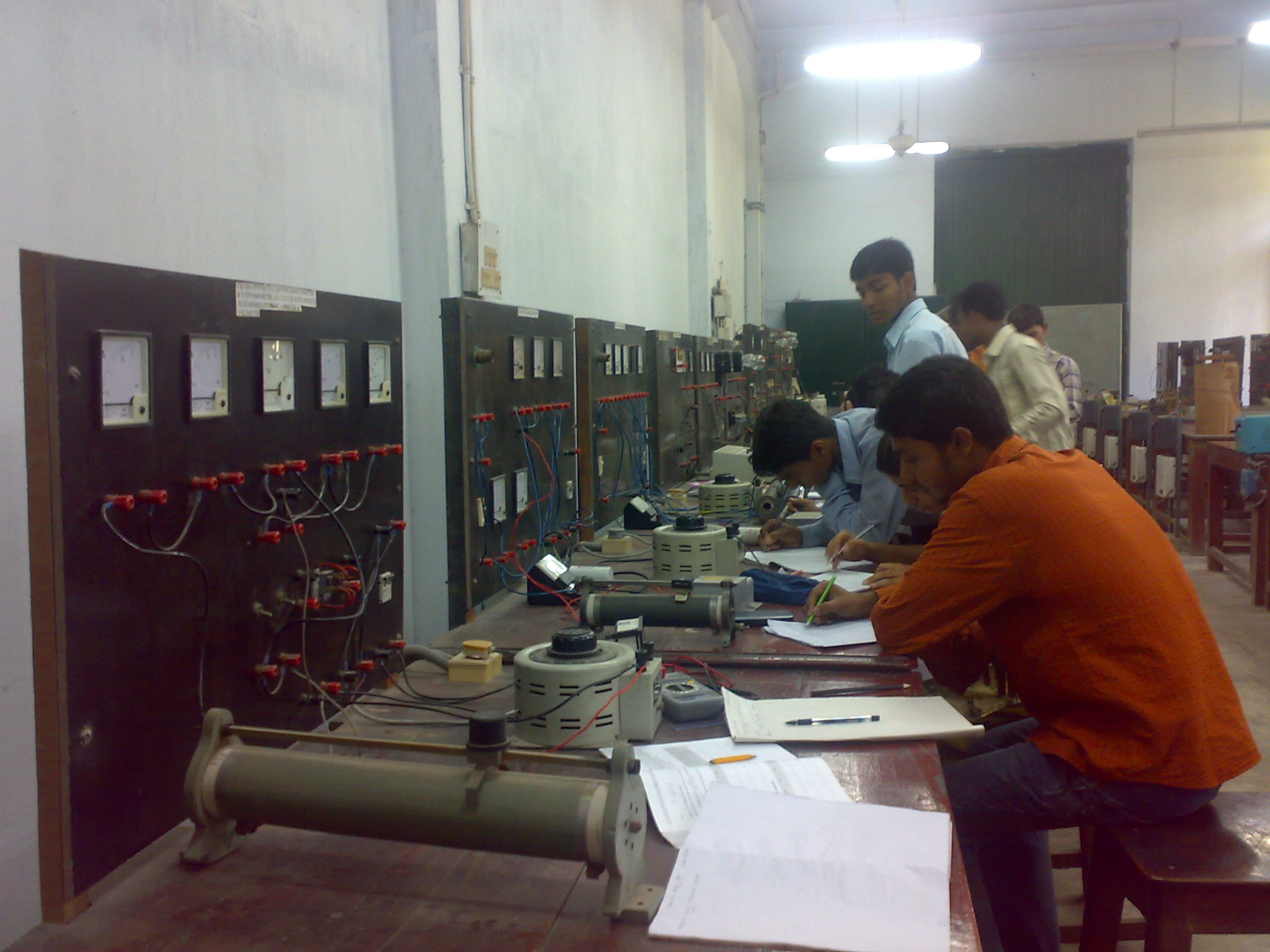
Electrical lab

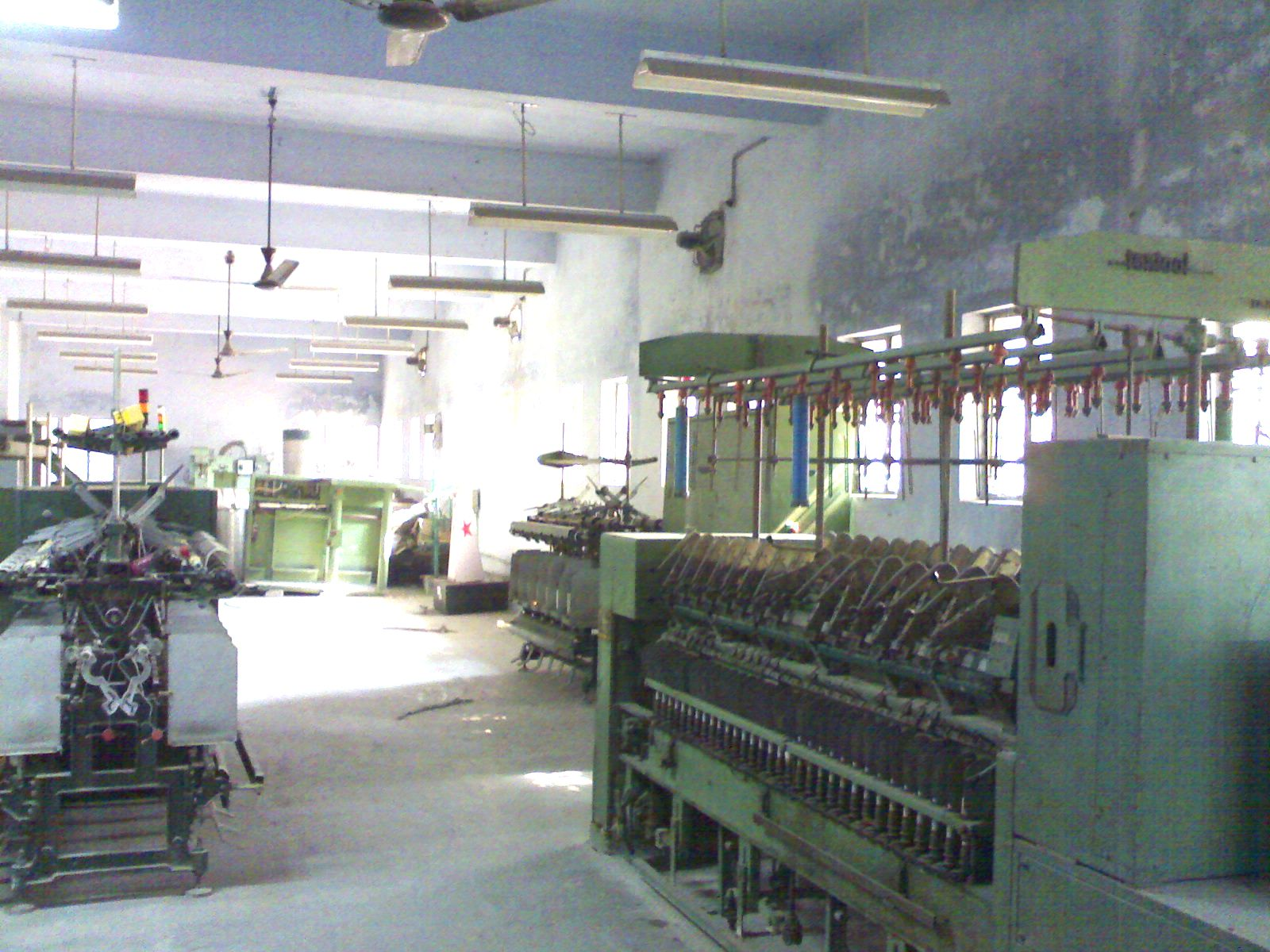
Spinning lab

== See also ==
- Government College of Engineering & Textile Technology, Berhampore
- National Institute of Fashion Technology Kolkata
