= Textile testing =

Process of measuring the properties and performance of textiles

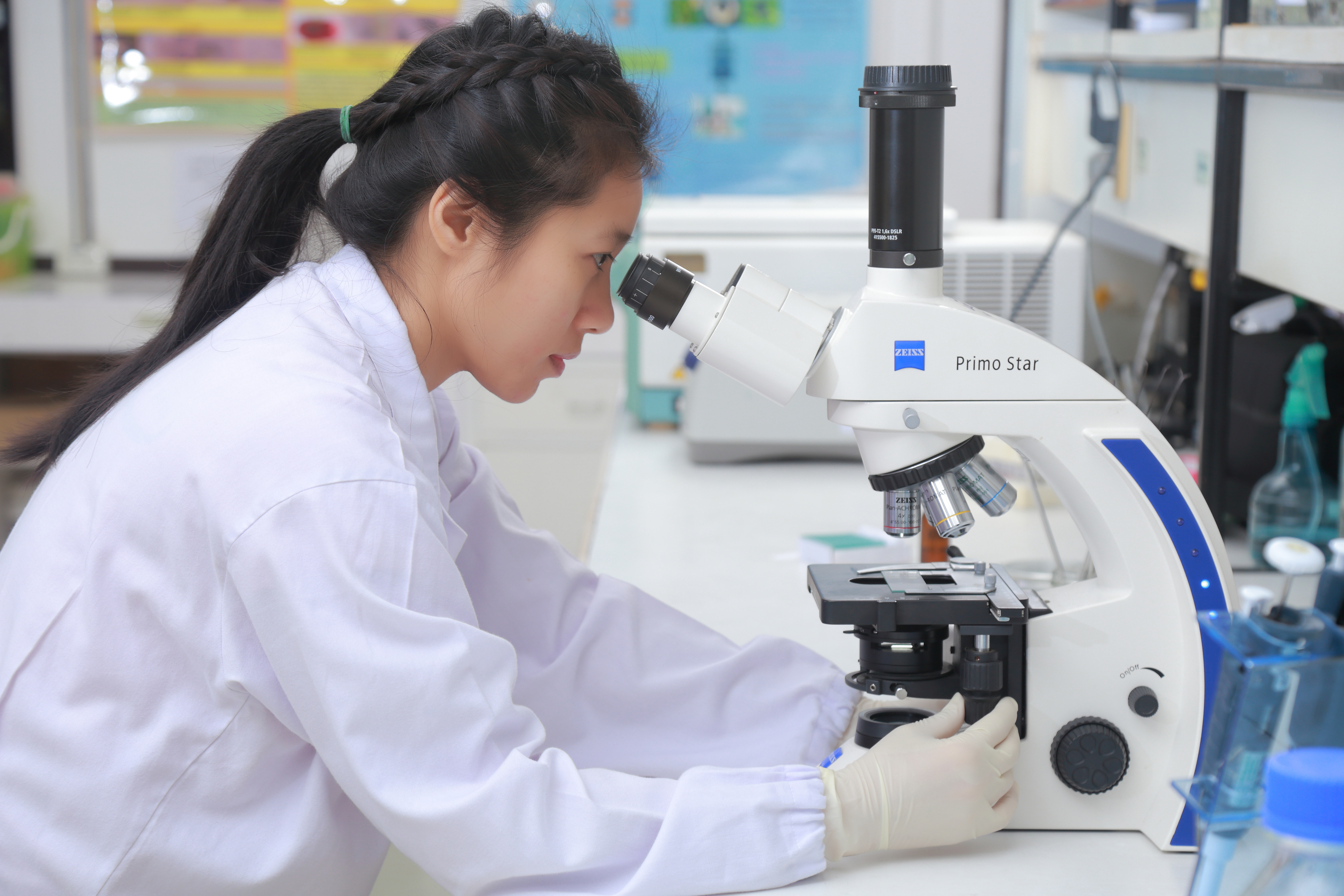
Scientists are working in the lab

Textile testing is the process of measuring the properties and performance of textile materials—textile testing includes physical and chemical testing of raw materials to finished products.

Textile testing assists textile production in selecting various types of fibers and their transformation into yarn, fabric, and finished goods such as clothing. The materials are evaluated at multiple stages of production to qualify, compare, and standardize to meet the norms of different production stages and consumer requirements. The testing of textiles is carried out in laboratories and in the field using simple to sophisticated testing methods and equipment. In textile testing, many analytical instruments and online monitoring systems are utilized. Textile testing adds value to different agencies involved in the textile supply chain, from production, distribution and consumption.

Multiple units are utilized to measure textile fibers, threads, yarns, and fabrics.

== History ==
Textile testing is the process of evaluating the quality and properties of a textile material through a series of tests at various stages of manufacturing. Textile testing, like textiles, is a vast subject. The historical evolution of textile measuring, and testing methods is difficult to consolidate as the subject is scattered and has different stage timelines for its starting points.

At the end of the 18th century, the first mechanical spinning mills began to operate. However, for more than 150 years, the textile industry relied on subpar testing equipment. The yarns had to be visually checked, either by manually stretching a few yarns or by inspecting them on the blackboard.

Between 1935 and 1945, the electronics industry made huge strides to produce military equipment. After World War II, new electronic components improved measurement technology. Testing textiles was one area of application among many. After 1950, it was possible to check in an instant what it took 30 minutes to measure [fiber length] with an end-aligned staple diagram apparatus.

=== Timeline of the important tests and equipment's ===
- Colorimetry that objectively evaluates color dates back to the latter half of the 1960s.
- Uster yarn evenness tester: In 1944–1948, Uster developed its first evenness tester.

== Objectives ==
Textile testing helps in many ways in the textile manufacturing process, from research, raw material selection, process control, product testing, process development, and testing specifications. It also plays a vital role in the operations of the textile bureau. Textile testing facilitates in-line processing [by preventing complications in subsequent steps] and also recommends wash and care instructions for the final product.

=== Selection of raw material ===
Variable quality is a characteristic shared by all raw materials. Fibers have different colors, fineness, and length, yarns vary in count, twist, and strength, and fabrics vary with density, thread count, weight, and shrinkage levels. The proper selection of raw materials facilitates the smooth operation of subsequent stages.

=== Product testing ===
The objective of product testing is to ensure that the finished product performs as expected.

== Testing standards ==
Specific organizations have developed testing procedures, such as the American Association of Textile Chemists and Colorists (AATCC) and the American Society for Testing and Materials (ASTM). These testing procedures allow for accurate assessment of textile product properties, such as the relative strength or tenacity of the fibers, etc.

Since 1921, the AATCC has been serving the textile industry. During World War I, when the Atlantic blockade prevented European dyes from entering America and the newly formed American dye manufacturers struggled to provide consistent products, the need for American textile testing methods became apparent. The AATCC has developed over two hundred textile standards, test methods, evaluation procedures, and monographs. These specifications are published annually in the AATCC Technical Manual.

The American National Standards Institute approves the textile performance standards set by ASTM International. Other testing agencies or bodies that are recognized or accepted as international standards based on contracts include the following:

	Standards organisation
ASTM	ASTM International
AATCC	American Association of Textile Chemists and Colorists
BS	British Standards
ISO	International Organization for Standardization
IWTO	International Wool Textile Organisation
EN	European Standard
Oekotex	Oeko-Tex
AS/NZS	

== Fiber testing ==
Textile testing is conducted at various stages, including raw materials, fibers, yarn, fabric, and finished product.

The basic raw material in the spinning industry is fiber, which has a high degree of variability. The HVI (High Volume Instrument) measures the following parameters: fiber length, length uniformity, fiber strength, fiber maturity, short fiber content, micronaire (fibre fineness), color grade, leaf, and foreign matter.

=== Fiber identification ===
Fiber is the fundamental component of textiles. Testing fiber properties is vitally important. Applications of a fibre are determined by its physical, mechanical, chemical, and environmental properties. Physical properties are those that can be assessed with the naked eye or a microscope. A textile testing laboratory determines the mechanical properties of different fibers.

There are various test methods that help in identifying the fibers, Fiber identification and examination includes microscopic analysis, burning tests, and chemical testing.

Fiber identification with a burning test
Fiber type	Burning test
Cellulose fibers (Cotton, Linen, Rayon)	It burns constantly with light grey smoke, doesn't melt or shrink, smells like burning paper, and leaves grey feathery ash.
Protein (Silk, and Wool)	It burns slowly, curls away from the flame, smells like burning hair and leaves crushable black ash.
Acrylic	It melts and burns, moves away from the flame, with a chemical smell and leaves a black, brittle hard bead.
Polyester	It melts and burns, with a sweet smell leaves a hard, black bead.
Nylon	It melts and burns, with a celery smell and leaves a hard, grey, tan bead.
Spandex	It melts and burns, with a chemical smell leaves soft, black ash.

==== Cotton classification ====
Cotton classification, or classing, is the process of classifying cotton based on its grade, staple length, and micronaire. Micronaire is a measure of cotton maturity. Maturity of cotton fibers is measured with single fiber measurement test or by double compression air flow test. It is expressed in percentage or maturity ratio.

==== Micronaire ====
Cotton's simple Micronaire value is determined by both the fineness of the fibres as well as their maturity. Micronaire values or reading represents the fineness of the cotton fiber. For example, a preferred micronaire range is 3.7 to 4.2. Upland cotton is coarser than Gossypium barbadense (Pima cotton).

== Yarn testing ==
The yarn undergoes different tests. Uster Technologies, commonly referred to as "Uster" in the yarn-spinning industry, is a Swiss manufacturer of analytical instruments and online monitoring systems for yarn. Most typical yarn tests include evaluating the uniformity of yarns. [Yarn evenness] that infers the yarn's evenness index.

== Fabric testing ==
Fabric inspection is a step of visual examination apart from the performance criteria; It finds various flaws and irregularities. Accordingly, it grades the fabrics as per quality level, fabric weight, shading color, number, and size of the defects. GPT stands for "Garment Package Test" and FPT stands for "Fabric Package Test" in garment and textile testing. Each buyer provides guidance for which tests are required at the fabric and subsequent garment stages.

The testing of fabrics offers a comprehensive review of the various tests that can be performed on fabrics. Fabric testing includes measurements such as fabric weight, fabric width, shrinkage testing, colour fastness to washing, fastness to light, pilling, tearing and bursting strength, etc.

The primary consideration in fabric selection is the end use. The fabric needs vary greatly depending on the application. Similar types of fabric may not be suitable for all applications.

Fabric weight or GSM is an important parameter while producing different fabrics. A carpet requires a fabric with 1300 GSM, but a robe may be made with 160 GSM. Certainly, fabrics for clothes and carpets have distinct weights.

Range of fabric weights typically used in various textile products
GSM (grams per square meter) range	Categorization	Termed as	Suitable for the textile products
0-50	Sheer fabric		Sheer curtains, Lingerie items, Wedding dresses,
50-150	Light weight	Top weight	Blouse, Lining, Shirt, T-shirt, Dress
150-300	Medium weight	Bottom weight	Skirt, Trousers, Kind of denims, and Suits
300-600	Medium to heavy weight	Bull denim	Drapery, Overcoat, Towel, Slipcover, Workwear
More than 600	Heavy		Carpet, Mat, Upholstery, Type of Winter coats

Stretchable fabrics have greater movability and are thus more comfortable than fabrics with no stretch or less stretch.

Textile standards and testing vary with the use and application areas. For example, there are specific ways to test how well military and industrial textiles work in harsh environments.

=== Special test methods ===
The comfort performance of textiles is the foremost requirement that influences product acceptance. Following comfort, safety and protection are the top priorities. Numerous tests are conducted to evaluate the performance of textiles.

==== Sweating guarded hot plate test ====
The test method evaluates the thermal resistance and water vapor permeability of fabrics, which bear on the garment's comfort.

- ISO 11092:2014 (the test for physiological effects — Test for measuring thermal resistance and water-vapor resistance)
- ASTM F1868 (test for measuring thermal and evaporative resistance)

==== Breathability test ====
Water vapor transmission rate, also called moisture vapor transmission rate (MVTR) is a method of testing or measuring the permeability for vapor barriers.

- ASTM F2298 – 03 (test for clothing materials such as protective clothing, laminates, and membranes) a similar test by Japanese Standards Association is JSA – JIS L 1099.

==== Air permeability ====
Air permeability refers to the fabric's porosity or its ability to allow air to pass through it. A standardised testing procedure is crucial for various fabrics as it uncovers fundamental qualities such as warmth in blankets and air resistance in parachute cloth. The air permeability test method is for measuring the ability of air to pass through textile materials.

- ASTM D737-96 alternative test method is
- ISO 9237:1995

==== Moisture management test ====
The moisture wicking or moisture management test is for testing moisture management properties such as wicking capabilities and drying efficiencies.

- AATCC test method 195
- ISO 13029:2012

==== Qmax test ====
The Qmax test method is used to evaluate the surface warm-cool sensations of fabric and to indicate the instantaneous thermal feeling sensed when the fabric first comes into contact with the skin surface.

==== Manikin test ====
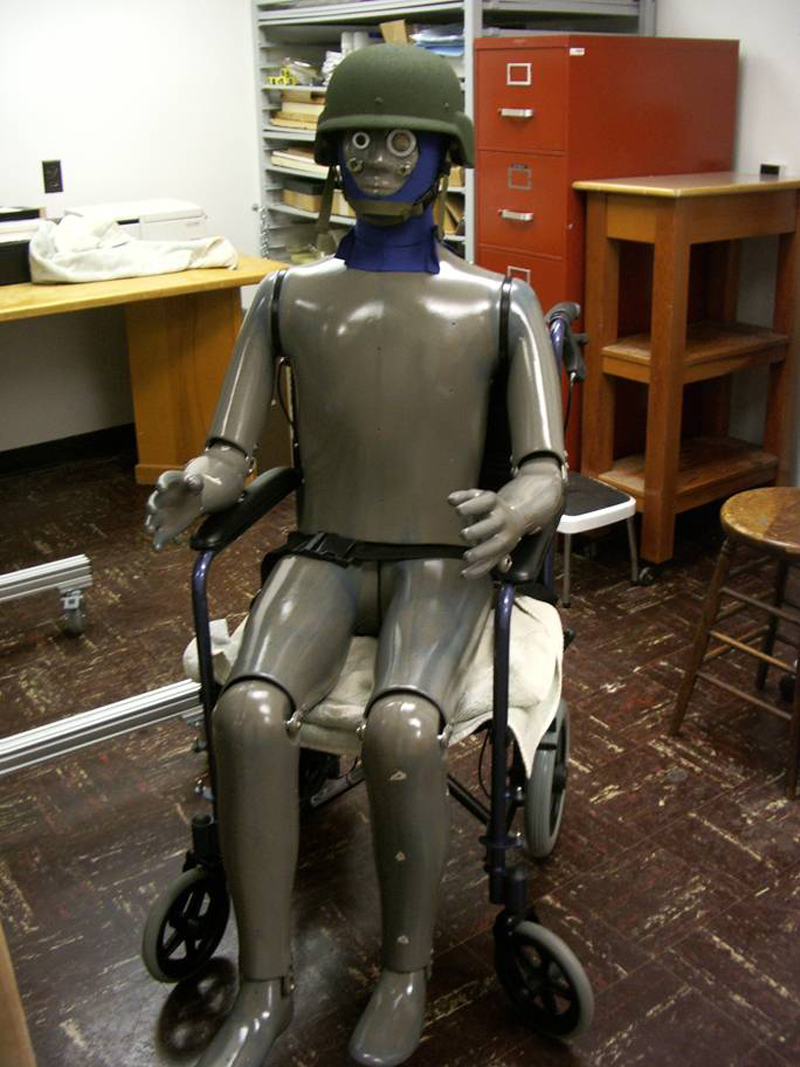
A thermal manikin being used to test helmet padding

A thermal manikin is a device for analysing the thermal interface of the human body and its environment. It assesses the thermal comfort and insulation properties of clothing, such as protective gear for the military.

==== Kawabata evaluation system ====
Kawabata evaluation system measures the mechanical properties of the textiles, such as tensile strength, shear strength, surface friction, and roughness, The Kawabata evaluation system predicts human responses and understands the perception of softness. It can also be used to figure out the short-term heat transfer properties that are responsible for the feeling of coolness when fabrics touch the skin while being worn.

== Mechanical testing ==
A variety of mechanical testing can be conducted on textile fibers, yarns and finished products. Factors such as the chemical structure of the fibers, twist of yarns and weaving structure can affect the mechanical properties. Some of these are discussed here in more depth:

=== Tensile Strength ===
For individual fibers, the following testing standard is employed: ISO 5079 (2020). In this, fibers are clamped at ends and extended at a constant rate until rupture. Separate ISO standards are also defined for testing of yarns and fabrics that work on similar principles.

=== Burst Strength ===
Hydraulic or pneumatic methods can be employed to test the burst strength of textiles. In this test, a material is stressed in all directions at the same time by use of water (hydraulic) or air (pneumatic). This is especially useful for applications such as parachutes, filters etc., as it provides more information compared to the uniaxial results obtained from the tensile strength measurements.

=== Bending Length Measurements ===
For nonwovens, ISO 9073-7 (1995) can be employed to gauge both bending length and flexural rigidity. In this, one end of a rectangular strip of fabric is supported with a ruler, while the other end hangs freely. Length of the material that will bend under its own weight to a specific extent is expressed as bending length. It provides a measure of the drapability of the fabric, whereas, flexural rigidity provides a measure of the stiffness of the fabric.

=== Tear Strength ===
ISO provides four different tests to measure tear strength of fabrics. ISO 13937-1 (2000) defines tear strength as "the force required to propagate a tear initiated under the specified conditions" This test is useful for analyzing a material's behavior when subjected to a cut.

== See also ==
- Continual improvement process
- Fabric inspection
- Pick glass
- Quality management system
- Barré (fabric)
