= Barre (surname) =

Barre is a surname. Notable people with the name include:

== Surname ==
- Abdulrahman Jama Barre, former Foreign Minister of Somalia
- Albert Désiré Barre (1818–1878), French engraver, medalist, and the 18th Chief Engraver
- Guled Salah Barre, Somali politician
- Hamza Abdi Barre (born 1972), prime minister of Somali
- Jacques-Jean Barre (1793–1855), French engraver (also often styled "Jean-Jacques Barre")
- Jean-Auguste Barre (1811–1896), French sculptor and medalist
- John Barre Toelken (1935–2018), American award-winning folklorist
- Martin Barre (born 1946), guitarist of rock band Jethro Tull
- Mohammed Sulaymon Barre (born 1964), Ex-Guantánamo detainee
- Raymond Barre (1924–2007), French politician and economist
- Richard Barre (c. 1130–c. 1202) Archdeacon of Ely and author
- Siad Barre (1919–1995), former President of Somalia
- William Barre (disambiguation), several people
- Weston La Barre (1911–1996), American anthropologist
- VC Barre (born 2003), Swedish rapper

== See also ==
- La Barre (disambiguation)
- Barre (given name)
- Barre (disambiguation)
- Barré
