= Jacques Boudin de Tromelin =

Jacques Jean-Marie François Boudin, comte de Tromelin (22 August 1771, in Ploujean, now part of Morlaix, Finistère – 3 March 1842, in Ploujean) was a French general of the First French Empire.

== Life ==
Born into an old noble Breton family near Morlaix, his ancestors included several army and navy officers. His father was Nicolas Boudin de Tromelin, lord of Tromelin (1727-1790), and his mother Geneviève du Buisson de Vieux Châtel. After studying at the École militaire de Vendôme and graduating in 1787, he entered the régiment de Limousin in 1788. It was then garrisoning Corsica. At the start of the French Revolution he and his family emigrated. Jacques joined the Armée des Princes in 1792, fighting in all the campaigns on the Rhine and in western France as well as the Quiberon Expedition of 1795. He managed to escape the executions after the expedition's failure and returned to London, living modestly and taking drawing lessons. Missing France, he convinced William Sidney Smith to take him on board HMS Diamond. Lenotre described the episode:

M. de Tromelin thus lived very agreeably aboard the Diamond, a mere amateur amused by the pursuit of enemy vessels; however, on the night of 18–19 April 1796, his host, wishing to give him the spectacle of a sensational feat of reckless sailing, escorting a flotilla; with five or six ships, towards the Le Havre roads, he attacked the French frigate Vengeur, battered her within sight of the coast, boarded the ship and was sailing back with his prize to an English port, when a gust of wind and mounting seas forced them into the Seine. Several Republican boats and the lugger Renard came out of port and pursued him. A corvette commanded by captain Le Loup reached Sydney Smith's barge; the crew boarded her ... The Lion of the Sea was caught!

All émigrés captured on French soil were condemned to death, so de Tromelin tried to pass as John Bromley, a Canadian servant of Smith's. he was sent back to Britain, where he organized Smith's escape. He was personally made a knight of the order of saint Louis on his return to France. He then joined the Armée catholique et royale de Normandie and was captured again in Caen in 1798, but managed to flee east. He served in Egypt and Syria as a major in the Ottoman sultan's forces against the French invasion of Egypt. He returned to France in 1802 and was imprisoned at the Abbaye Prison. As a result of the plot by Pichegru, Cadoudal and Mehée de la Touche, he left prison after six months, was struck from the list of émigrés and made a captain in the 112th Line Infantry Regiment.

Put in command of a battalion in 1809 during the Dalmatian Campaign, he became a colonel after the battle of Wagram, in command of the 6th Croatian Regiment. In 1813 he became adjutant general to the Armée d'Allemagne. Promoted to brigadier general and count of the Empire after the battle of Leipzig, he headed the Brigade Tromelin during the Hundred Days - this formed part of the 6th Infantry Corps of the Armée du Nord. He fought at the battle of Waterloo, commanding the last French brigade to leave the field of battle, and the provisional government tasked him with requesting passports for Napoleon from Wellington.

He also contributed to the cessation of hostilities in Paris before taking part in the 1823 Spanish expedition, fighting at Igualada, Caiders, Yorba and Tarragona and gaining the rank of lieutenant general. In 1828 he published Observations sur les routes qui conduisent du Danube à Constantinople à travers le Balcan ou mont Hoemus, suivies de quelques réflexions sur la nécessité de l'intervention des puissances du midi de l'Europe dans les affaires de la Grèce, par le lieutenant-général comte de T. Le général de Tromelin was a Grand officier de la Légion d'honneur.

== Works ==
- Observations sur les routes qui conduisent du Danube à Constantinople à travers le Balcan ou mont Hoemus, suivies de quelques réflexions sur la nécessité de l'intervention des puissances du midi de l'Europe dans les affaires de la Grèce, par le lieutenant-général comte de T., Paris, Pélicier et Chatet, 1828

== Bibliography ==
- Prosper Levot, Biographie bretonne, vol. 2, 1857, p. 938-940
- Kerviler, René (1886–1908). Répertoire général de bio-bibliographie bretonne. Vol. 5. Rennes: J. Plihon et L. Hervé. pp. 66–67.
- Lenotre, G. (1917). Histoires étranges qui sont arrivées (in French). Paris: J.M. Dent. OCLC 1046037282.
- Henry Lachouque, Le Général de Tromelin, Bloud et Gay, 1968, 269 p. (lire en ligne)
- Jacques-Jean-Marie-François Boudin comte de Tromelin,
- http://www.culture.gouv.fr/public/mistral/leonore_fr?ACTION=CHERCHER&FIELD_1=COTE&VALUE_1=LH%2F309%2F58
- http://www.culture.gouv.fr/public/mistral/leonore_fr?ACTION=CHERCHER&FIELD_1=COTE&VALUE_1=LH%2F2632%2F49
