= Leah Buechley =

American academic

- Born: Penasco, New Mexico, United States.
- Education: Ph.D., Computer Science, 2007 University of Colorado at Boulder, Boulder, CO; B.A., Physics, 1997 Skidmore College, Saratoga Springs, NY Magna cum laude with honors in Physics
- Known for: LilyPad Arduino Toolkit, 2007; Founder - Rural / Digital, 2014
- Title: Associate Professor at the University of New Mexico – Department of Computer Science
- Website: http://leahbuechley.com/

Leah Buechley is an American educator, engineer and designer who is best known as the developer of the LilyPad Arduino toolkit and other smart textiles.

Buechley is currently serving as an associate professor at the University of New Mexico's Department of Computer Science. Her research focuses on the intersection of computer science, art, architecture, and education in her work. She has done fundamental work in electronics based on paper and fabric.

== Biography ==
Buechley was born and raised in Penasco, New Mexico. In school, she was interested in math, science and the arts.

Buechley attended Skidmore College. Her original goal was to study dance to become a professional dancer, but later opted for a STEM education. She graduated with a BA in physics.

For postgraduate work, Buechley attended the University of Colorado Boulder. It was during her postgraduate studies that she decided merge her interests in STEM and arts. Her thesis was the winner of the NSF CAREER award and the Interaction Design and Children Edith Ackerman award in 2017. She received her PhD in computer science. While at the University of Colorado she also studied theater, fine arts, and dance.

Buechley served as an assistant professor at the MIT Media Lab from 2009 to 2013, where she headed the High-Low Tech Research Group, which merged arts and crafts with electrical engineering and technology. The High-Low Tech Community has discussed the convergence of high and low technology from a cultural material and functional viewpoint.

In 2019 Buechley joined the University of New Mexico as an associate professor. There she founded the research group Hand and Machine, which has researched novel and accessible 3D printing techniques, including 3D printing with metal clay to make metal objects, and recipes for 3D printing with biomaterial pastes.

== Lilypad Arduino ==
In 2006, Buechley developed LilyPad Arduino e-textile technology kits, used to integrate electronics into textiles; these kits began a major wave of DIY wearable electronics. The LilyPad is basically a microcontroller that can be sewn into any clothing and configured as desired by the user. Through attaching the LilyPad to other widgets (such as light sensors, buzzers, and accelerometers), the user may construct a dynamic piece of clothing that communicates with the person wearing the clothing and the surrounding setting.

Buechley's research led to the creation of T-shirts that function as instruments, interactive wallpapers that control their environment, and sewable electronic components. This technology has already made its way into novelty items.

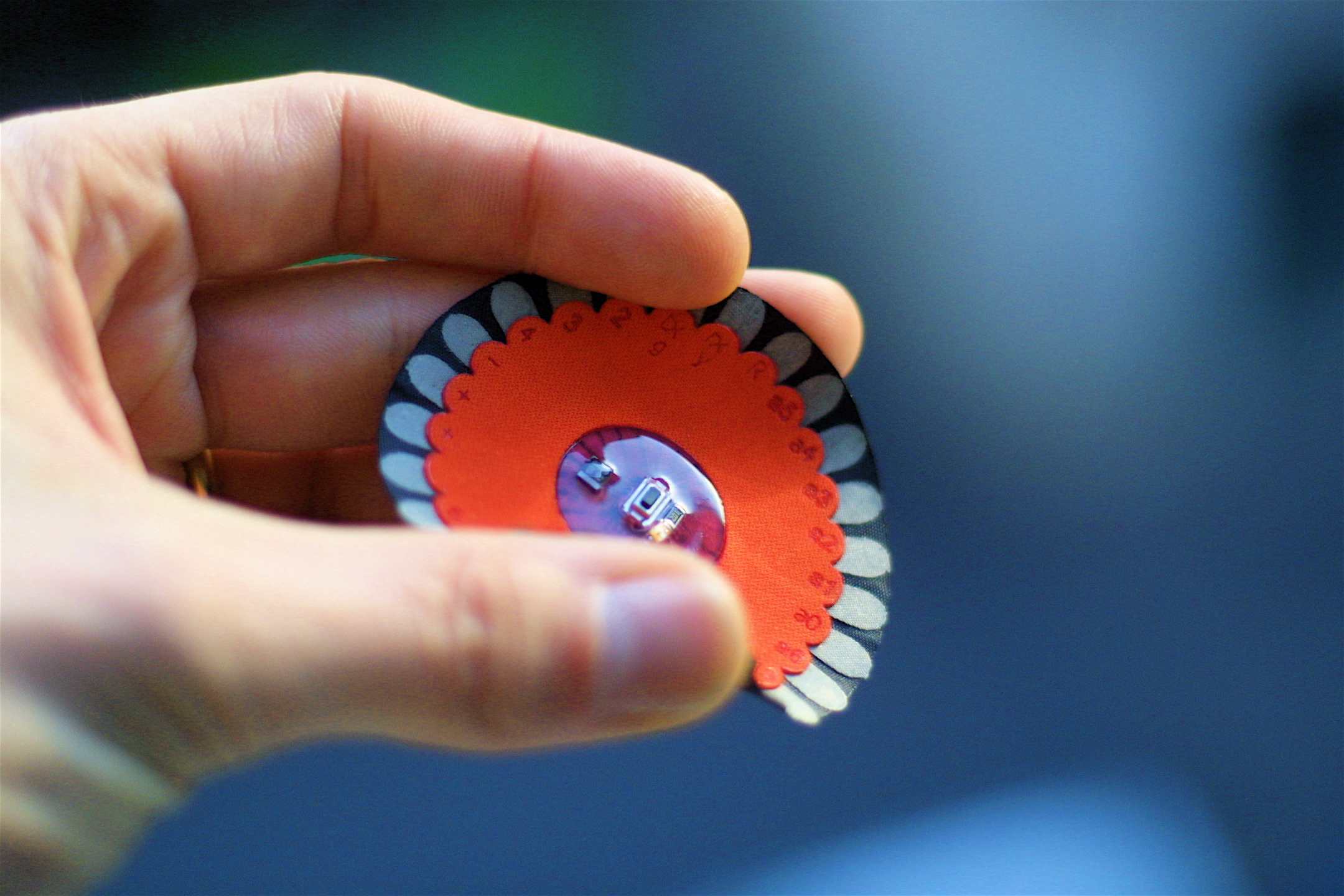
Early prototype of the Lilypad Arduino

Her work has been exhibited at the Victoria and Albert Museum, the Ars Electronica Festival, and the Exploratorium.

Buechley states that the purpose of her creations and works of art is to make technology more available and to inspire people to be "playful, fearless, experimental, and curious."

== Recognitions / Awards ==
- Ellen A. Samworth prize in Physics, Skidmore College, 1997
- University of Colorado Fellowship, 2001-2002
- Best Paper Award, IEEE International Symposium on Wearable Computers (ISWC), 2006
- MIT AT&T Career Development Professor, 2009-2013
- The Laptop Mag in its publication on February 22, 2011, listed Buechley as one of the top 20 most important women in mobile tech 2011.
- National Science Foundation CAREER Award, 2011-2014
- Edith Ackerman Award for Interaction Design and Children, 2017 co-recipient with Jeanne Bamberger

== In media ==
=== Books ===
Leah Buechley has written two books:

Textile Messages: Dispatches from the World of E-Textiles and Education, written and edited with Yasmin Kafai, Leah Buechley, Kylie Peppler, Michael Eisenberg, was first published on May 1, 2013. It focuses on the emerging field of electronic textiles or e-textiles-.

Sew electric: a collection of DIY projects that combine fabric, electronics, and programming was published in 2013 by HLT Press. It was written with Kanjun Qiu and illustrated by Sonja de Boer. Sew Electric is a series of hands-on LilyPad Arduino tutorials.
