= Baré =

Baré may refer to:

- The Baré people of Brazil
- The Baré language, spoken by the Barés
- Baré Esporte Clube, a Brazilian association football club
- Jeanne Baré, a French explorer
- Ibrahim Baré Maïnassara, a former head of state of Niger
- Baré, Cameroon
- Baré (footballer), full name Jader Volnei Spindler, Brazilian football player

== See also ==
- Barré, a surname
