= Barré =

Barré is a surname, and may refer to:

- Adhémar Barré de Saint-Venant, (1797–1886), French mathematician and mechanician
- Adriana Barré (born 1995), Ecuadorian footballer
- Alexandra Barré (born 1958), Canadian sprint kayaker
- Alex Barré-Boulet (born 1997), Canadian ice hockey player
- Denis Barré (born 1948), Canadian sprint canoer
- Françoise Barré-Sinoussi (born 1947), French virologist
- Isaac Barré (1726–1802), Irish soldier and politician
- Jean Alexandre Barré (1880–1967), French neurologist
- Jean-Baptiste Barré (1763–1830), French naval officer
- Jean-Benoît-Vincent Barré (1732–1824), French architect
- Kévin Barré (born 1990), French footballer
- Laurent Barré (1886–1964), Quebec author and politician
- Léo Barré (born 2002), French rugby union footballer
- Louis Barré (born 2000), French cyclist
- Louis Carolus-Barré (1910–1993), French librarian and medievalist
- Michaël Barré (born 1974), French football player
- Mylanie Barré (born 1979), Canadian sprint kayaker
- Nicholas Barré (1621–1686), French Minim friar and Catholic priest
- Pascal Barré (born 1959), French track and field athlete
- Patrick Barré (born 1959), French athlete
- Pierre-Yves Barré (1749–1832), French vaudevillist and songwriter
- Raoul Barré (1874–1932), Canadian/American artist and animator
- Stéphane Barré (born 1970), French rower
- William Vincent Barré (c. 1760–1829), French translator and author

== See also ==
- La Barré
- Barre (surname)
- Barrié
