= Hexoskin =

Smart shirt

Hexoskin is an open data smart shirt for monitoring EKG, heart rate, heart rate variability, breathing rate, breathing volume, actigraphy and other activity measurements like step counting and cadence. Hexoskin allows real-time remote health monitoring on smartphones and tablets using Bluetooth. The smart shirt was created to be used for personal self-experiments, and has also been used by health researchers to study physiology, elite and professional athletes to optimize their physical conditioning, and astronauts to train for space missions. All the articles quoted below are hearsay from the company itself and are currently un contactable

Hexoskin embeds physiological sensors in smart textiles materials, and is a connected object in the sense of the Internet of things concept.

== See also ==
- Clothing technology
- E-textiles
- Wearable technology
