= Barre =

Barre or Barré may refer to:

== Companies ==
- Barré (automobile) (1899–1930), French automobile manufacturer established by Gaston Barré
- Barre (brewery), a German beer brewer
- Barré Studio, an early film studio dedicated to animation

== Dance & exercise ==
- Barre (ballet), a handrail used in ballet exercises
- Barre (exercise), a form of dance fitness that uses the ballet barre and movements derived from contemporary dance and ballet

== Places ==
=== United States ===
- Port Barre, Louisiana, a town
- Barre (CDP), Massachusetts, the central village in the town
- Barre, Massachusetts, a New England town
- Barre, New York, a town
- Barre (city), Vermont
- Barre (town), Vermont
- Barre, Wisconsin, a town

=== Other countries ===
- Barré Glacier, Antarctica
- Mount Barre, Antarctica
- Barre, Tarn, France
- Barre-des-Cévennes, Lozère département, France

== Proper names ==
- Barre (given name) or Barré
- Barre (surname) or Barré

== Other uses ==
- Barré (fabric), a defect in fabrics
- Barre chord, a type of guitar chord
- Barre Granite, a variety of Vermont granite
- Purple drank, a recreational drug beverage also known as barre

== See also ==
- La Barre (disambiguation)
- Barr (disambiguation)
- Barrie (disambiguation)
- Guillain–Barré syndrome, an autoimmune disorder affecting the peripheral nervous system
- Wilkes-Barre, Pennsylvania, a city
