= Maggie Orth =

American artist and technologist (born 1964)

Maggie Orth (born 1964, Columbus, OH) is an American artist and technologist who helped create the field of E-textiles. Her 2001 MIT Media Lab PhD thesis, Sculpted computational objects with smart and active computing materials and associated publications and patents are among the early work in this field. She was named a 2007 United States Artists Target Fellow. The United States Artists foundation describes her as "A pioneer of electronic textiles, interactive fashions, wearable computing, and interface design". She founded "International Fashion Machines"., which created e-textile products.

The team of Gorbett+Banerjee and Maggie Orth were commissioned to create "Chronos and Kairos". "(movie)". YouTube. an interactive robotic sculpture, for the Mineta San Jose International airport.

"Fuzzy Apparatus". her large electronic pom-pom piece, was commissioned for the 2013 "Patent Pending show". organized by the Zero1 Art and Technology Network. and is currently on display in the Home ECOnomics show at the "Wignall Museum of Contemporary Art"..
