= William Barre =

William Barre may refer to:

- W. J. Barre (William Joseph Barre, 1830–1867), Irish architect
- William de la Barre (1849–1936), Austrian-born American civil engineer
- William Vincent Barré (c. 1760–1829), French translator
