= Barrié =

Barrié is a surname, and may refer to:

- Alicia Barrié (1915–2002), Chilean actress in Argentina
- Jean Léonard Barrié (1762−1848), French general of the Napoleonic era
- Jorge Barrié (1873–1936), Franco-Spanish industrial engineer, sports leader and politician

== See also ==
- Barré
- Barrie (surname)
