= Fabric inspection =

Systematic evaluation of fabric quality

Fabric inspection, also known as fabric checking, is a systematic fabric evaluation in which defects are identified. Fabric inspection helps understand quality in terms of color, density, weight, printing, measurement, and other quality criteria prior to garment production. Fabric inspection takes place at various stages of manufacturing, including intermediate and final. "Perching" is another term for fabric inspection.

== Procedure ==
Quality control in textiles is to inspect whether a manufactured material meets the specifications set by the buyers. It is a broader aspect that includes the quality of the final product and the encompassing materials, for example, yarn and fabric. Fabric quality addresses fabric-related issues. Fabric inspection is a step of visual examination apart from the performance criteria; it finds various flaws and irregularities. Accordingly, it grades the fabrics as per quality level, fabric weight, shading color, number, and size of the defects. In addition to ensuring the quality of the garment, fabric inspection also helps manufacturing companies reduce their reject pile, essentially improving both efficiency and delivery times.

Various methods are used in fabric inspection, including inspection on a flat table or a fabric inspection machine. In-house or third-party inspectors can do the job.

=== Visual Inspection and grading ===
Most mills use their customized inspection standards, but commonly used is the point system. It is a widely accepted system of fabric inspection as it is based on penalty points. For example standard test methods for visually inspecting and grading fabrics (ASTM D5430) and the four-point system. Today, the 4-point system is the most commonly used fabric inspection system which as implied by the name, works with a 1 to 4 deduction system in which the highest defect rating is 4 points. In the 4-point system, fabric quality is assessed based on unit points per 100 square yards. Typically, a fabric roll is deemed satisfactory if it contains 40 points per 100 yards.

=== Computerized Inspection ===
The fabric inspection machine is equipped with lights and a table enabled with guide rollers that help the inspector or a fabric checker observe every yard.

Manual and computerized inspection are both used.

=== Artificial Intelligence based fabric inspection ===
Artificial intelligence based fabric inspection systems are being developed.

== Repair and remedies ==
=== Mending ===
The fabric during the inspection undergoes rigorous examination systems, various defects can be located. Some of the manufacturing defects of the fabric are repairable through mending, a method of repairing with needlework.

=== Burling or specking ===
Burling is a repairing finish. It helps in improving the fabric's final appearance. During the inspection process, woven fabrics may require burling, which includes the removal of certain manufacturing defects such as burrs, knots, loose and protruding threads. Burling tools are used to push these defects to the fabric's back side.

=== Spotting ===
Spotting is a method of removing stains that can be used in the garment stage or on fabric as well.

== See also ==
- Textile manufacturing
- Finishing (textiles)
- Barré (fabric)
- Dead cotton
- Pick glass
