= John Barrie (footballer) =

Scottish footballer

Personal information
- Full name: John Barrie
- Date of birth: 17 May 1925
- Place of birth: Hamilton, Scotland
- Date of death: 20 June 2015 (aged 90)
- Place of death: Rhondda, Wales
- Position: Centre forward

Senior career*
Years	Team	Apps	(Gls)
1948–1951	Tranmere Rovers	14	(3)
- * Club domestic league appearances and goals

John Barrie (17 May 1925 – 20 June 2015) was a Scottish footballer, who played as a centre forward in the Football League for Tranmere Rovers.
