= Barré Charles Roberts =

English antiquarian

- Born: 13 March 1789; Westminster
- Died: 1 January 1810 (aged 20)
- Occupation: Antiquarian

Barré Charles Roberts (13 March 1789 – 1 January 1810) was an English antiquarian.

== Biography ==
Roberts was the second son of Edward Roberts, clerk of the pells in the exchequer, who died on 14 May 1835, aged 87. He was born in St. Stephen's Court, Westminster, the official residence of his father, on 13 March 1789, and received his first baptismal name from Colonel Barré, his father's early friend. From May 1797 to June 1799 he was educated under Dr. Horne at Chiswick, and from the latter date to the summer of 1805 under the Rev. William Goodenough at Ealing. He was entered as a commoner at Christ Church, Oxford, on 11 October 1805, and at Christmas 1805 he was nominated as a student by the presentation of Dr. Hay, at the request of Lord Sidmouth. He graduated B.A. on 19 November 1808.

Roberts was well versed in antiquities, especially topography and numismatics. His taste for collecting coins began in early youth; he confined himself to the coins of his own country, and his collection was based on that of Samuel Tyssen, which was dispersed in April and May 1802. It was acquired for the British Museum at the cost of 4,000l. His energy during his short life seemed inexhaustible. In 1805 and 1806 he learnt Spanish, and early in 1807 printed at Oxford fifty copies of a compendium of Spanish verbs. In February 1809, when he was not yet twenty, he contributed to the first number of the ‘Quarterly Review’ (pp. 112–31) a review of Pinkerton's ‘Essay on Medals.’ He wrote a second article for it on ‘The Travelling Sketches in Russia’ of Sir Robert Ker Porter [q. v.], but this was withdrawn at his own request. Mostly under the signature of ‘E. S. S.,’ the concluding letters of his name, he contributed several articles to the ‘Gentleman's Magazine’ on numismatics.

A lingering decline seized Roberts in the autumn of 1807, and he died at his father's house at Ealing on 1 Jan. 1810. On 8 Jan. he was buried in the parish church, where a tablet, with an inscription by his old tutor William Goodenough, his preceptor in youth, was placed to his memory. There appeared in 1814 a volume called ‘Letters and Miscellaneous Papers of Barré Charles Roberts, with a Memoir of his Life,’ by a friend, which was noticed by Southey in the ‘Quarterly Review’ for January 1815 (pp. 509–519). All his published papers, with several additional articles on ‘Abbeys,’ ‘Mitred Abbots,’ ‘Antony Wood,’ ‘Tom Hearne,’ ‘Gibbon's “Dissertation on the Iron Mask,”’ and other antiquarian topics, were included in the volume.
