= La Barré =

French family name

The French surname la Barré has several quite distinct meanings. The name is originally derived from the old French word “barre”; this had two meanings in the ancient language. Firstly, “barre” signified “a pole” and may have been applied to an individual who made or sold such objects; on the other hand, the word also meant “the bar at a toll-house” and contemporaries of men who worked in such places may have referred to them in this manner. Thus it is clear that the name has an occupational origin, that is, it is based on the type of work the original bearer once did.

It was not until the early Middle Ages that surnames were first used to distinguish between numbers of people bearing the same personal name. With the growth of documentation in the later Middle Ages, such names became essential, and a person, whose distinguishing name described his trade, his place of residence, his father’s name, or some personal characteristic, passed that name on to his children, and the surname became hereditary.

Variants of the name in modern France include Barre, Delabarre and Desbarres. Notable bearers of the name have included Pierre la Barre, also called Barriere. Born in Orleans, the son of a sailor, he was responsible for the plan to assassinate Henri IV. Michel de la Barre was a French composer and renowned flautist. Weston La Barré was an American ethnologist.

== Crescent ==
- Armoiries: D’azur a la bande d’or, accompagne de deux croissants du meme.
- Blazon of Arms: Azure between two crescents a bend all, or all.
- Translation: The crescent is associated with Faith and Hope. As this was also the symbol of the Turks or Saracens it was used by the Crusaders to show defeat of the former.
- Crest: A crescent, or all.
- Origin: France

== See also ==
- La Barre (disambiguation)
