= Rob Barrie =

Scotland international rugby union player (1912-1981)

- Born: Robert Wark Barrie; 30 January 1912 Lucknow, India
- Died: 12 July 1981 (aged 69) St. Lucie County, Florida, United States

Rugby union career
- Position: Flanker
Amateur team(s)
Years	Team	Apps	(Points)
- Hawick
Provincial / State sides
Years	Team	Apps	(Points)
1936	South of Scotland District		
International career
Years	Team	Apps	(Points)
1936	Scotland	1	(0)

Rob Barrie (20 January 1912 – 12 July 1981) was a Scotland international rugby union player.

== Rugby Union career ==
=== Amateur career ===
Barrie played rugby union for Hawick.

Barrie was injured for the 1938–39 season. The Hawick News and Border Chronicle of 2 September 1938 notes:

Rob Barrie, who was out of the game last season, was again fighting fit, and they all trusted that he would get into the form which brought to him international honours, and that he would get more caps.

His Hawick side was the first Border side to win the Edinburgh Charity Sevens at Inverleith in 1940.

They also won the Selkirk Sevens in 1939 and the Gala Sevens in 1940.

=== Provincial career ===
He played for South of Scotland District in their match against North of Scotland District on 21 November 1936.

=== International career ===
He was capped only once for Scotland, against England at Twickenham in 1936.

He was injured in the match but not replaced. [The earliest rugby union substitution in Scotland came a year later in the 1937–38 season.]

The Hawick Express of 3 September 1936 noting:

Unfortunately, early on in the game at Twickenham his shoulder was bruised, but he did not disgrace himself or his club, and [John Park, President of Hawick RFC] looked forward to their youngest international getting many more caps.

== Business career ==
Barrie ended up in the United States working for a hosiery firm.

A note from the Berwickshire News and General Advertiser on 1 March 1955 notes this anecdote:

Doug Davies, who won 21 caps with Hawick in the 1920s, is touring the US with the Scottish curling team. In New York recently he enjoyed a reunion with two other old Hawick caps, Stewart Coltman and Rob Barrie, both in the sales staff of hosiery firms.
