= Pick glass =

Magnifying glass helpful in counting thread count

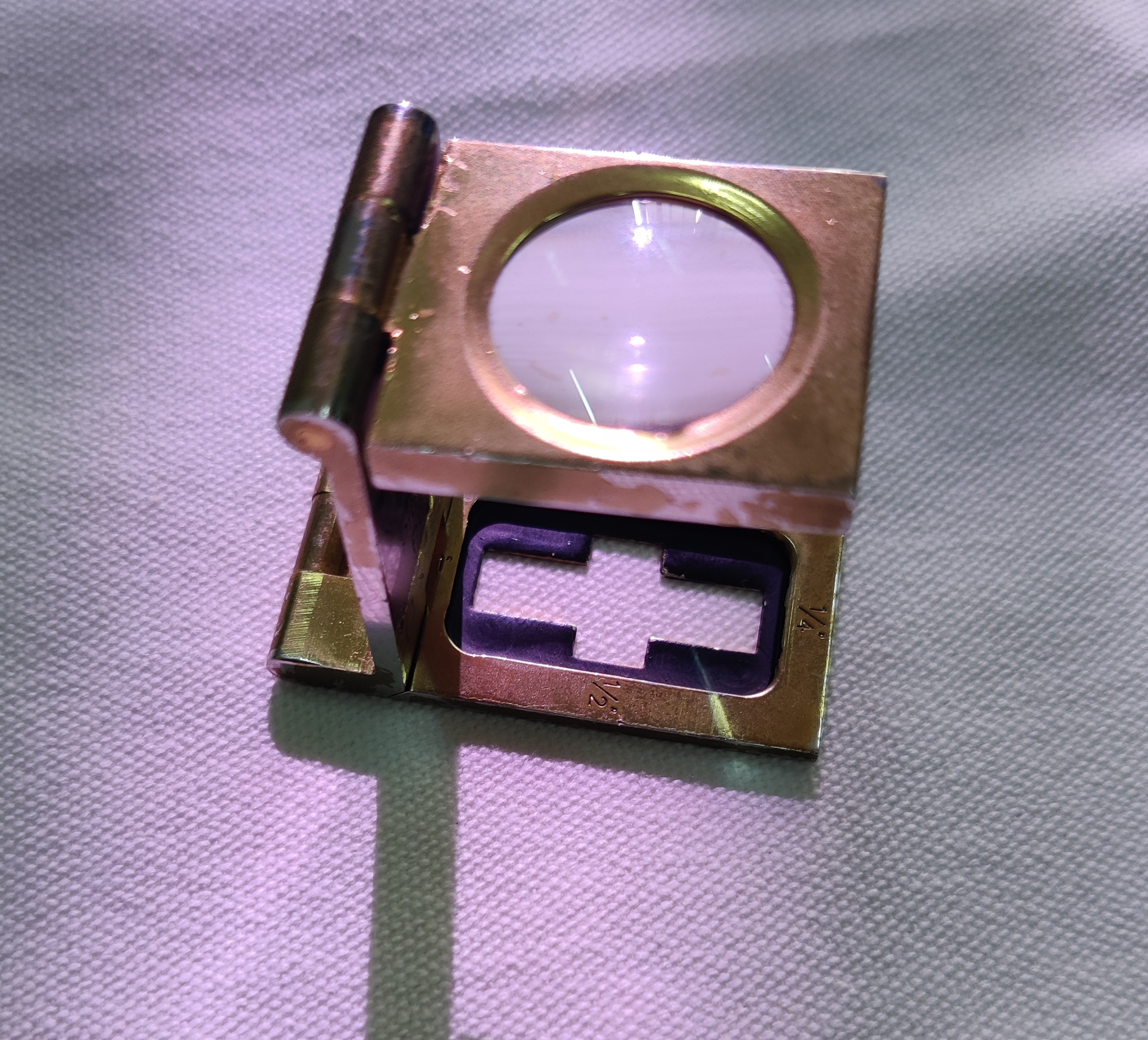
Pick glass

A pick glass also known as a piece glass is a magnifying glass helpful in counting thread count. It is used to determine the number of yarns in warp and weft in woven fabrics and courses and wales in knitted fabrics. Compact constructions of fabrics may have a higher thread count. That is also called "cloth count".

== Function ==
Pick glasses aid in measuring the following.

=== Ends and picks ===
Ends per inch is the number of warp threads per inch of woven fabric.

Picks per inch is the number of weft threads per inch of woven fabric. Pick is a term that refers to a single weft thread. By and large, the more ends and picks per inch, the finer the cloth. Balanced plain weave fabrics have warp and weft threads that are the same weight (size) and have the same number of ends and picks per inch.

=== Courses and Wales ===
Loops are the building blocks of knitted fabrics, and courses and wales in knitted fabrics are importantly similar to ends and picks in woven fabrics. The knitting structure is formed by intermeshing the loops in consecutive rows.

- Courses: are the total number of horizontal rows measured in per inch or per centimetre. The course is a horizontal row of loops formed by all the adjacent needles during one revolution. course length is obtained by multiplying loop length with the number of needles involved in the production of the course.
- Wales: are the number of vertical columns measured in per inch or per centimetre.

== See also ==
- Fabric inspection
- Linen tester
