= Kanjun Qiu =

American businesswoman

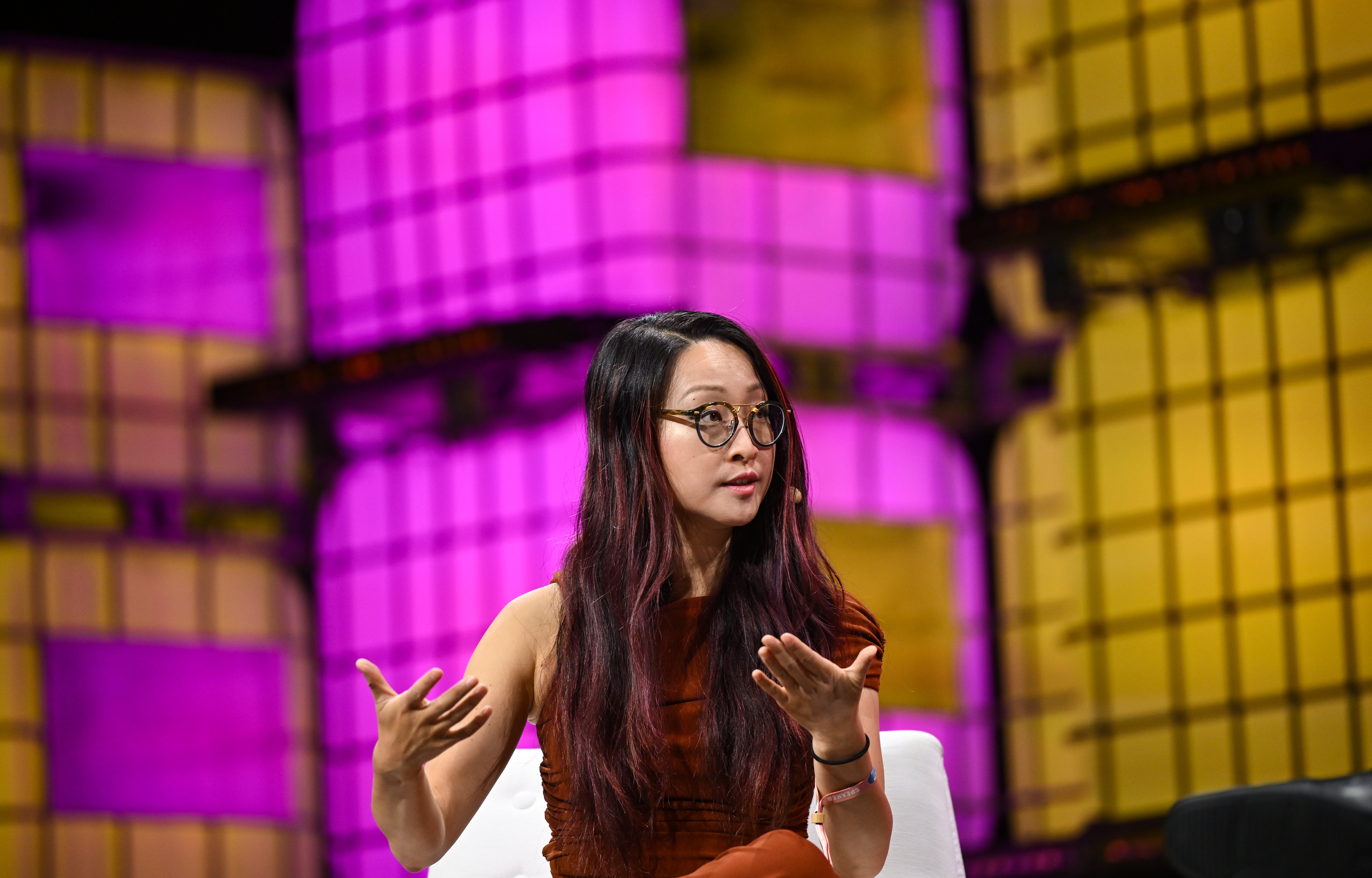
- Kanjun Qiu at Collision 2024 by Web Summit in Toronto]
- Occupation: American businesswoman

Kanjun Qiu is the co-founder and CEO of Imbue, an AI research lab. Imbue has raised $200M from companies like Nvidia to fund the development of "custom AI agents capable of reasoning".

Previously, Kanjun was the co-founder and CEO of Sourceress, a machine learning recruiting startup based in San Francisco.

Before Sourceress, Kanjun served as the first chief of staff at Dropbox as the company scaled from 200 to 1200 people. Kanjun is a Sequoia Capital Scout and the co-author of Sew Electric, a book that uses sewing to teach computer science to middle and high school students.

On December 3, 2019, Kanjun was recognized as the 2020 Forbes 30 Under 30 Featured Honoree in Enterprise Technology. Kanjun studied computer science at the Massachusetts Institute of Technology, worked as a graduate researcher at the MIT Media Lab and paid her way by writing high-frequency trading algorithms to trade the stock market.

Kanjun has spoken extensively on the importance of using hiring strategies that promote diversity in technology.

== Personal life ==
Kanjun founded The Archive, a long-term coliving house near Dolores Park in San Francisco. In October 2018, Kanjun and her fellow roommates appeared on Megyn Kelly Today to explain the inspiration behind the house.
