= William Vincent Barré =

Linguist, historian and translator

William Vincent Barré (c. 1760–1829), was a German-born French translator and author mainly notable for his writings on Napoleon.

== Biography ==
Barré was born in Germany about the year 1760 of French Protestant parents, who had left their native country on account of their religious opinions. He served first in the Russian navy, returned to France when the first revolution broke out, went as a volunteer in the army during the Italian campaign of 1796–1797, and was raised to the rank of captain for the bravery he displayed on the field of battle.

Through his intimate acquaintance with the principal languages of Europe, he became a favourite of General Bonaparte, who appointed him his personal interpreter. But he wrote some satirical verses about his employer, which seem now to be lost, and was obliged to flee from France. Pursued by Fouché's police-agents, he escaped in a small boat from Paris down the Seine as far as Le Havre, and went thence in an American vessel to England, where he appears to have arrived in 1803. The following year he published in London a History of the French Consulate under Napoleon Buonaparte, being an Authentic Narrative of his Administration, which is so little known in Foreign Countries, including a Sketch of his Life, the whole interspersed with curious anecdotes, &c., in which he furiously attacks the first consul. Before this work appeared he had already translated into French Sir Robert Wilson's History of the British Expedition to Egypt, and into English a pamphlet, Answer from M. Mehée to M. Garat.

In 1805 appeared, in English, Barré's Rise, Progress, Decline, and Fall of Buonaparte's Empire in France, the second part of the former History, which is preceded by an 'advertisement' of ten pages, in which he attacks the reviewers of his first book in the Annual Review and History of Literature for 1803. This second work is, according to Barré's entry in the Dictionary of National Biography, as scurrilous as the first.

Barré left England for Ireland, where he appears to have had relatives bearing the same name, among them being the well-known orator, Isaac Barré. About the year 1806 he printed at Belfast, on a single sheet, some verses in French, called Monologue de l'Empereur Jaune, le nommé Napoléon Buonaparte, Chrétien, Athée, Catholique et Musulman, sur la destruction de son digne émule et rival l'Empereur Noir, le nommé Jacques Dessalines, par la légion d'honneur de l'armée noire de St. Domingue, le 10 Octobre, traduit du Corse, with the motto, 'à ton tour, paillasse'. He seems to have published nothing more, and is said to have committed suicide in Dublin in 1829.

== Published works ==
- History of the French Consulate, Under Napoleon Buonaparte, London : Thomas Hurst, 1804.
- The Rise, Progress, Decline and Fall of Buonaparte's Empire in France, London : J. Badcock, 1805.
