= E-textiles =

Fabrics that incorporate electronic components

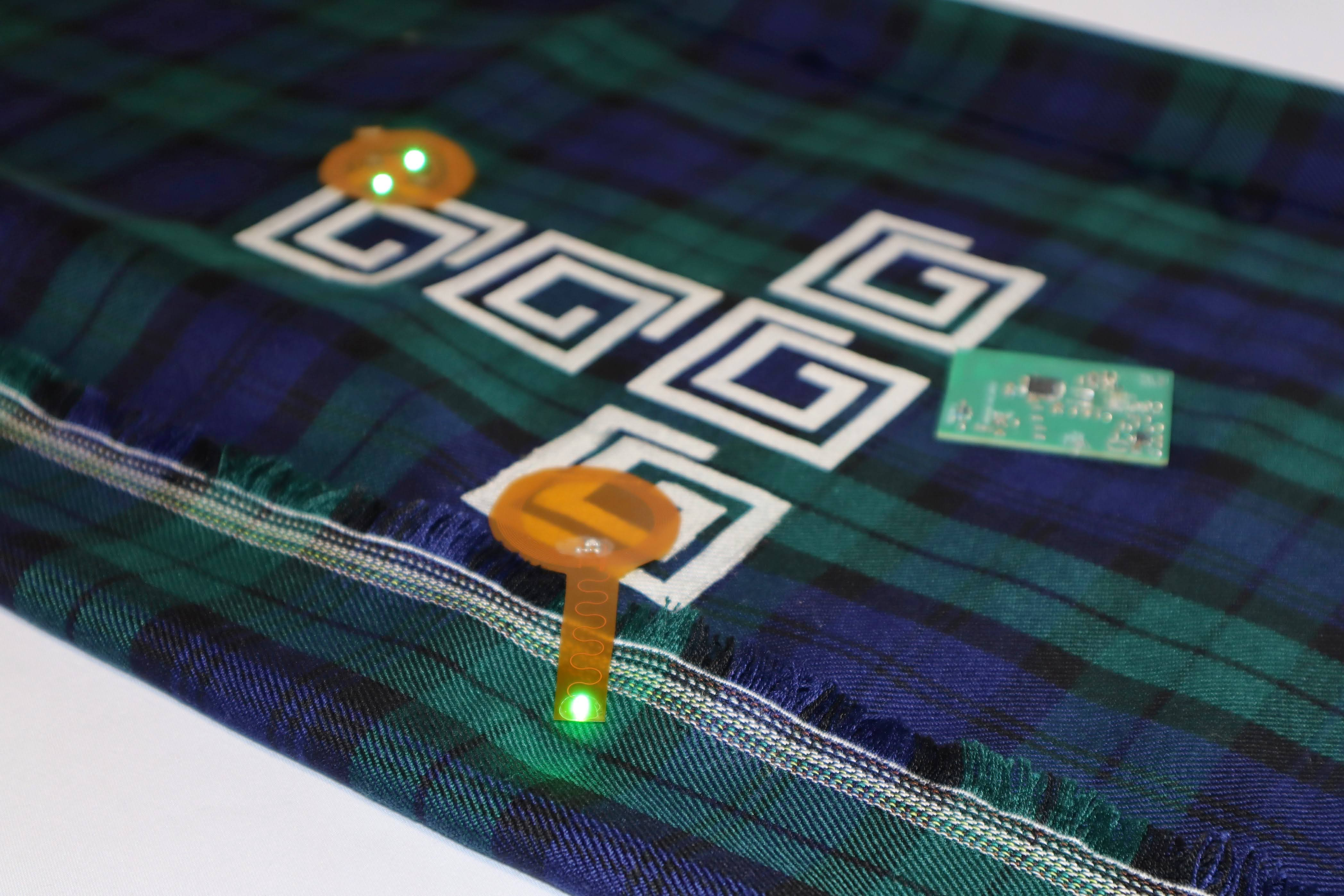
Screen printed e-textile coils showing wireless powering of flexible circuits through the fabric.

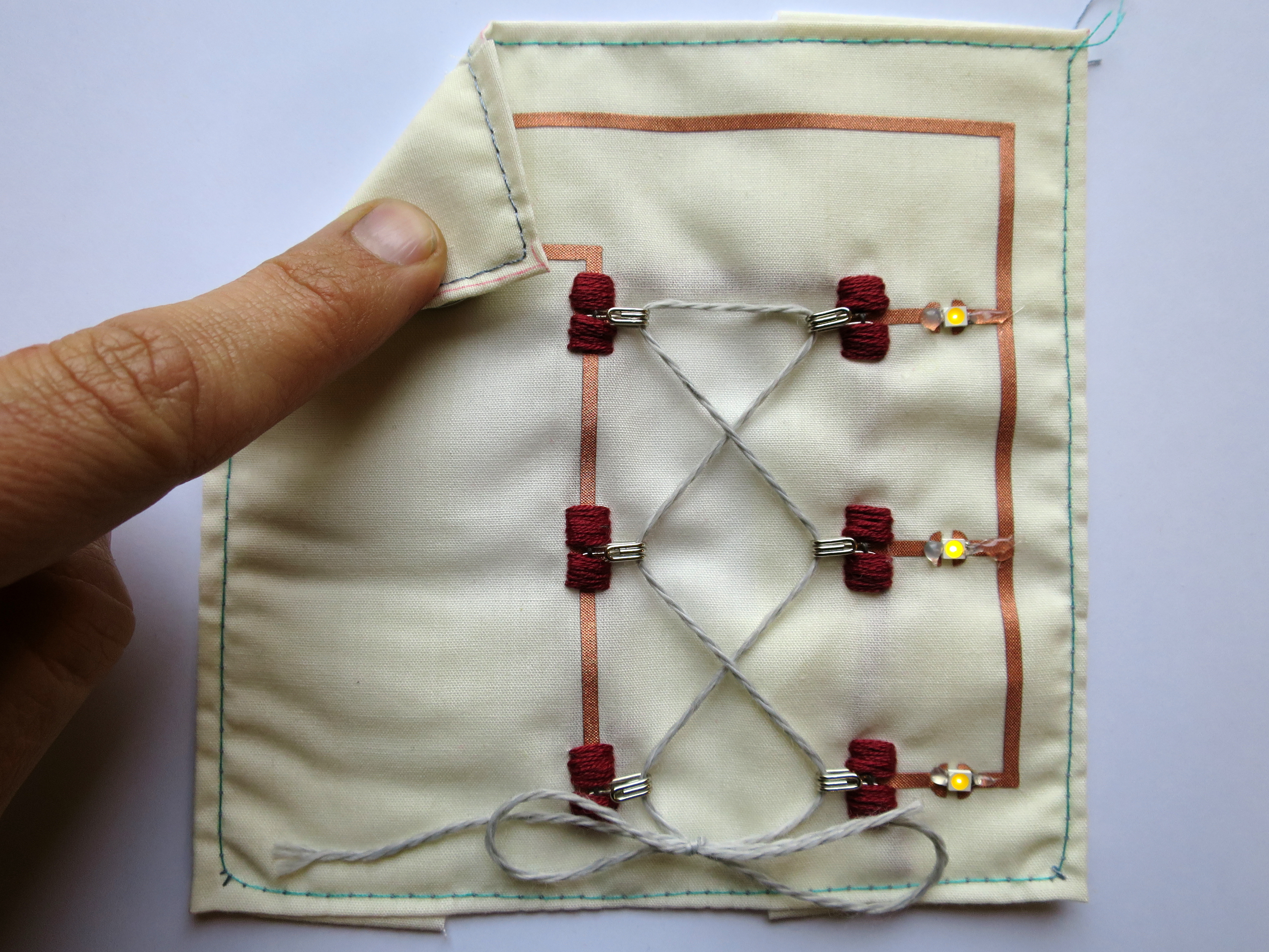
An e-textile circuit swatch

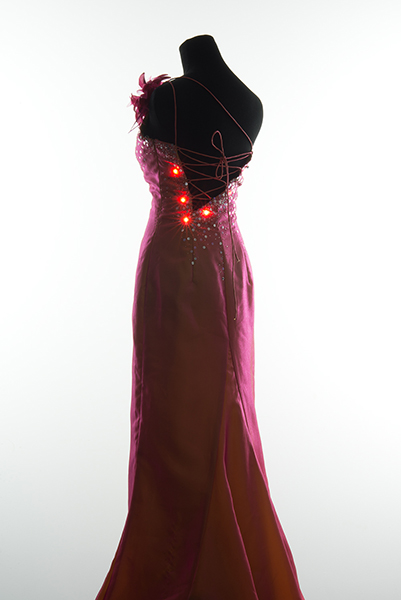
A dress with red LEDs built into the fabric

Electronic textiles or e-textiles are fabrics that enable electronic components such as batteries, lights, sensors, and microcontrollers to be embedded in them. Many smart clothing items, wearable technology products, and wearable computing projects involve the use of e-textiles.

Electronic textiles are distinct from wearable computing because the emphasis is placed on the seamless integration of textiles with electronic elements like microcontrollers, sensors, and actuators. Furthermore, e-textiles need not be wearable, as they are also found in interior design.

A new report from Cientifica Research examines the markets for textile-based wearable technologies, the companies producing them, and the enabling technologies. The report identifies three distinct generations of textile wearable technologies:

1. "First-generation" wearables attach a sensor to apparel. This approach is currently taken by sportswear brands such as Adidas, Nike, and Under Armour.
2. "Second-generation" products embed the sensor in the garment, as demonstrated by current products from Samsung, Alphabet, Ralph Lauren, and Flex.
3. In "third-generation" wearables, the garment is the sensor. A growing number of companies are creating pressure, strain, and temperature sensors for this purpose.

Future applications for e-textiles may include sports and wellness products, as well as medical devices for patient monitoring. Technical textiles, fashion, and entertainment will also be significant application areas.

== History ==
The basic materials needed to construct e-textiles, conductive threads, and fabrics have been around for over 1000 years. In particular, artisans have been wrapping fine metal foils, most often gold and silver, around fabric threads for centuries. Many of Queen Elizabeth I's gowns, for example, were embroidered with gold-wrapped threads.

At the end of the 19th century, as people developed and grew accustomed to electric appliances, designers and engineers began to combine electricity with clothing and jewelry—developing a series of illuminated and motorized necklaces, hats, brooches and costumes. For example, in the late 1800s, a person could hire young women adorned in light-studded evening gowns from the Electric Girl Lighting Company to provide cocktail party entertainment.

In 1968, the Museum of Contemporary Craft in New York City held a ground-breaking exhibition called Body Covering that focused on the relationship between technology and apparel. The show featured astronauts' space suits along with clothing that could inflate and deflate, light up, and heat and cool itself. Particularly noteworthy in this collection was the work of Diana Dew, a designer who created a line of electronic fashion, including electroluminescent party dresses and belts that could sound alarm sirens.

In 1985, inventor Harry Wainwright created the first fully animated sweatshirt. The shirt consisted of fiber optics, leads, and a microprocessor to control individual frames of animation. The result was a full-color cartoon displayed on the surface of the shirt. in 1995, Wainwright went on to invent the first machine enabling fiber optics to be machined into fabrics, the process needed for manufacturing enough for mass markets and, in 1997, hired a German machine designer, Herbert Selbach, from Selbach Machinery to produce the world's first computer numerical control (CNC) machine able to automatically implant fiber optics into any flexible material. Receiving the first of a dozen patents based on LED/Optic displays and machinery in 1989, the first CNC machines went into production in 1998 beginning with the production of animated coats for Disney Parks in 1998. The first ECG bio-physical display jackets employing LED/optic displays were created by Wainwright and David Bychkov, the CEO of Exmovere at the time in 2005 using GSR sensors in a watch connected via Bluetooth to the embedded machine washable display in a denim jacket and were demonstrated at the Smart Fabrics Conference held in Washington, D.C. May 7, 2007. Additional smart fabric technologies were unveiled by Wainwright at two Flextech Flexible Display conferences held in Phoenix, Arizona, showing infrared digital displays machine-embedded into fabrics for IFF (Identification of Friend or Foe) which were submitted to BAE Systems for evaluation in 2006 and won an "Honorable Mention" award from NASA in 2010 on their Tech Briefs, "Design the Future" contest. MIT personnel purchased several fully animated coats for their researchers to wear at their demonstrations in 1999 to bring attention to their "Wearable Computer" research. Wainwright was commissioned to speak at the Textile and Colorists Conference in Melbourne, Australia on June 5, 2012. He was requested to demonstrate his fabric creations that change color using any smartphone, indicate callers on mobile phones without a digital display, and contain Wi-Fi security features that protect purses and personal items from theft.

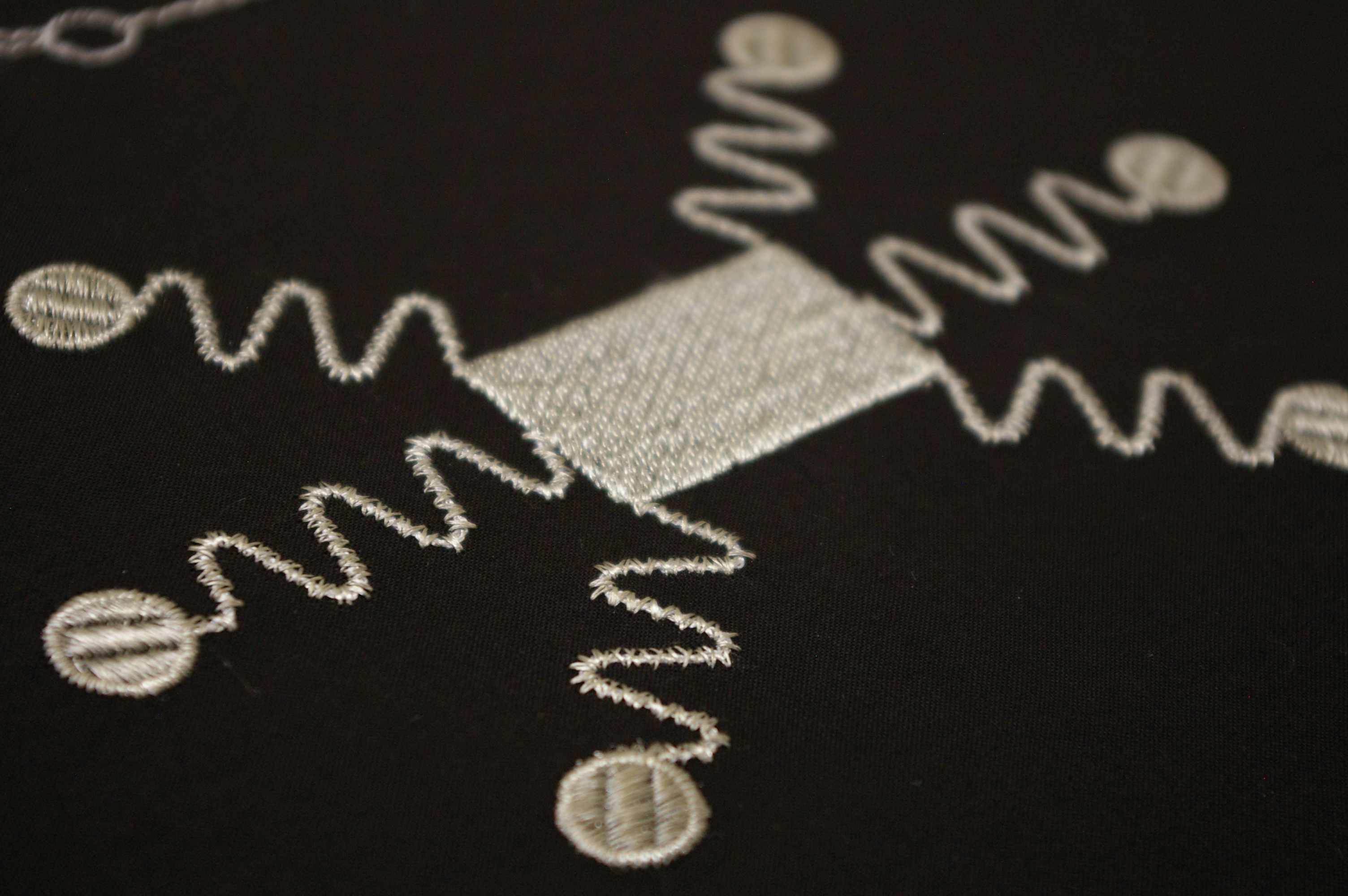
Embroidered conductive thread

In the mid-1990s a team of MIT researchers led by Steve Mann, Thad Starner, and Sandy Pentland began to develop what they termed wearable computers. These devices consisted of traditional computer hardware attached to and carried on the body. In response to technical, social, and design challenges faced by these researchers, another group at MIT, which included Maggie Orth and Rehmi Post, began to explore how such devices might be more gracefully integrated into clothing and other soft substrates. In 1999, Rehmi Post came up with "E-broidery," a method for embedding electronic circuits into textiles by using conductive threads and digital embroidery. This led to the development of Plastic Threaded Chip Carriers, which then led to the integration of standard microchips into fabrics. A first application was the creation of a wearable MIDI jacket which featured embroidered touch sensors and audio components. Post's work created a foundation for more advanced e-textiles and advocated for the importance of washability and durability in e-textiles. Among other developments, this team explored integrating digital electronics with conductive fabrics and developed a method for embroidering electronic circuits. One of the first commercially available wearable Arduino based microcontrollers, called the Lilypad Arduino, was also created at the MIT Media Lab by Leah Buechley.

== Overview ==
The field of e-textiles can be divided into two main categories:

- E-textiles with classical electronic devices such as conductors, integrated circuits, LEDs, OLEDs, and conventional batteries embedded into garments.
- E-textiles with electronics integrated directly into the textile substrates. This can include either passive electronics such as conductors and resistors or active components like transistors, diodes, and solar cells.

E-textiles are often constructed using various types of conductive yarns, including metal wire filaments, metal-coated polymer yarns, spun yarns blended with conductive materials, wet-spun conductive polymers, and graphene-coated yarns.

Most research and commercial e-textile projects are hybrids where electronic components embedded in the textile are connected to classical electronic devices or components. Some examples are touch buttons that are constructed completely in textile forms by using conducting textile weaves, which are then connected to devices such as music players or LEDs that are mounted on woven conducting fiber networks to form displays.

Printed sensors for both physiological and environmental monitoring have been integrated into textiles including cotton, Gore-Tex, and neoprene. These sensors are capable of detecting parameters such as glucose levels and other biomarkers relevant to physical health.

== Sensors ==
Smart textile fabric can be made from materials ranging from traditional cotton, polyester, and nylon, to advanced Kevlar with integrated functionalities. At present, however, fabrics with electrical conductivity are of interest. Electrically conductive fabrics have been produced by deposition of metal nanoparticles around the woven fibers and fabrics. The resulting metallic fabrics are conductive, hydrophilic, and have high electroactive surface areas. These properties render them ideal substrates for electrochemical biosensing, which has been demonstrated with the detection of DNA and proteins.

There are two kinds of smart textile (fabric) products that have been developed and studied for health monitoring: Fabric with textile-based sensor electronics and fabric that envelopes traditional sensor electronics. It has shown that weaving can be used to incorporate electrically conductive yarn into a fabric to obtain a textile that can be used as a "Wearable Motherboard". It can connect multiple sensors on the body, such as wet gel ECG electrodes, to the signal acquisition electronics. Later research has shown that conductive yarns can be instrumental in the fabrication of textile-based sensors made of fabric or metallic meshes coated with silver or conductive metal cores woven into the fabric.

There are two broad approaches to the fabrication of garments with ECG sensor electrodes in research:

- Integration into finished garments: This method involves attaching sensor elements to garments that have already been manufactured. Electrodes can be stitched into appropriate locations or applied using deposition techniques that transfer functional materials onto the fabric's surface.
- Fabrication with smart materials: This method introduces functional materials during the manufacturing process rather than afterward. Textile fabrication techniques, such as weaving or nonwoven formation, embed components directly into the textile.

== Fibretronics ==
Just as in classical electronics, the construction of electronic capabilities on textile fibers requires the use of conducting and semi-conducting materials such as a conductive textile. There are a number of commercial fibers today that include metallic fibers mixed with textile fibers to form conducting fibers that can be woven or sewn. However, because both metals and classical semiconductors are stiff material, they are not very suitable for textile fiber applications, since fibers are subjected to much stretch and bending during use.

Smart wearables are consumer-grade connected electronic devices that may be embedded into clothing.

One of the most important issues of e-textiles is that the fibers should be washable. Electrical components would thus need to be insulated during washing to prevent damage.

The use of printed e-textiles, created using methods such as screen printing, offers much higher flexibility and comfort compared to textile fibers. A new class of electronic materials that can be printed is the class of organic electronics materials, which can be conducting, as well as semiconducting, and designed as inks and plastics. Graphene, in particular, has attracted considerable attention due to its excellent conductivity, among other attributes. However, since many of these materials are water-based, the use of protective coatings is essential to maintain conductivity and long-term stability. In addition, the mechanical stress of washing can degrade the ink and cause a loss of electrical performance if not protected.

Researchers developed washable and durable magnetic field-sensing electronic textiles. These textiles integrate flexible magnetoresistive sensors within braided yarns, enabling touchless interaction through gestures. Potential applications include interactive clothing, virtual reality navigation, and safety monitoring in specialized garments.

Some of the most advanced functions that have been demonstrated in the lab include:

- Organic fiber transistors: These are textile-based transistors that are fully compatible with standard textile manufacturing processes. They are carbon-based and contain no metal components, which results in a lightweight and environmentally friendly design.
- Organic solar cells on fibers: These are photovoltaic devices made from carbon-based semiconducting materials, designed to be flexible and lightweight. When applied to textile fibers, they allow fabrics to harvest solar energy, potentially powering wearable electronics.

== Healthcare ==
=== Vital sign monitoring ===
E-textiles can be used to monitor vital signs through integrated electronics. Sensors embedded in fabrics can track parameters such as heart rate, respiratory rate, and temperature. The integration of sensors allows patients to wear non-invasive garments that provide real-time data to healthcare providers, enabling earlier detection of health issues and remote patient monitoring. Sensor technologies such as conductive yarns and printed electronics have been adapted for flexible and washable fabrics suitable for daily use.

=== Chronic disease management ===
E-textiles are used in the management of chronic diseases such as diabetes. These e-textiles assist in monitoring biomarkers like glucose, lactate, and cortisol by analyzing the wearer's sweat through integrated sensors. Monitoring biomarkers through e-textiles has been reported as a less invasive alternative to blood tests. Sweat contains biochemical information that reflects metabolic and stress-related changes in the body, which can serve as a medium for continuous health assessment.

=== Assistive technologies ===
E-textiles are used in assistive technology for individuals with disabilities. These textiles can incorporate sensors, actuators, and communication modules to help address challenges related to mobility, perception, and communication. For example, e-textiles equipped with motion and muscle sensors can assist in physical rehabilitation by tracking limb movement and providing feedback during stroke recovery. Similarly, tactile and auditory e-textile systems can be used to support people with visual impairments by translating Braille into speech. Integrating these functions into clothing can reduce bulk and weight compared to external equipment and allows continuous support during daily activities.

== Sports ==
In sports, e-textiles can be used to monitor player performance and physical metrics. By embedding sensors within uniforms and equipment, these textiles can measure physiological data such as heart rate, muscle activity, energy expenditure, and distance covered. The collected information can be used to analyze performance, track workload, and detect fatigue or potential injury. Unlike traditional wearable devices, e-textiles integrate sensors directly into garments and equipment. This integration allows continuous, real-time monitoring during activity without restricting movement.

== Military ==
E-textiles are used in military applications to track the health, vital signs, and location of soldiers, providing real-time information that can be used for operational safety and decision-making in the field. The data collected by these textiles can be used to monitor the physical and mental states of soldiers. Some e-textiles also integrate environmental sensors, allowing soldiers to receive alerts about exposure to hazardous conditions such as extreme heat or toxic chemicals.

== Sustainability ==
The recent growth in the use of e-textiles raises sustainability challenges by combining textile and electronic waste in a single product. Despite about 95% of discarded textiles being recyclable, about 85 percent ends up landfilled creating an emerging need for sustainable approaches to textile fabrication. E-textiles made of complex materials present additional challenges to repair and recycling, so some researchers have proposed e-textile design choices specifically with repair, material cost reduction, and substitution of unsustainable or otherwise harmful materials with safer or bio-based ones. Other efforts were focused on exploring alternatives to unsustainable fibers and fabrication methods such as hemp, cellulose-based, or biopolymer materials to lower the environmental impact of water-intensive industries such as cotton farming while retaining critical benefits in cost-of-production, durability, and comfort.

== See also ==
- Activity tracker
- Clothing technology
- Computer-mediated reality
- Cyborg
- eHealth
- Hexoskin
- Futuristic clothing
- Heart rate monitor
- Identity tag
- Wearable technology
  - Wearable computer
