= La Barre =

La Barre can refer to:

== Surname ==
- la Barré

== People ==
- André de La Barre (1749–1794), French general
- Anne Chabanceau de La Barre (1628–1688), French soprano of the Baroque era
- Antoine Lefèbvre de La Barre (1622–1688), governor of New France from 1682 to 1685
- François Poullain de la Barre (1647–1723), French author, Catholic priest, and a Cartesian philosopher
- François-Jean de la Barre (1745–1766)
- Luc de La Barre de Nanteuil (1925–?), Ambassador of France
- Michel de la Barre (1675–1745), French composer and renowned flautist
- William de la Barre (1849–1936), Austrian engineer and salesman

== Places in France ==
- La Barre, Haute-Saône
- La Barre, Jura
- La Barre-de-Monts, in the Vendée département
- La Barre-de-Semilly, in the Manche département
- La Barre-en-Ouche, in the Eure département

== See also ==
- Barre (disambiguation)
