= Barré (fabric) =

Defect in fabrics

Barré is an unintentional repetitive horizontal pattern in fabrics that is generally undesirable and considered a defect. It appears as a lateral stripe pattern. Barré occurs for many reasons associated with the manufacturing of textile ensembles like fiber, yarn, fabric manufacturing, weaving or knitting, or finishing faults.

== Reasons ==
Barre or barrenness is a repetitious pattern in the course direction in knitted fabrics, It may involve color differences in the yarn and geometrical variations in fabric manufacturing forming the barre patterns. In knits the variation of stitch length can also cause the barre.

Improper mixing of fibers can also be a reason for the barre. In blends like polyester and cotton, the reason may be dyeing also.

== See also ==
- Fabric inspection
