= Méhée de La Touche =

French spy

Jean-Claude-Hippolyte Méhée de La Touche (1762-1826) was the son of a surgeon in Meaux. Destined to succeed his father, he nevertheless left his home for Paris when he was 12 and ended up in the Bicêtre Prison. He was released at the Coronation of Louis XVI in 1775, but in 1776, after the death of his parents, Méhée was again imprisoned in the Bicêtre. He escaped when he was sent to Brest to serve on the French fleet. He returned to Paris and was sent to Saint Petersburg as a spy under the name Chevalier de La Touche by Honoré Gabriel Riqueti, comte de Mirabeau and Gilbert du Motier, marquis de Lafayette. He was soon uncovered and was sent out of Russia in March 1791. His next appointment as a spy was in Poland, where he established the Gazette de Varsovie, a French newspaper in Warsaw. Again his role as a spy was discovered, and he was banished from Poland as well.

He returned to Paris, and became a member of the Cordeliers and the Jacobin Club in 1792. He took part in the attack on the Tuileries Palace on 10 August 1792. He was pronounced the secretary of the Paris Commune, and organised the September Massacres at the start of the next month, together with Sulpice Huguenin and Jean-Lambert Tallien. La Touche then became the secretary of Jean-Lambert Tallien, and in November 1795 was appointed First Secretary to the Minister of the War Department of the French Directory. Soon afterwards he held the same function in the Foreign Department under Charles-François Delacroix. He resigned in April 1796, and became editor of the Le Journal des Hommes Libres. In prior work for Tallien's L'Ami des Citoyens: Journal du Commerce et des Arts, he signed his name as "Félhémesi,". an anagram of "Méhée fils" - the nom de plume he used later when taking over the journal on December 3, 1794. The former name was also used in Le Journal des Hommes Libres.

In 1797, after the Coup of 18 Fructidor, he was convicted to be transported to Cayenne, together with Charles Pichegru, François-Marie, marquis de Barthélemy and thirteen others. He ran from justice, and after a few months was pardoned. In 1799, Bonaparte sent him to the Temple Prison, but he was again released in 1801. He started the philosophical and atheist weekly magazine L'Antidote in 1802. He was again arrested and banished to Dijon and then to Oléron. He escaped from there and became a French spy in England to report on French emigrants opposed against Napoleon. He posed as a counter-revolutionary and convinced the royalists in England that France was waiting to overthrow Bonaparte. In 1804, de La Touche revealed the plot, and the support it received from Francis Drake, the minister to the Perpetual Diet of Regensburg.

After the fall of Napoleon in 1815, he was no longer welcome in France and fled first to Switzerland and then to Brussels, where in 1817 he worked as the editor of Le Vrai Liberal. He was apprehended there, but escaped again the next day. He then moved to Königsberg, until he was allowed to return to France in 1819. In 1823 he was living in Paris, where he died in poverty in 1826.

== Bibliography ==
Mehée de La Touche was a prolific writer of pamphlets, essays, articles, letters, and books. Much of his production appeared in magazines and journals he created or was editor for. An early pamphlet by him was La Queue de Robespierre (The Tail of Robespierre) of 1793, printed in 70,000 copies. It was followed by a.o. Suite à la Queue de Robespierre, Rendez-moi ma Queue, and Defends la Queue. These pamphlets were widely followed, and other people published similar ones, like the song La Queue, le Tête et le Front de Robespierre by satirist Louis Ange Pitou.

His books include:

- 1792: Histoire de la prétendue révolution de la Pologne, republished in 1798.
- 1801: Antidote, ou l'Année philosophique littéraire, 2 volumes
- 1804: Alliance des Jacobins de France avec le ministère anglais
- 1807: Mémoires particuliers extraits de la correspondance d'un voyageur avec feu Mr. Caron de Beaumarchais Sur la Pologne, la Lithuanie, la Russie Blanche, Pétersbourg, Moscow, la Crimée, etc. etc., published in Hamburg, where he resided then.
- 1814: Mémoire sur procès, Paris
- 1814: Lettre à M. l'Abbé de Montesquiou
- 1814: Denonciation au roi des actes et procédés par lesquels les ministères de S. M. ont violé la constitution, three editions
- 1818: C'est lui, mais pas de lui, Brussels, reprinted as Mémoires de Napoleon Bonaparte, Paris, 1821
- 1821: Touquetiana, Paris
- 1823: Extrait des Mémoires inédits sur la Révolution Française, Paris, 2 editions
- 1823: Deux Pièces importantes à joindre aux mémoires et documents historiques sur la révolution française, Paris

He also attached some essays of his hand to his translation of some tales by Gottlieb Conrad Pfeffel, published in Paris in 1815.
