= Clothing technology =

Technology involving the manufacturing and innovation of clothing materials

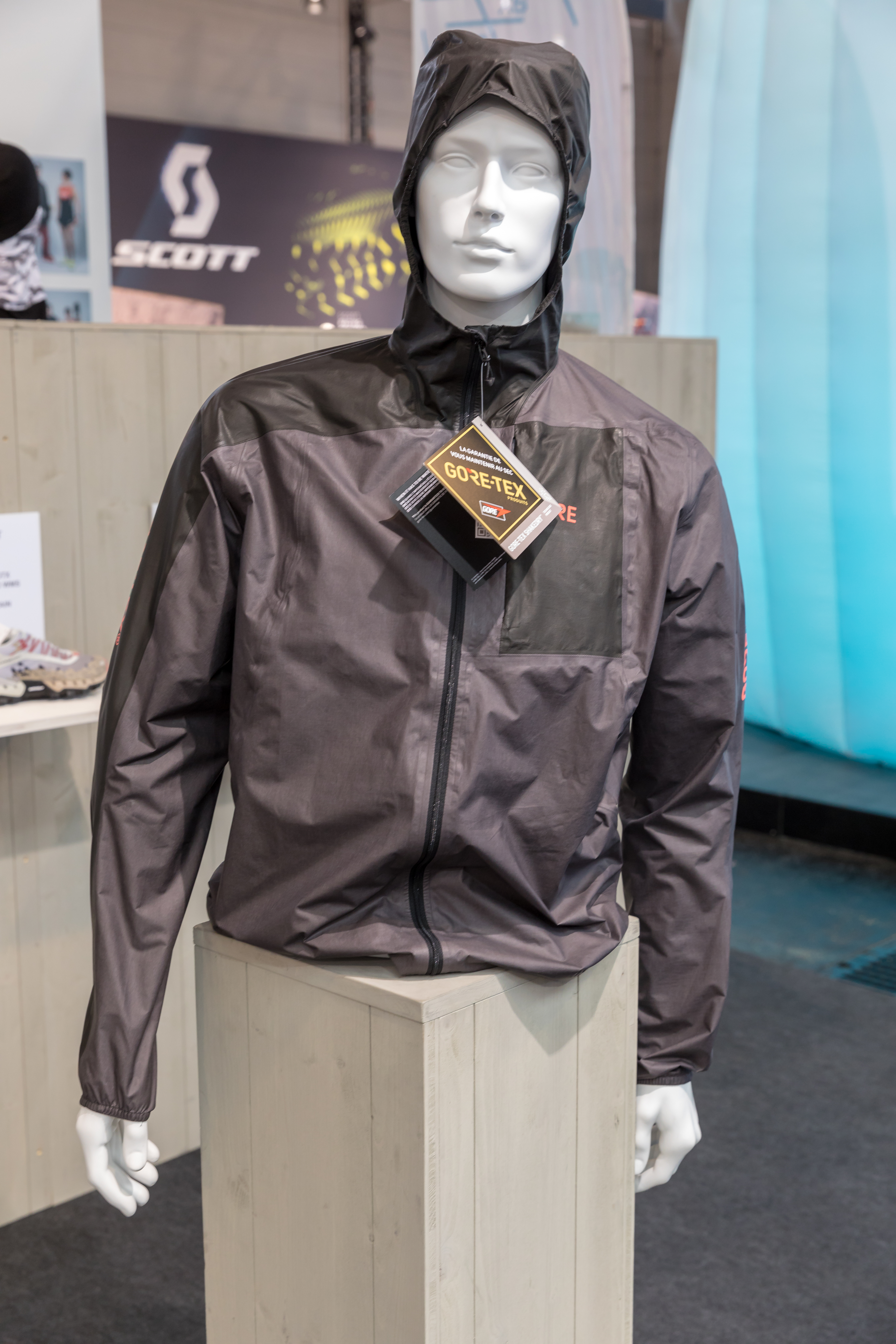
A Gore-Tex raincoat.

Clothing technology describes advances in production methods, material developments, and the incorporation of smart technologies into textiles and clothes. The clothing industry has expanded throughout time, reflecting advances not just in apparel manufacturing and distribution, but also in textile functionality and environmental effect.

== Production ==
The advent of industrialization included factories, specialized and technologically advanced equipment, and production lines for the mass production of textiles like natural and synthetic fibers. Globalization and advances in trade increased sourcing of materials and competition for wares across borders. The Swadeshi movement in India was an effort to counteract the economic control and influence that British factories exerted over the one-time colony. Concerns have also been raised over the use of so-called sweat shops.

Clothing lines based on famous designers have been featured and advertised in magazines and other media. Branding and marketing are features of the advertising age. Some designers have also become television and media personalities. In recent years fashion and design has also been the subject of television shows.

The media and various social networking platforms heavily influence clothing production. Complex software is used to go through and analyze important data related to production and consumerism. This process needs to be done quickly and efficiently in order for companies to meet customer demand thus enhancing their profit and brand.

== Sports ==
The design and constructions of sportswear has changed dramatically over time. Athletic apparel aids in the prevention of injuries, the improvement of breathability, the protection from the weather, and the encouragement of a fitness mindset. Athletes can now use wearable heart rate monitors and fitness trackers to capture a variety of fitness-related parameters, such as distance traveled, calorie consumption, heart rate, and sleep quality.

== Techwear ==
The design of techwear has evolved to become a fashion statement and technical use all at the same time. Techwear involves added zippers, buttons, straps, cord lock, etc. to help aid the changeability of outfits for different temperatures, climates, and moods. It can allow the user to change what they are wearing no matter where they are in a matter of seconds.

== Education ==
Computer-aided design is used in the development of clothing. Corporate and business training to address accounting, trade, and finance issues has also become a significant part of the trade. Courses and programs at Universities specialize in these fields. the Beijing Institute of Clothing Technology and Fachhochschule für Technik und Wirtschaft Berlin are examples institutions focused on the business. In the area of engineering development of functional clothing, TU Dresden, Germany provides courses at Bachelor, Dipl.-Ing and non-consecutive MSc. degree, and HS Niedererrhein (Mönchengladbach) provides B.Sc. and M.Sc. programs. National governments have also become involved in the business with trade rules and negotiations as well as investments such as Europe's Future Textiles and Clothing program.

== Research and scientific publications ==
The modern clothing development is performed using 3D avatars, often obtained through 3D scanning. Obtaining valid body measurements from 3D scan is still research area, while the recent topics are more related more to the speed and the accuracy of the process, than to the methods for this. TU Dresden applies high speed (4D) scanning system, developed by IBV for analysis of human body deformations during motion. Open access journal as source for reading the latest research in the area clothing development, related to soft avatars, protective clothing, comfort and other topics is the CDATP journal.

== See also ==
- Textile manufacturing
- Wet processing engineering
- Spinning (textiles)
- E-textiles
- Gore-Tex
- Polypropylene
- Rayon
- Zephyr Technology
