= Doffing =

Places and things commonly known as Doffing or doffing include:

- Doffing, Texas
- a hat tip, i.e. doffing one's hat
- the actions of:
  - a doffer
  - a doffing cylinder
