= Cotton picker =

Human or machine that harvests cotton fiber

A cotton picker is either a machine that harvests cotton, or a person who picks ripe cotton fibre from the plants. The machine is also referred to as a cotton harvester.

== History ==
In many societies, slave labor was utilized to pick the cotton, increasing the plantation owner's profit margins (see Atlantic slave trade). The first practical cotton picker was invented over a period of years beginning in the late 1920s by John Daniel Rust (1892–1954) with the later help of his brother Mack Rust. Other inventors had tried designs with a barbed spindle to twist cotton fibers onto the spindle and then pull the cotton from the boll, but these early designs were impractical because the spindle became clogged with cotton. Rust determined that a smooth, moist spindle could be used to strip the fibers from the boll without trapping them in the machinery. In 1933 John Rust received his first patent, and eventually, he and his brother owned forty-seven patents on cotton picking machinery. However, during the Great Depression it was difficult to obtain financing to develop their inventions.

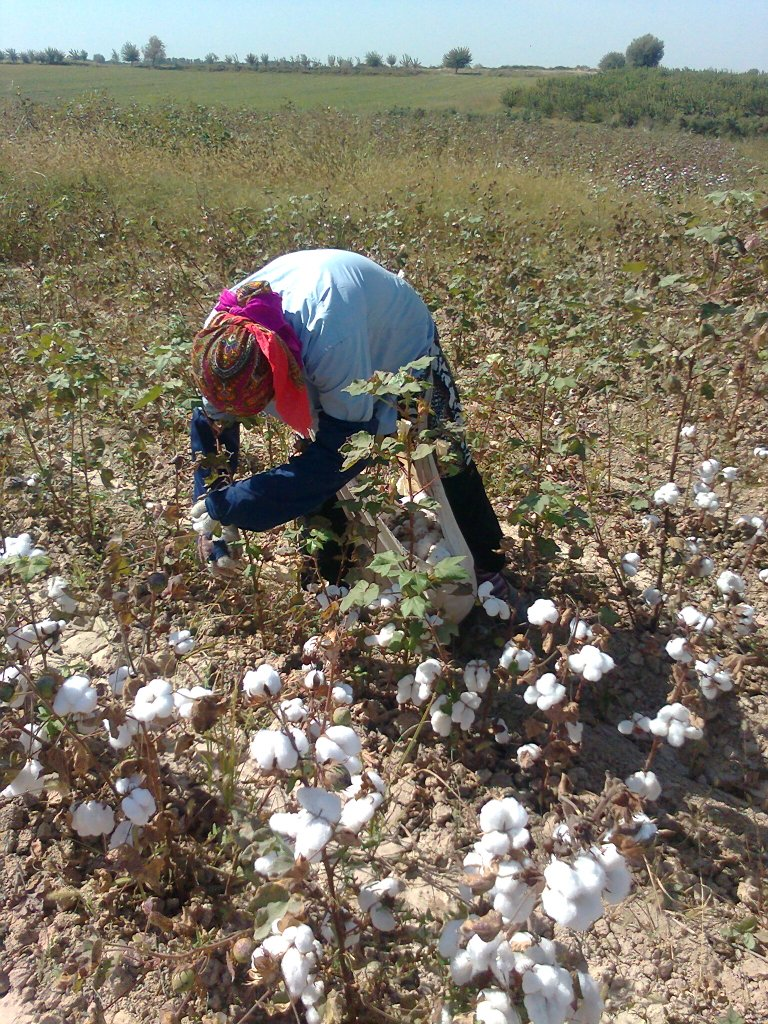
Hand picking cotton (Tashkent, Uzbekistan)

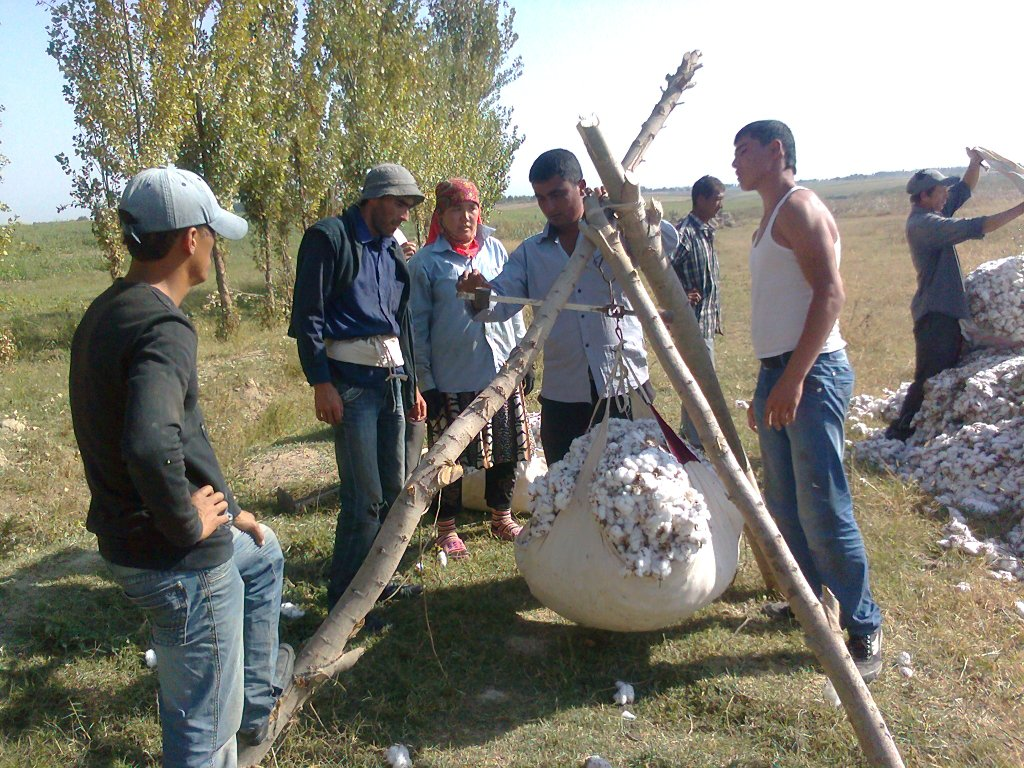
Weighing raw cotton (Uzbekistan)

In 1935 the Rust brothers founded the Rust Cotton Picker Company in Memphis, Tennessee, and on 31 August 1936 demonstrated the Rust picker at the Delta Experiment Station in Stoneville, Mississippi. Although the first Rust picker was not without serious deficiencies, it did pick cotton and the demonstration attracted considerable national press coverage. Nevertheless, the Rusts' company did not have the capability of manufacturing cotton pickers in significant quantities. With the success of the Rust picker, other companies redoubled their efforts to produce practical pickers not based on the Rust patents. Then, widespread adoption was delayed by the manufacturing demands of World War II. The International Harvester Company produced a commercially successful commercial cotton picker in 1944. After World War II, the Allis-Chalmers Manufacturing Company manufactured cotton pickers using an improved Rust design. In the following years mechanical pickers were gradually improved and were increasingly adopted by farmers.

The introduction of the cotton picker has been cited as a factor in the Second Great Migration.

=== Cotton plant improvements ===
To make mechanical cotton pickers more practical, improvements in the cotton plant and in cotton culture were also necessary. In earlier times, cotton fields had to be picked by hand three and four times each harvest season because the bolls matured at different rates. It was not practical to delay picking until all the bolls were ready for picking because the quality of the cotton deteriorated as soon as bolls opened. But about the time mechanical pickers were introduced, plant breeders developed hybrid cotton varieties with bolls higher off the ground and that ripened uniformly. With those innovations, the harvester could make just one pass through the field. Also, herbicides were developed to defoliate the plants and drop their leaves before the picker came through, producing a cleaner harvest.

== Conventional harvester ==
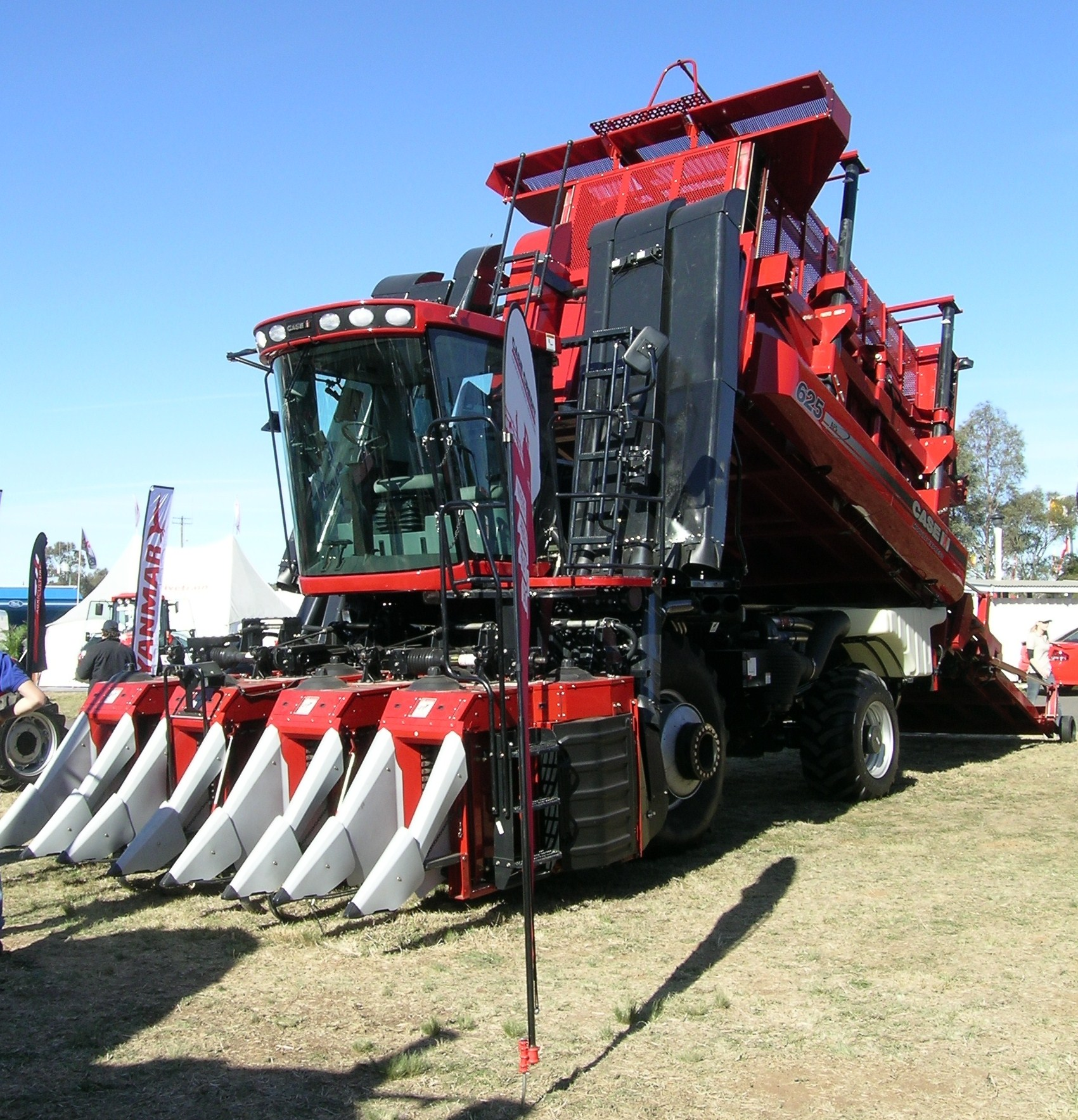
Case IH Module Express 625 picks cotton and simultaneously builds cotton modules.

The first harvesters were only capable of harvesting one row of cotton at a time, but were still able to replace up to forty hand laborers. The current cotton picker is a self-propelled machine that removes cotton lint and seed (seed-cotton) from the plant at up to six rows at a time.

There are two types of pickers in use today. One is the "stripper" picker, primarily found in use in Texas. They are also found in Arkansas. It removes not only the lint from the plant, but a fair deal of the plant matter as well (such as unopened bolls). Later, the plant matter is separated from the lint through a process dropping heavier matter before the lint makes it to the basket at the rear of the picker. The other type of picker is the "spindle" picker. It uses rows of barbed spindles that rotate at high speed and remove the seed-cotton from the plant. The seed-cotton is then removed from the spindles by a counter-rotating doffer and is then blown up into the basket. Once the basket is full the picker dumps the seed-cotton into a "module builder". The module builder creates a compact "brick" of seed-cotton, weighing approximately 21,000 pounds or 9.5 tonnes (16 un-ginned bales), which can be stored in the field or in the "gin yard" until it is ginned. Each ginned bale weighs roughly 480 pounds (220 kg).

An industry-exclusive on-board round module builder was offered by John Deere in 2007. In c.2008 the Case IH Module Express 625 was designed in collaboration with ginners and growers to provide a cotton picker with the ability to build modules while harvesting the crop.
