= Cotton module builder =

Machine used in the harvest and processing of cotton

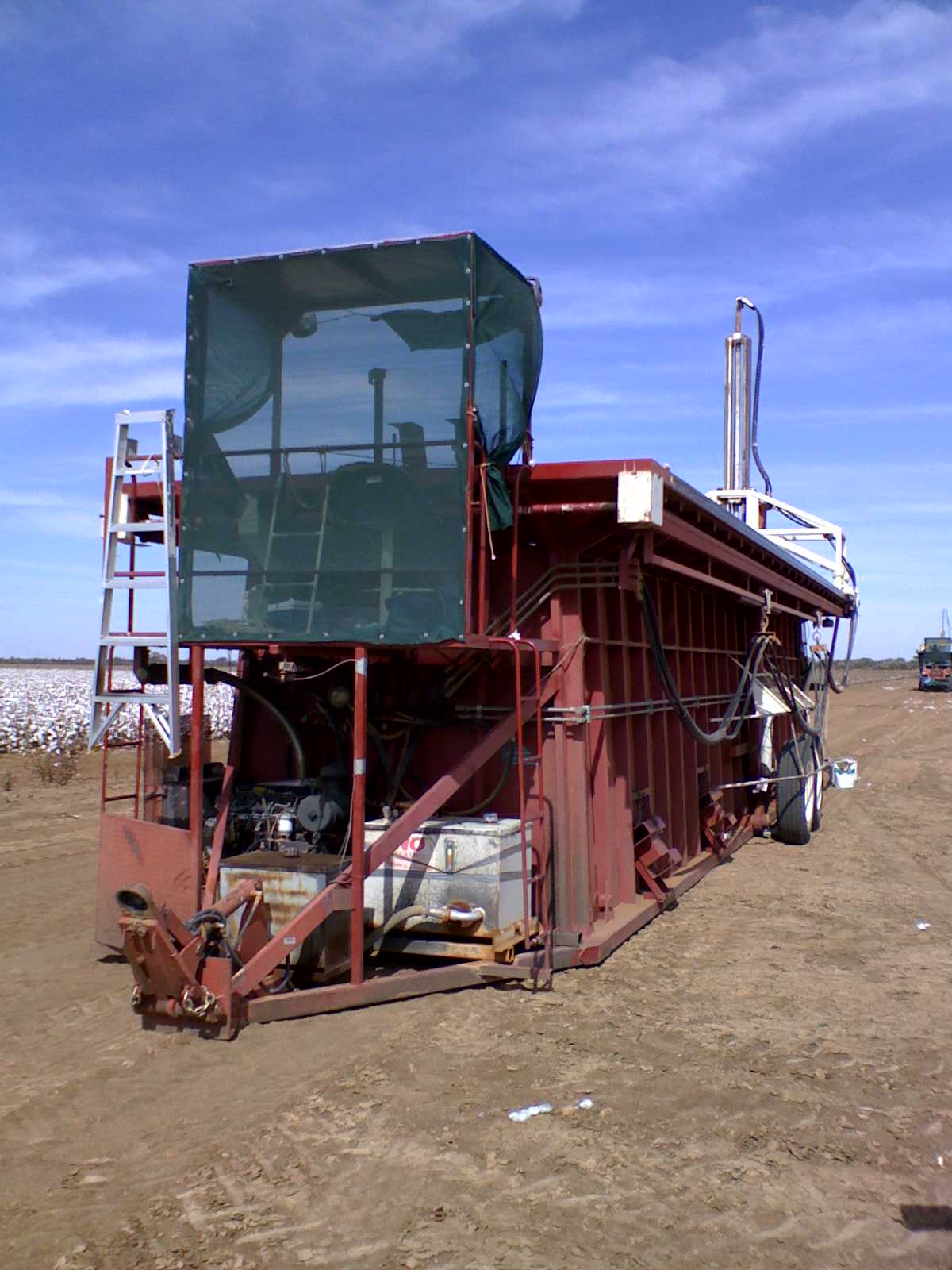
A module builder

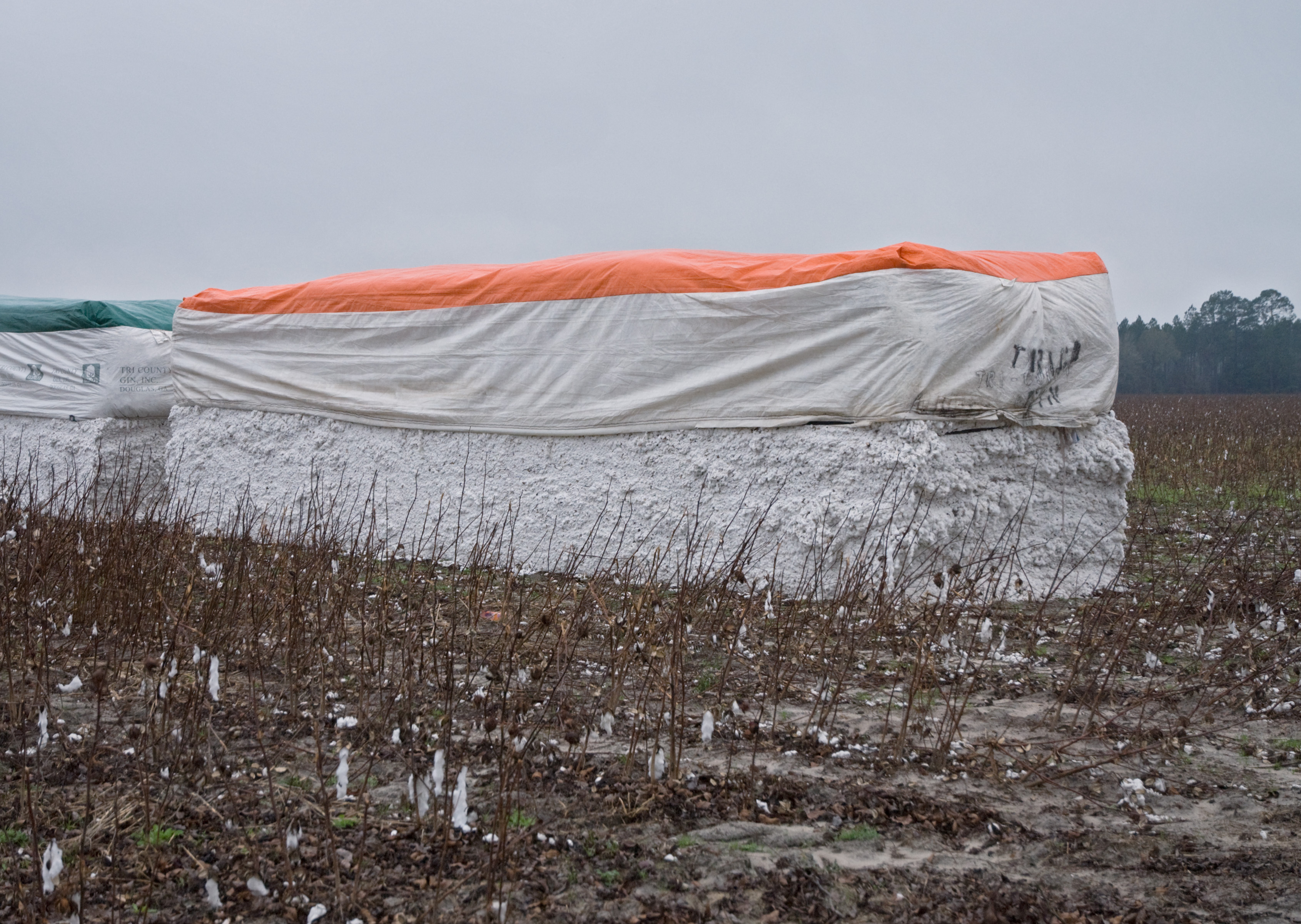
Cotton modules in a harvested cotton field (Clinch County, Georgia, USA, January 2014).

The cotton module builder is a machine used in the harvest and processing of cotton. The module builder has helped to solve a logistical bottleneck by allowing cotton to be harvested quickly and compressed into large modules which are then covered and temporarily stored at the edge of the field. The modules are later loaded onto trucks and transported to a cotton gin for processing.

== History ==
In 1971 the first experimental cotton module builder was designed and built by a team led by Professor Lambert H. Wilkes at Texas A&M University in cooperation with Cotton Incorporated. Cotton module builders have been in use since 1972. In the US today more than 90% of harvested cotton is compacted with module builders. Module builders are also widely used in other countries where cotton is mechanically harvested.

In 2002 the ASABE (American Society of Agricultural and Biological Engineers) dedicated the cotton module builder as an historic landmark of agricultural engineering, naming it "one of the top three inventions in mechanized cotton production."

== Module Building ==
Though many varieties of module builders and even combined module builder pickers exist, a typical module builder is a large trailer that is moved by a tractor and remains stationary when used. The wheels are often hydraulically retracted when the module builder is operational. A module builder is about 9 meters (30 ft.) long, 4 meters (12 ft.) high and 3 meters (10 ft.) wide. It works similarly to a garbage truck. When loading the cotton from the cotton picker into the module builder it should be distributed as evenly as possible. After loading the cotton into the module builder, a hydraulic compactor moves up and down along the length of the machine. This process is repeated every time that a cotton picker is unloaded into the module builder until a module is built up and discharged through the tailgate of the machine. The module is stored on the field and the module builder is moved into a new position to build up another module. The weight of one module is about 10 metric tons.
