= Prattville Gin Factory =

Factory in Prattville, Alabama

Coordinates: 32.459°N 86.477°W

The Daniel Pratt Cotton Gin Manufactory (Continental Eagle Corporation 1986–2012) was a cotton gin factory created by Daniel Pratt in 1854 (Present Buildings on west side of Autauga Creek), in what is now Prattville, Alabama, a town named for him. The factory became the largest cotton gin machinery factory in the world and supplied cotton gins to all cotton producing countries.

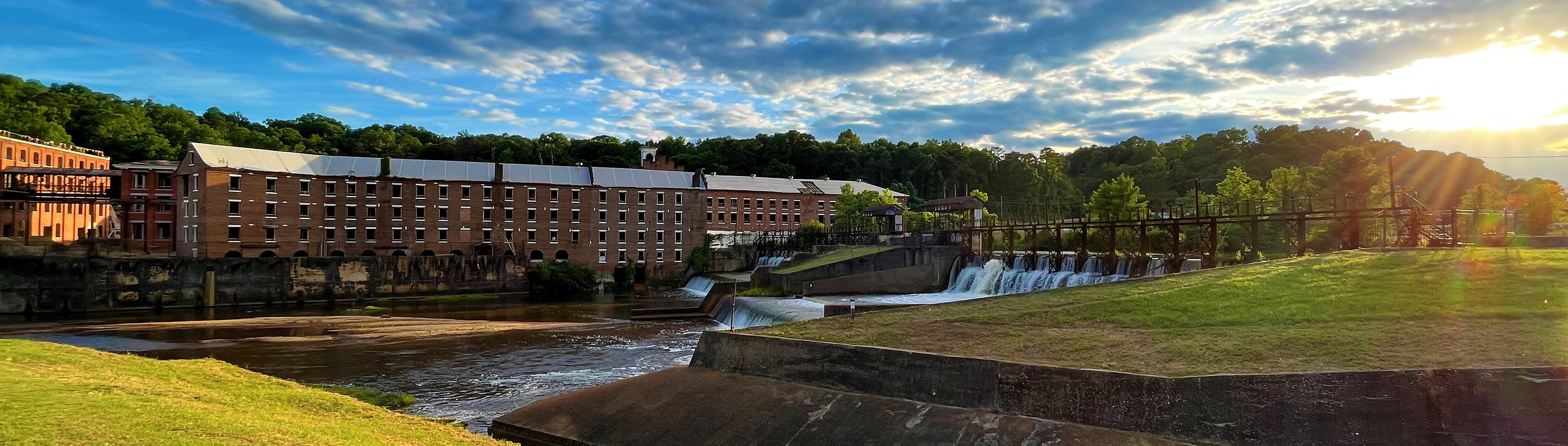
Prattville Cotton Gin Factory reconstruction; 1848, 1852, 1854 and 1912 buildings; May 2022

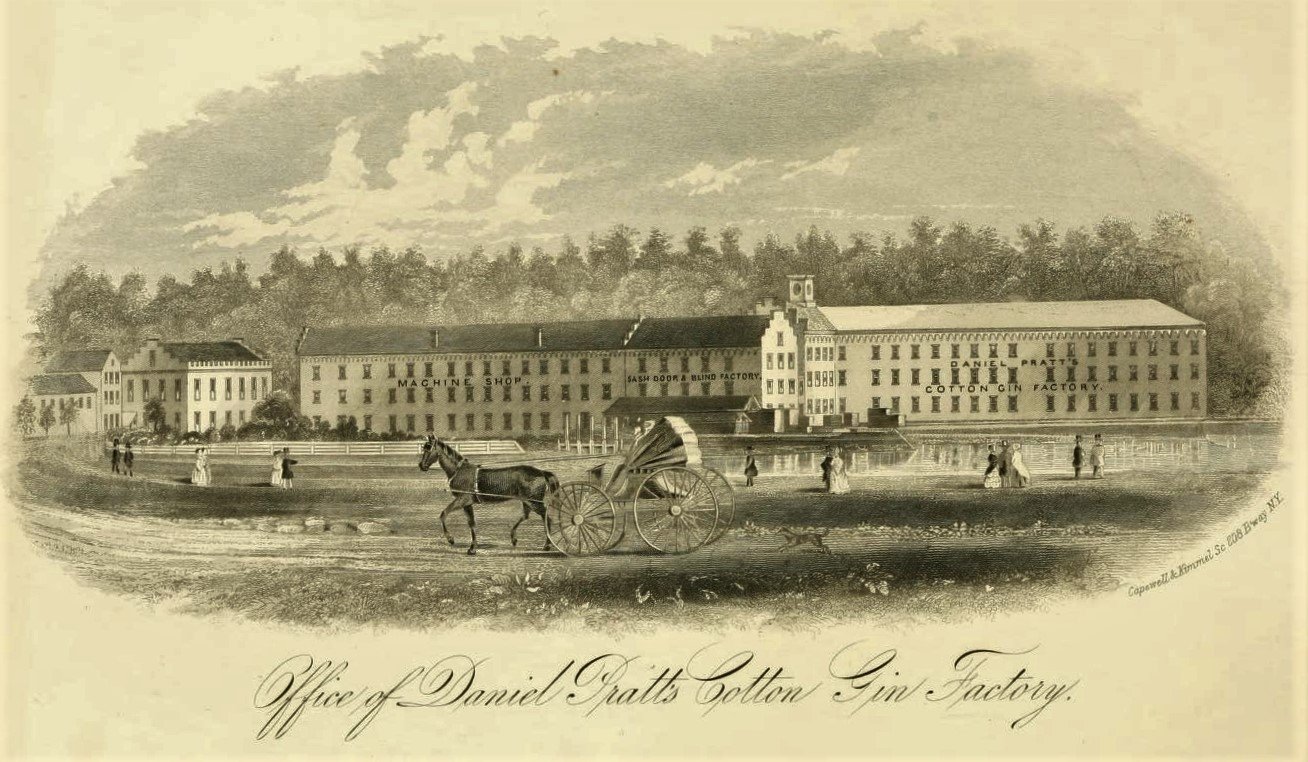
1848, 1852 and 1854 buildings of the Prattville Cotton Gin Manufactory 1860 engraving by Capewell & Kimmel of New York.

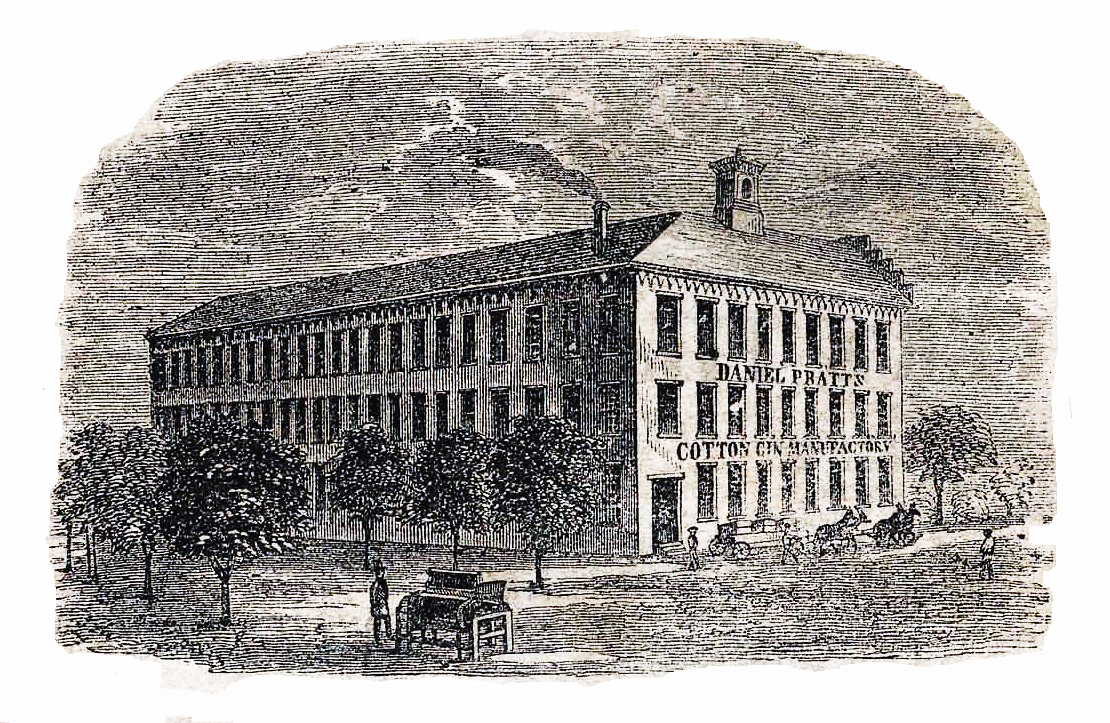
1856 Pratt Cotton Gin Factory Engraving

In 1899, the Daniel Pratt Gin Company merged with other manufacturing companies to become the Continental Gin Company. Over the years the company had several owners and names, all producing cotton gin machinery and other metal products for 158 years. In 1986 Continental Eagle Corporation became the last owner and operator of this historic cotton gin machinery supplier. These buildings represented the oldest continuously-operated industrial complex in the State of Alabama until 2012 when the business technology was sold to an Indian Company Bajaj Steel Industries Limited.

Historic American Engineering Record Continental Gin Company drawing 1997 Continental Gin logo reproduced by T Brown

In 1997, these historic buildings were a documentation project of the United States National Parks System's Historic American Engineering Record (Continental Gin Company). The "Continental Gin Company" documentation project produced measured drawings of the historic buildings and a history of the Prattville Gin Factory.

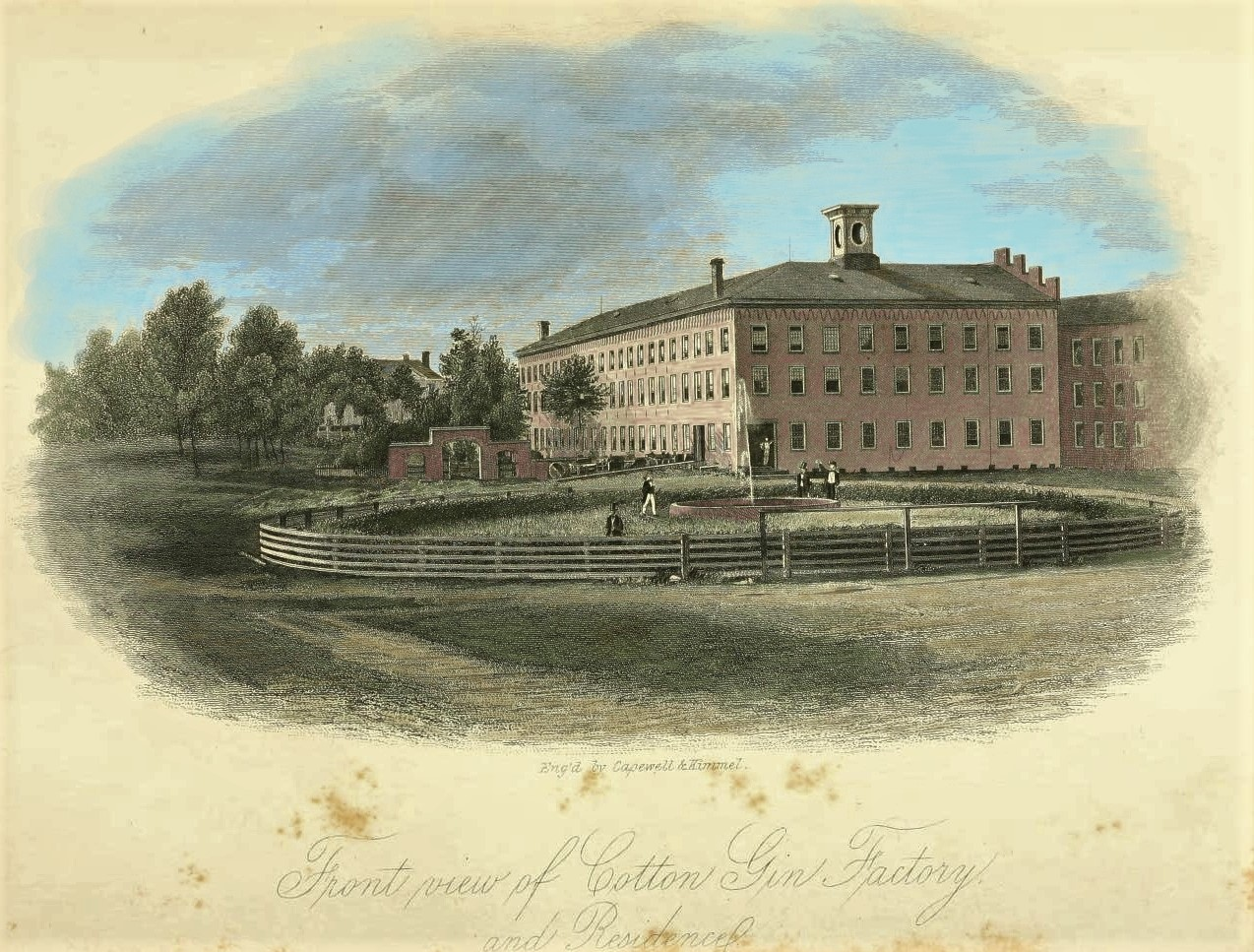
1860 Daniel Pratt Cotton Gin Manufactory and Home.....A Capewell & Kimble engraving. Photographed, repaired and Color added from the original printed book "The History of Temple, N.H." by Henry Ames Blood printer G.C. Rand & Avery 1860

== History ==
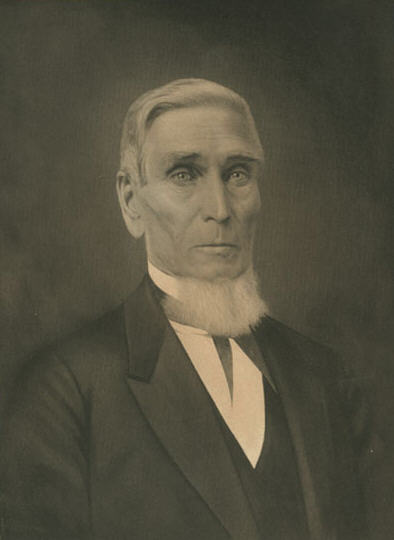
Daniel Pratt

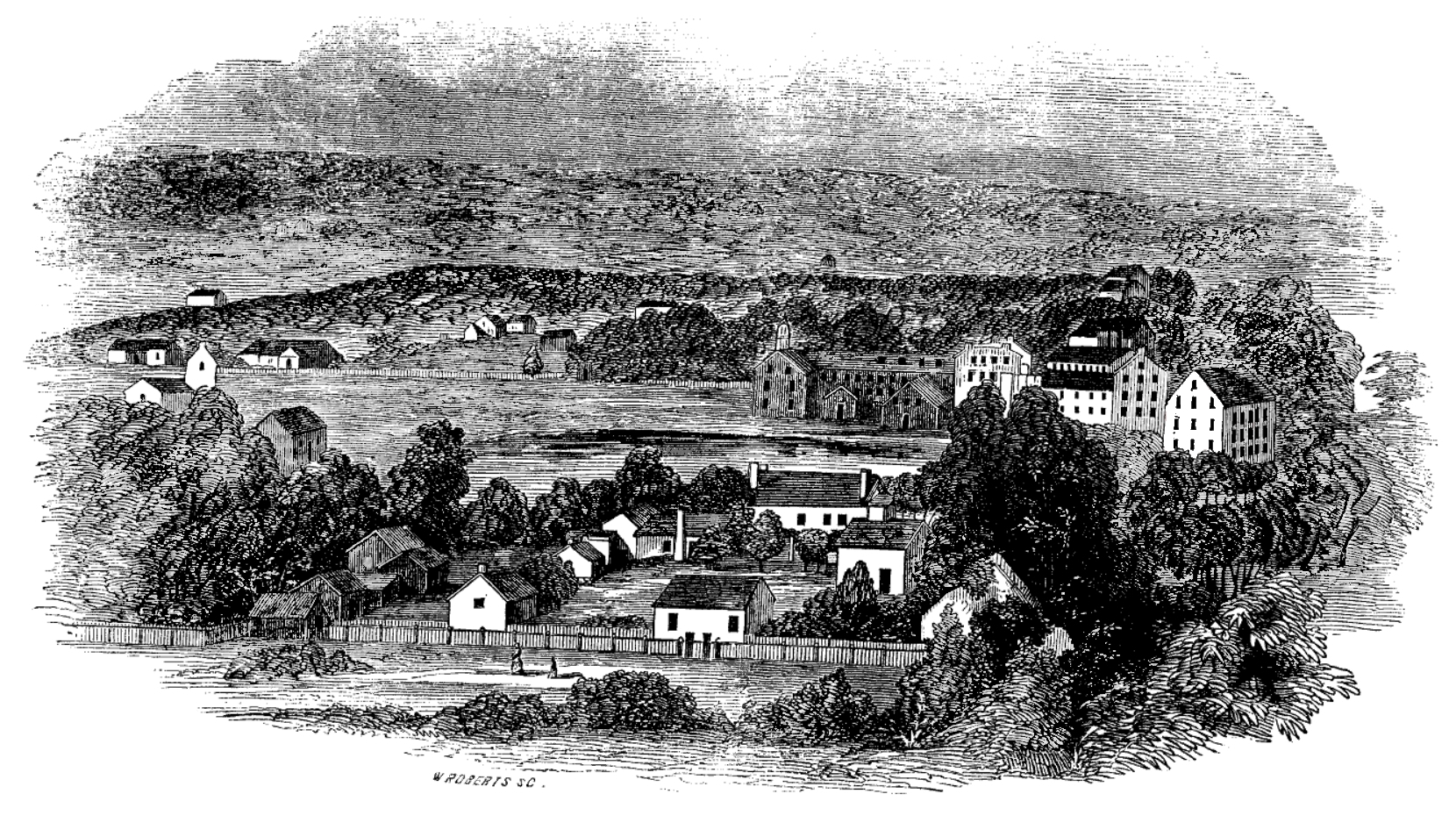
1851 Prattville engraving printed in the Debows Review. Artist view from the grape vineyard to the rear of the Daniel Pratt Home on the west side of Autauga Creek with the first wood framed Gin Factory and Textile Factory on the east side of Autauga Creek. Also the 1848 Flour and Grist mill is to the right of the engraving and located on the west side of Autauga Creek. The oldest know image of Prattville. The engraving is signed by W Roberts SC ( "Sc" means "sculpsit" Latin for he sculpted it or engraved it.) Engraver William Roberts of Binghamton New York also known for his Pottery art of family owned White Pottery.

In 1835, Daniel Pratt purchased about two thousand acres of land in Autauga County, Alabama at around twenty-one dollars an acre from Joseph May. The land was to be paid in four installments, of cotton gins and money, from 1836 to 1838. The purchase of this land was to establish a permanent Cotton Gin factory location an other manufacturing companies. The present Prattville area began with a small water operated sawmill, called May's Mill, on the banks of Autauga Creek. The waterflow of the Autauga Creek supplied waterpower to machinery used in several different factory sites. Daniel Pratt laid out his town of Prattville by 1839 and built a wood framed cotton gin machinery factory and a small textile factory on the east side of the Autauga Creek.

In 1854, Daniel Pratt built a new three-story brick cotton gin factory building, on the west side of the Autauga Creek, to increase his manufacturing capabilities of cotton gins for the growing cotton market. The Daniel Pratt Gin Manufactory produced many cotton gins to supply cotton growers of Mississippi, Louisiana and Texas. By 1851 the Pratt Gin Company was producing 600 cotton gins per year and had built 8000, since 1833, at three different Autauga County locations (Elmore's Mill, McNeill's Mill and Prattville. The Pratt Cotton Gins were sent to all cotton producing states and countries. Daniel Pratt's many factories were built to employ operatives and create a "Village of good morals and good society". The Daniel Pratt Cotton Gin Manufactory became the leading manufacturer of cotton gins, in the world, by 1860.

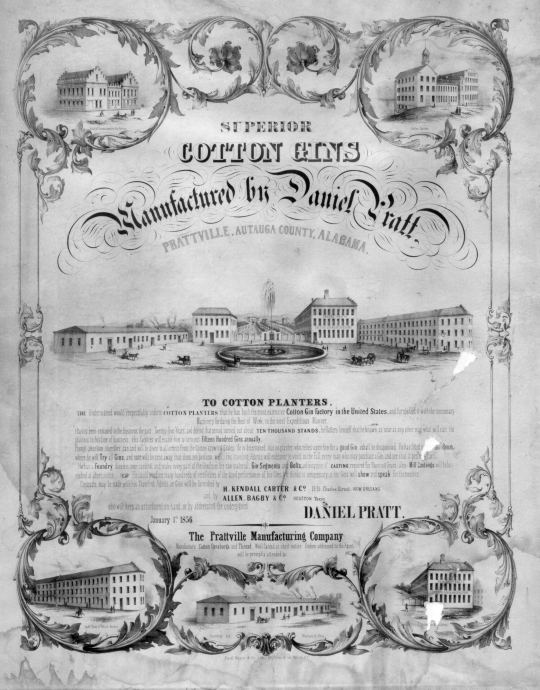
1856 New Orleans Broadsheet Advertisement engraving for the Daniel Pratt Cotton Gin Manufactory of Prattville Alabama.

The labor force of the Cotton Gin Factory was 31 in 1850 (Early Gin Factory located on the east side of Autauga Creek), 74 in 1860 (Gin Factory Location on the west side of Autauga Creek in 1854), 48 in 1870 and 192 to 278 in 1900. Another history reports the labor force in 1860 with 66 employed with 22% Slaves owned by Daniel Pratt or hired by Daniel Pratt from other owners (6 or more hired slaves each year from 1840-1845). Employee's and Slaves were paid "Overwork" money for extra hours. When built, the labor for the 1854 brick Pratt Cotton Gin Factory building was built under a design and direction contract with Daniel Pratt by T. B. Goldsby, A. J. Mullen, and Hiram Granger (all of neighboring Dallas County, Alabama) The Dallas county construction partnership used their own labor and construction works. Some histories tell us the 1848 building, near the dam on the Autauga Creek, was a water powered Flour and Grist mill when built as early as 1841, as some histories state. It is assumed the 1848 and 1852 buildings were built by Daniel Pratt and his skilled Workmen. The 1848 building, was used by 1856, as a Sash, Blind and Door factory and connected with an adjoining wall to the 1852 Machine Shop factory. Daniel Pratt was a master designer of homes, bridges and boats before 1833. He is also credited with the design of the second and present Montgomery State Capitol building. It is said that the Doors, Windows and Sash of the Alabama Capital were manufactured in the 1848-52 building. Daniel Pratt's connection with Horace King, the African-American architect, engineer and bridge builder is evidence in the Capitol Stairway. Daniel Pratt was also the designer and model builder of the Godwin & King 1832 built bridge of Columbus Georgia (History of Jones County GA).

After the Civil War, the Daniel Pratt Gin factory was spared destruction and continued to manufacture cotton gins. King Cotton was still the dominant crop of the South, supplying textile factories and jobs in North America and England. The importance of Prattville's many factories helped all people of the devastated State of Alabama and the Southern States in many ways. Daniel Pratt died, May 13, 1873, at his home, near the Gin Factory property. After his death, the Cotton Gin factory was run by Merrill Pratt and later Daniel Pratt II until 1899 when it merged with other Cotton Gin manufacturing companies to form the world-famous Continental Gin Company. Continental's headquarters was built in Birmingham and then moved to Prattville in the 1960s. The Gin Factory continued to operate under different owners through the years until, the last owner, Continental Eagle Corporation stopped U. S. production in 2012.

Today, a conservative estimate of 250 million people work in the many different Cotton related industries of the world. The process of Cotton Ginning is the last step in the cotton farm market operation. The market and sale of Cotton is in the form of a cleaned processed bale of cotton produced at the many Cotton Gins around the world. Many Cotton Gins still operate with machinery manufactured from the banks of the Autauga Creek in Prattville, Alabama. These Historic Prattville Factory buildings show the Craftsmanship of design and workmanship of Alabama's first industry.......You can see the very skilled work in the fingerprints of the bricks manufactured over 170 years ago. Nationally the site displays the history of industrial buildings design and construction from 1848, 1852, 1854, 1898, 1899, 1912, 1957 and 1976. Many thousands of employed workmen and women have worked with the related companies associated with these buildings.

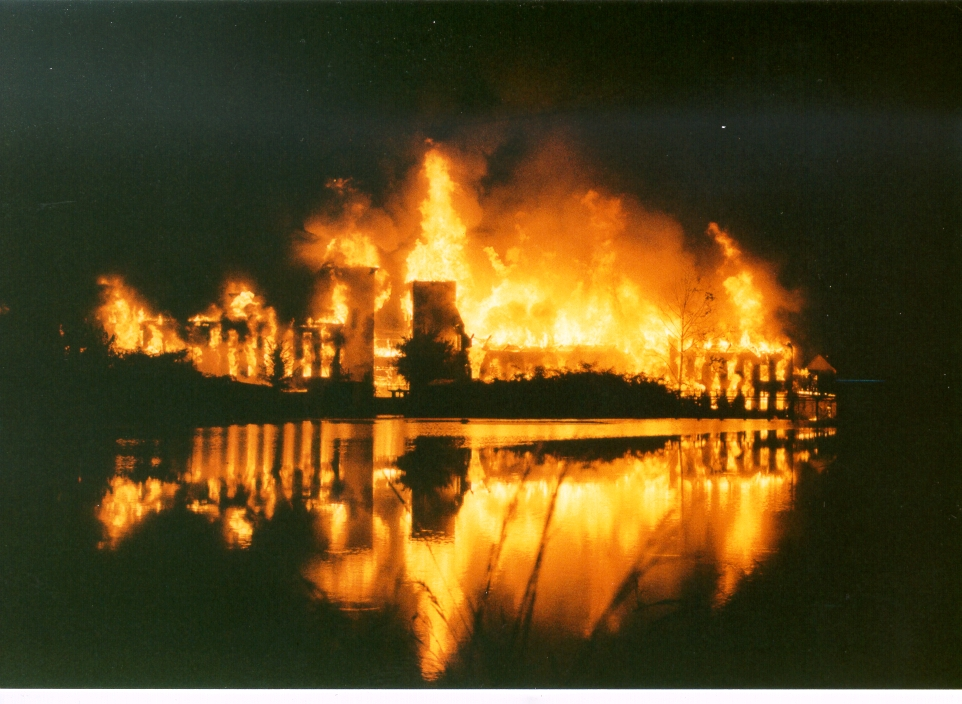
2002 Fire photo of the PMC Prattville Manufacturing Company buildings of Prattville AL. Located on the east side of the Autauga Creek. (Downtown side where the present Green space is located....The Picker House building is the only surviving building.) This burned Textile factory was the setting of the 1893 famous ghost stories of 10 year old Willie Youngblood and his mother Venie) (These buildings were unrelated in products or management to the Daniel Pratt Cotton Gin Factory buildings presently located on the west side of the Autauga Creek.)

These historic Cotton Gin Factory buildings have been sometimes confused with the Prattville Manufacturing Textile factory PMC once located on the opposite side of the Autauga Creek from these Cotton Gin Factory buildings. The Textile factory buildings burned in 2002 with the textile "Picker House" the only remaining building on the town east side of the Autauga Creek. These two cotton related industries were both created by Daniel Pratt but there was no operating connections. Prattville Manufacturing PMC was a textile factory that manufactured cotton yarn and cotton cloth. The Daniel Pratt Cotton Gin Manufactory built cotton gins and other gin machinery for cotton growers around the world.

== Manufactured products during 1848–2012 ==
Cotton Gins, Cotton Feeders, Cotton Bale Presses, Cotton Suction Systems, Cottonseed Systems, Dust Systems, Cotton Cleaners, Seed Cotton Unloading, Cotton Drying Systems, Steam and Heavy Oil Engines, Seed Cotton Module Building Systems, Seed Cotton Module Trucks, Cotton Gin Buildings, Seed House Buildings, Cotton Seed Delinters, Rollers Gins, Long Staple Cotton Cleaning Systems, Textile Handling and Cleaning Systems, Shipping Containers, Field Fertilizer Spreaders, Citrus and Pecan Harvesting Machinery, Banana Ripening Systems, Cotton lint Cleaning Systems, Cotton Lint Batt Conditioners, Contracted machinery for the Atomic Bomb "Manhattan Project", Machine gun Mounts, Bombs and Rockets, Hydraulic Cotton Module Feeders, Cotton Gin Saws, Cotton Gin Ribs, Cotton Module Trailers, Historic Doors, Sash and Blinds, Horse Power Systems, Carriages, Wagons, Cast Iron Fences, Iron Bearing Housings, Electronic Control Systems, Electric Motor Controls, Video Scanning cotton grading controls for Cotton Lint Cleaning, Ship Gun Turrets, Aquaculture Aerators, Cottonseed Machinery, Tractor Mounted Cotton Cleaners.

Prattville Projects of Metal – gates, front steps of the Prattaugan Museum building and local Masonic building, Autauga Creek Main Street deck metal, primary school bell tower, flag poles, Pratt Cemetery road gates, metal water gate supports, operation systems and metal castings of the Prattville Autauga Creek Dam.

Early Company Patents used before 1900 (parcel listing) 1857 Daniel Pratt Cotton Gin – 1873 Merrill Pratt Cotton Gin improvement – 1881 Merrill Pratt & Washington Ellis Cotton Gin – 1881 Merrill Pratt & Washington Ellis Cotton Gin – 1889 Merrill Pratt & Washington Ellis Cotton Gin – 1892 W G Beckwith, Merrill Pratt & Washington Ellis Huller-Cotton Gin – 1893 W G Beckwith, Merrill Pratt & Washington Ellis Cotton Gin improvement – 1899 George Lemonie Cotton Cleaner – 1877 F E Smith Cotton Gin Feeder – 1881 F E Smith Cotton Gin – 1899 T C Eberhardt Feeder & Cleaner for Cotton Gins – 1871 Daniel Pratt Cotton Gin patent reissued 1857 patent with improvements of design.

== Recent history ==
In 2012, the last Cotton Gin manufacturer and owner of these historic buildings, Continental Eagle Corporation stopped production and closed down the factory. On December 29, 2014, the factory buildings were set for auction. The buildings and land was purchased, at auction, by the local Historic Prattville Redevelopment Authority. Several companies had expressed an interest in purchasing the historic buildings and property. The board of HPRA invested thousands of dollars to the property to repair and stabilize the roofing of the historic buildings. The property had a development company in Atlanta interested but those efforts failed to materialize. Envolve Communities LLC, of Montgomery, Alabama partnered with the HPRA Historic Prattville Redevelopment Authority to reconstruct the Historic Prattville Cotton Gin Factory buildings into "The Mill at Prattville" new and modern apartments.

== Gallery ==
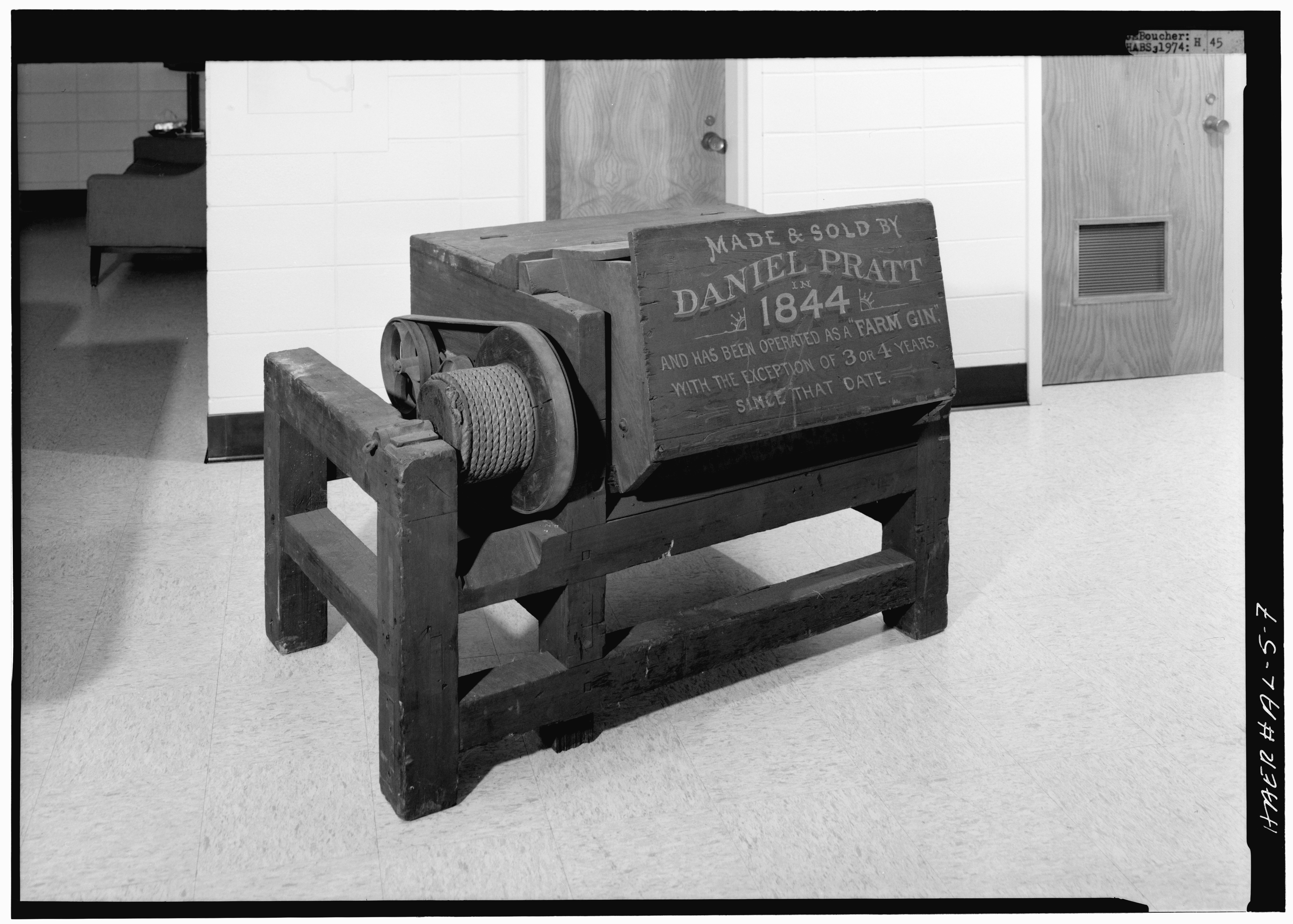
Pratt Cotton Gin Manufactured in Prattville in 1844 on display at the Alabama State Archives

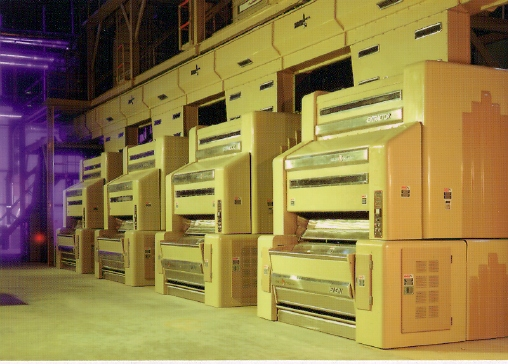
4 Stand Cotton Gin

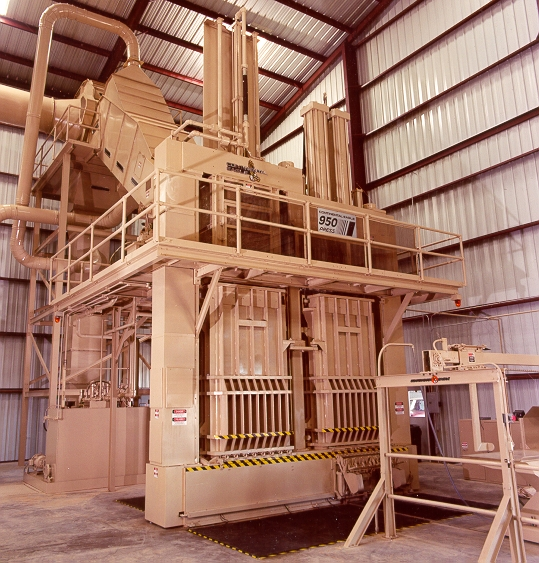
Down Packing Cotton Bale Press

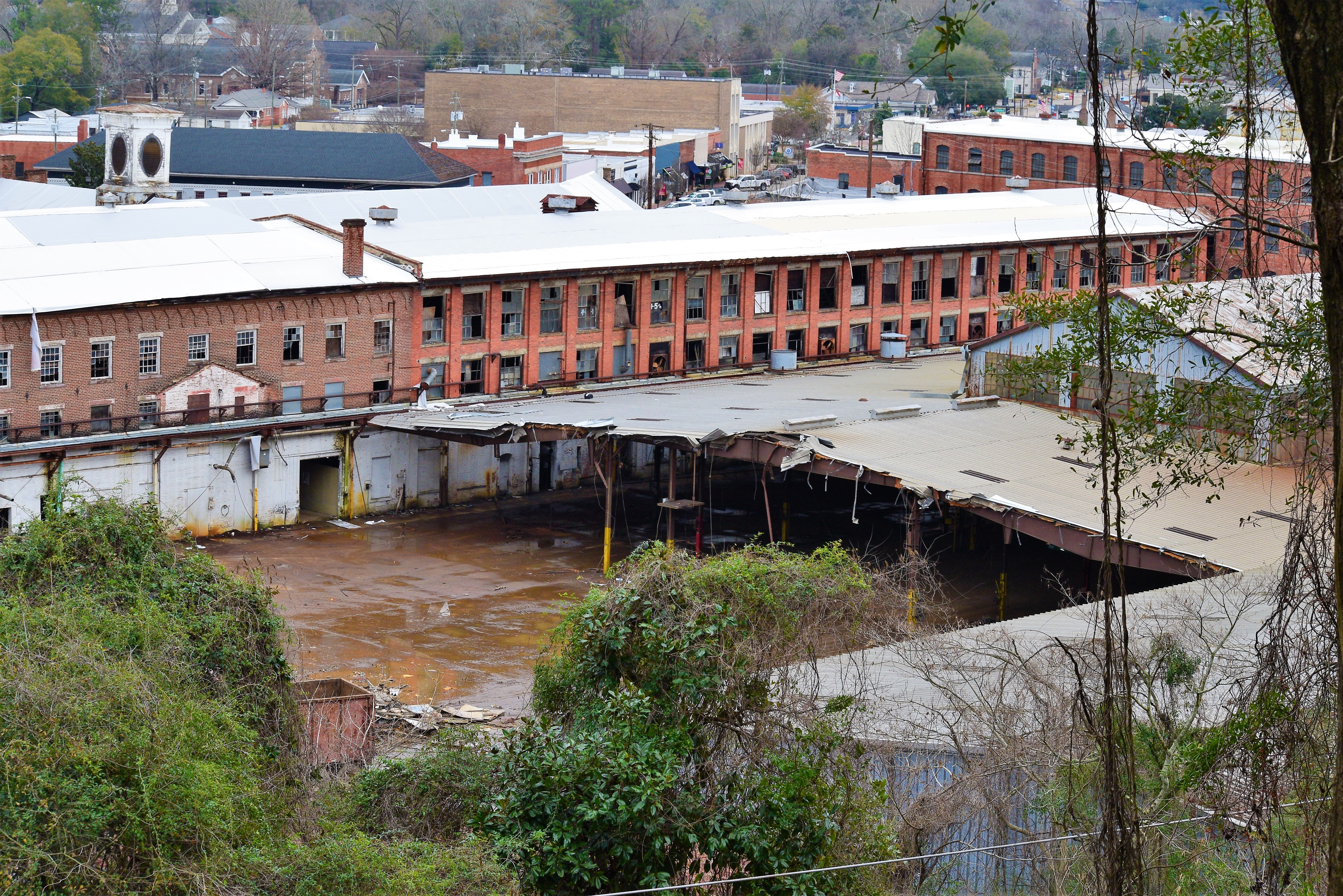
Gin Factory Project

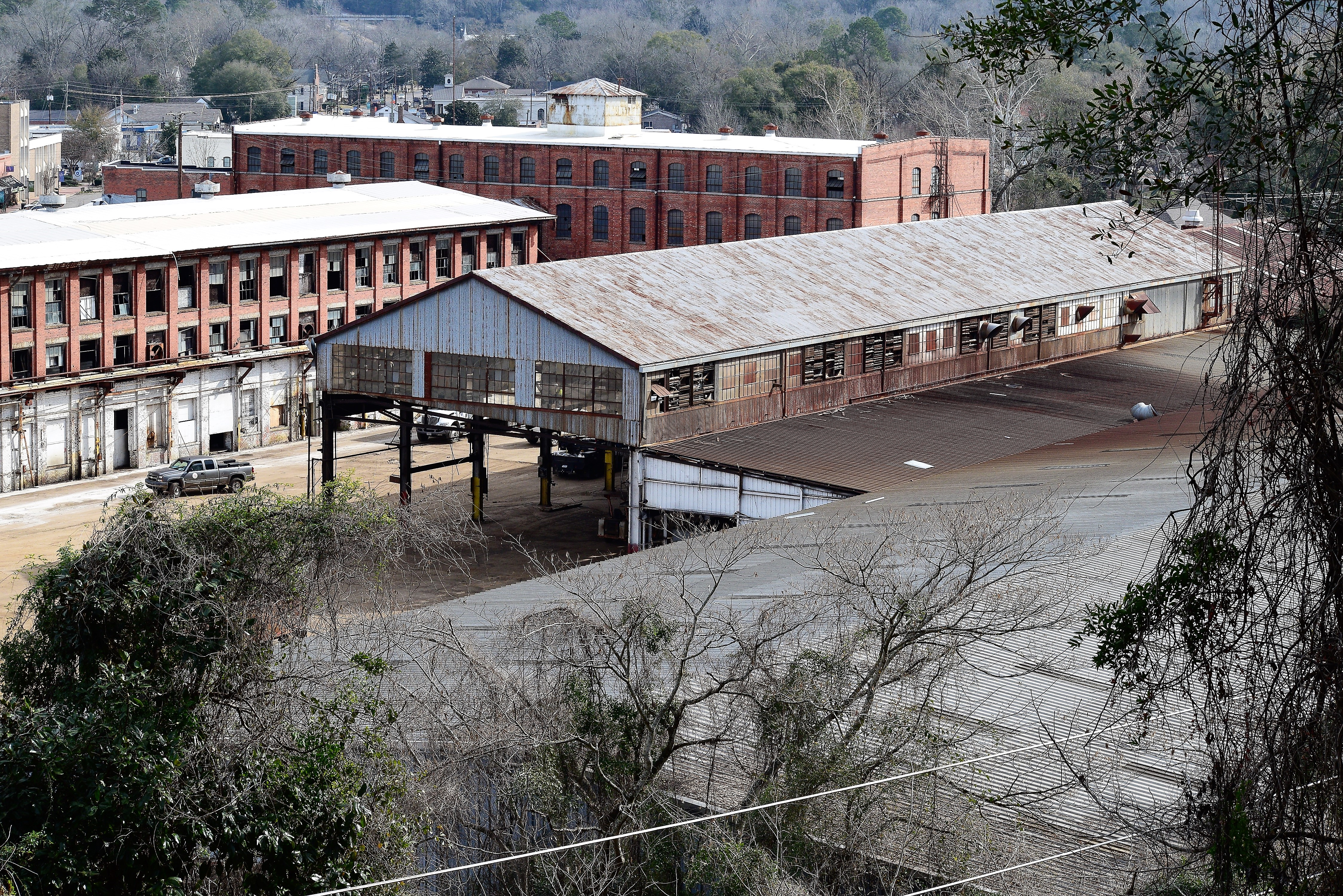
Gin Factory Project

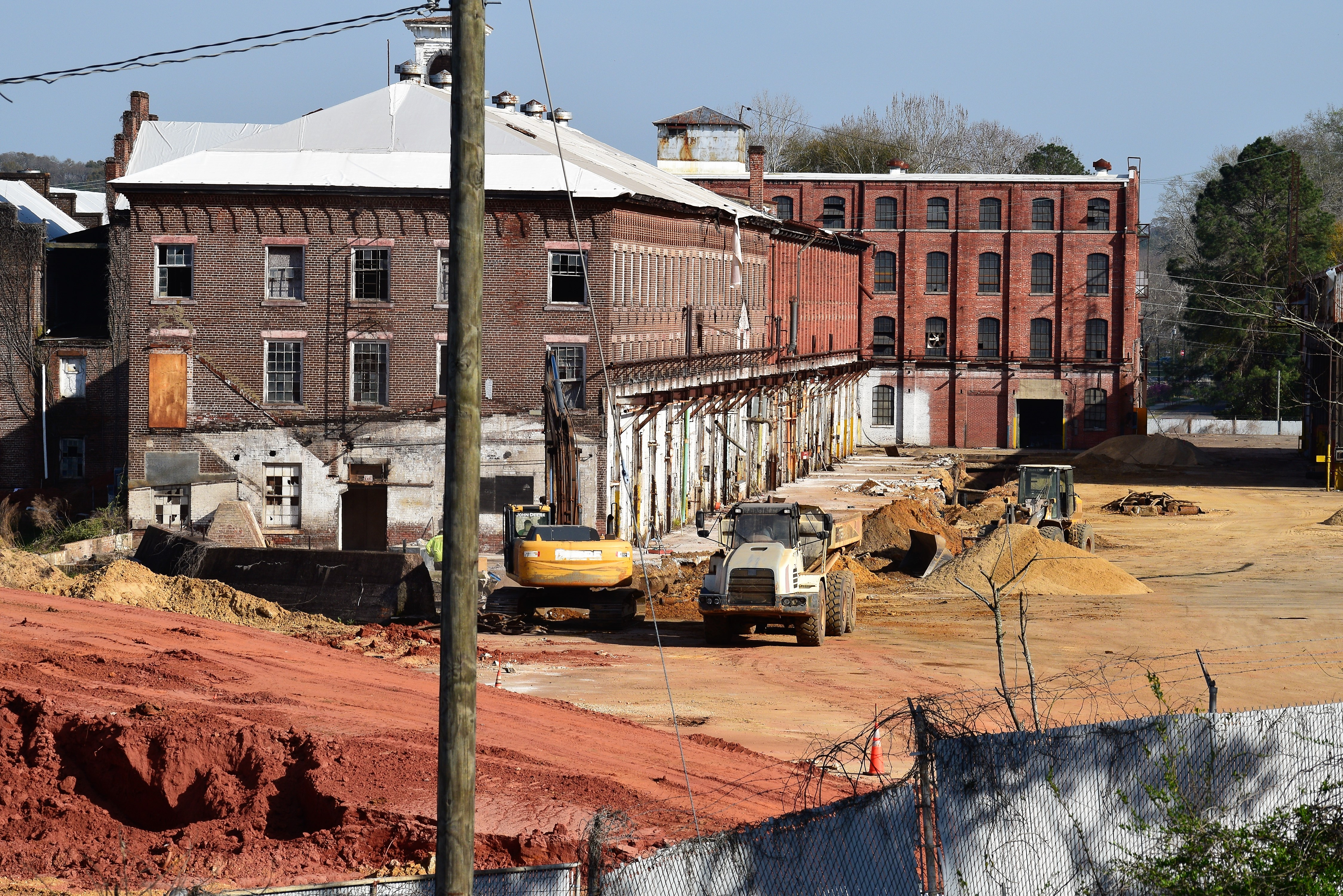
Gin Factory Project

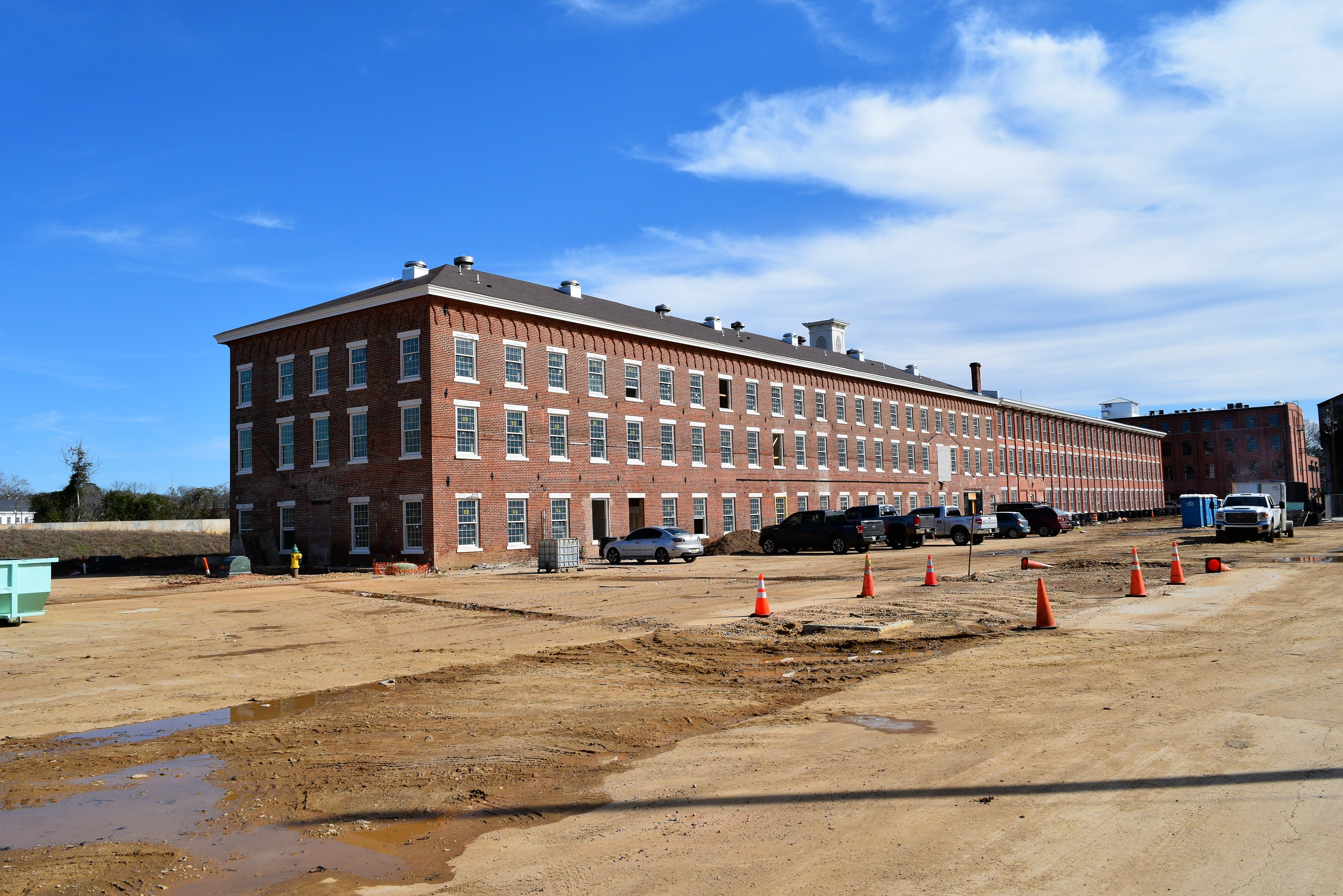
Reconstructed 1854, 1898 and 1912 buildings of the Prattville Cotton Gin Factory Project

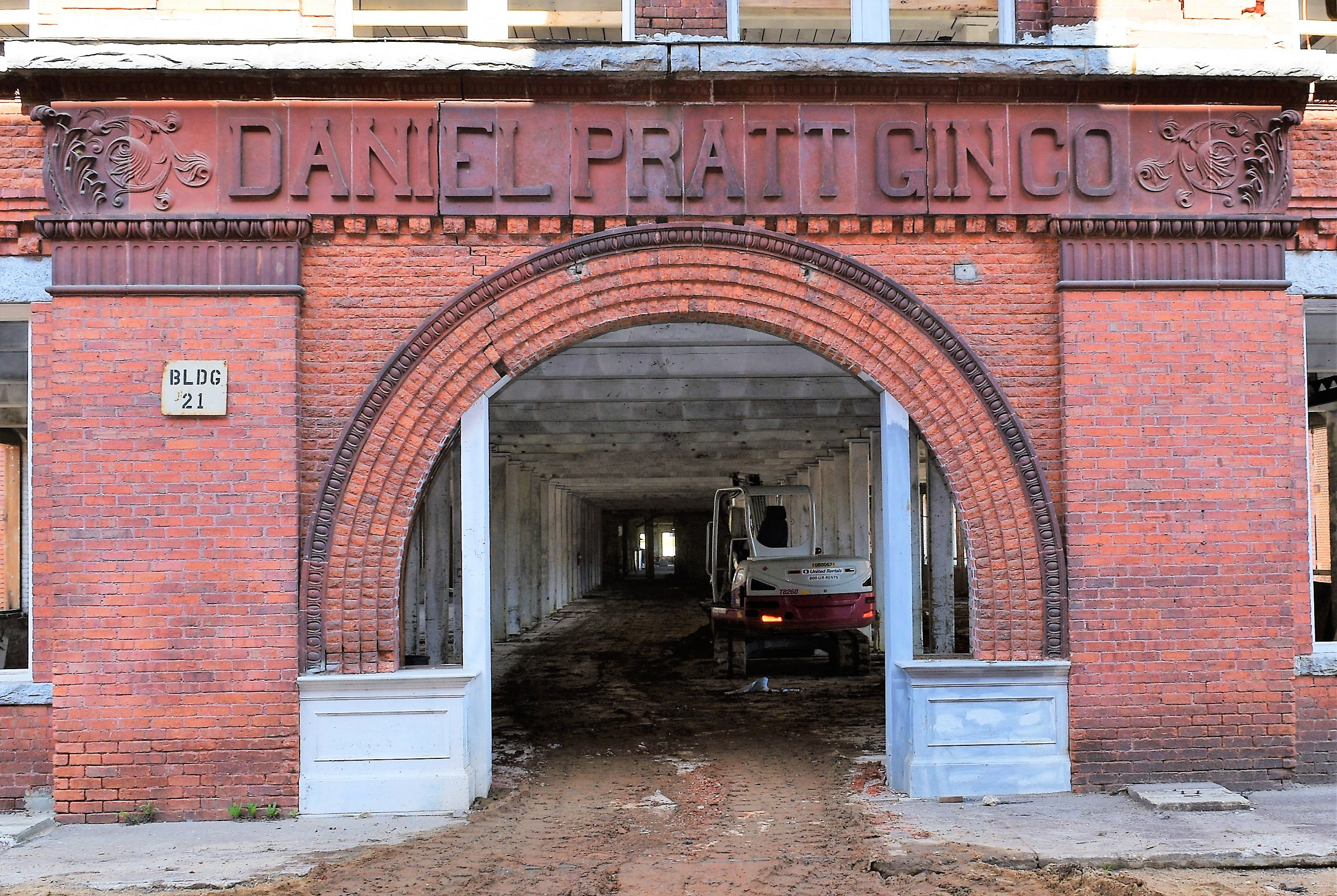
1898 entrance of the Daniel Pratt Cotton Gin Company

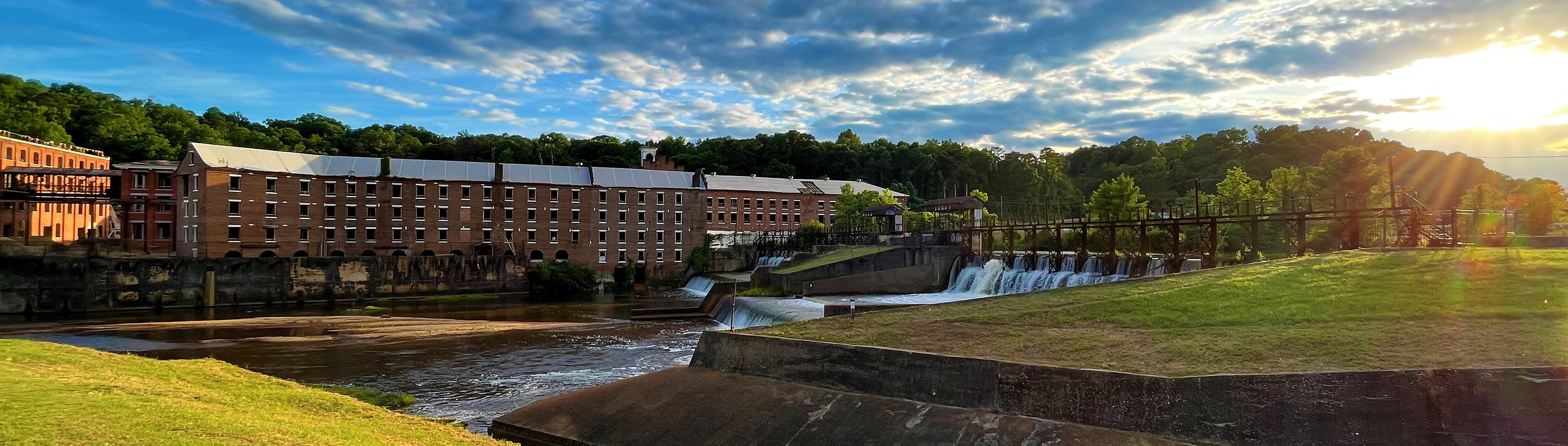
Prattville Cotton Gin Factory reconstruction; 1848, 1852, 1854 and 1912 buildings; May 2022
