= Doffing cylinder =

Textile manufacturing piece

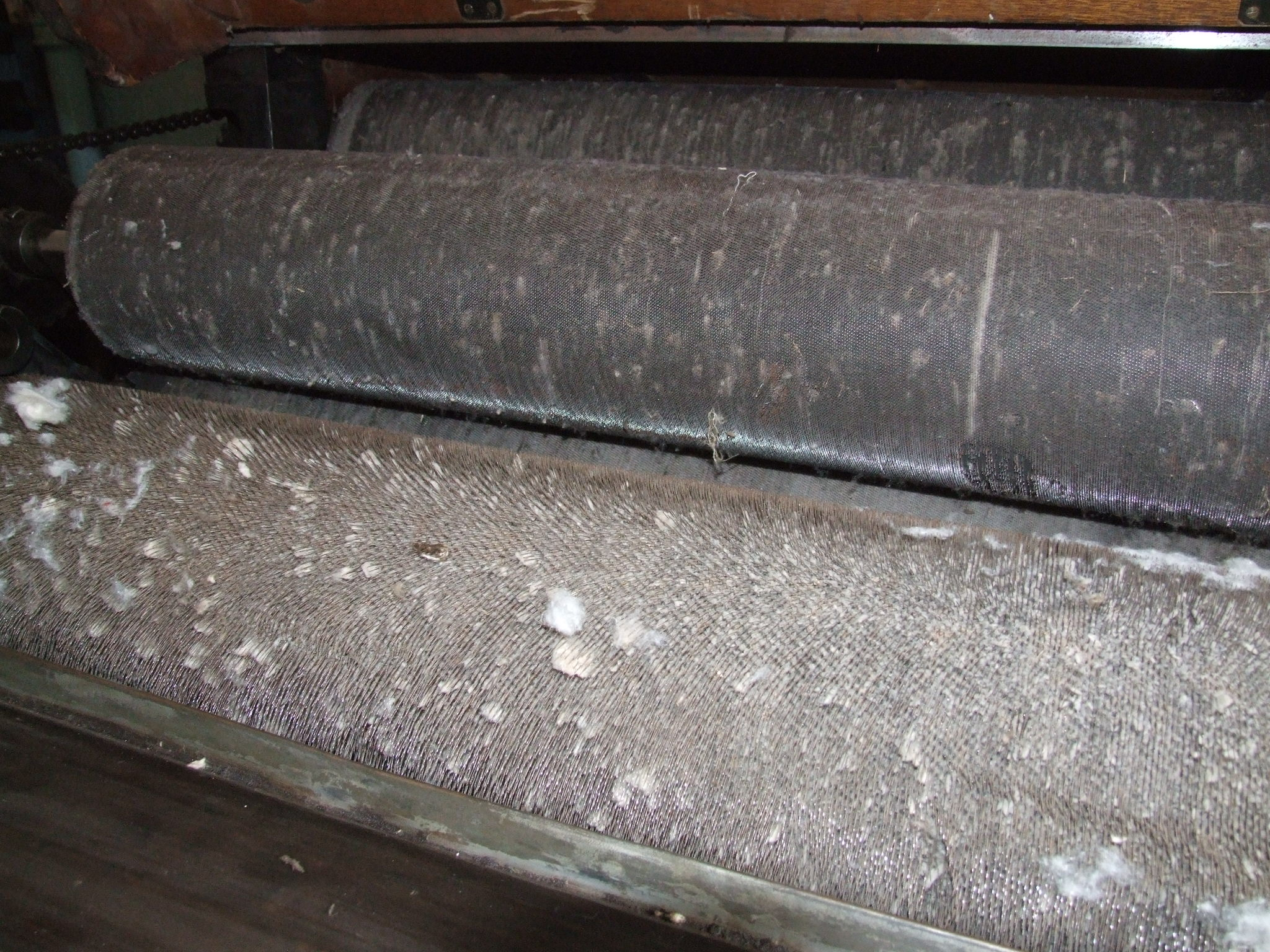
Breaker card showing the doffing cylinder with its longer fancy card and the doffing knife below, at Masson Mill in Derbyshire, England

A doffing cylinder, also called doffing roller or commonly just doffer is a component used in textile mills to remove fiber from the main cylinder of a card, on which the fibers have been straightened and aligned. The main cylinder of the card will have one or two doffers that comb and remove the fiber. The doffer is set with pins that hold the fiber, which is then removed by a comb or knife and fed into the next stage of production. Doffers are also used in cotton pickers and other machinery that handle fiber.

Confusingly, the word doffer (meaning something that takes off, as in "doff your hat") is also used for mill workers whose job it is to remove full bobbins or pirns holding spun fiber and replace them with empty bobbins or pirns. In modern mills, a machine called a doffer may do this task.

== Early years ==
Some people have given credit to Richard Arkwright for inventing the doffer, which was incorporated in his machine, but others consider that it was invented by James Hargreaves. The design was refined by Samuel Crompton shortly after 1785. Before the surface of the carding cylinder reaches the doffer it passes a "fancy roller", which brushes and raises the fibers on the cylinder so they can be transferred to the doffer more easily. In a wool mill a doffer would move relatively slowly compared to the surface of the carding cylinder, picking up the fiber. The fiber would then be removed from the doffer by a comb.

== Design improvements ==
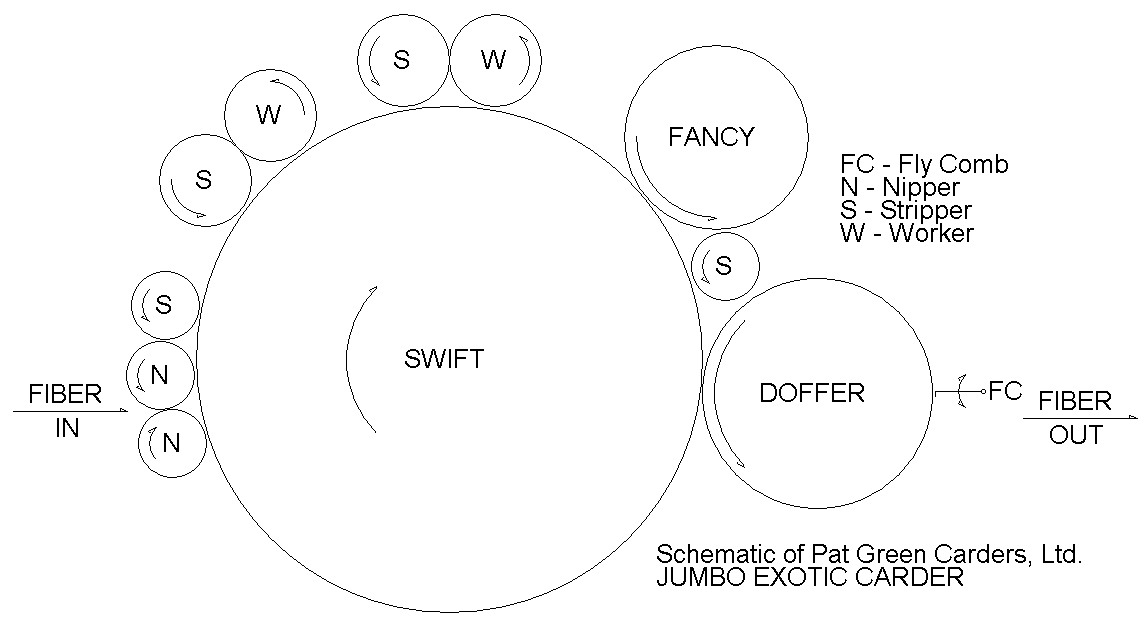
Diagram showing name, location, and rotation of rollers used on a cottage carder

At first, the card clothing for wool mills was made in the form of sheets, and when attached to the cylinder and to all the rollers including the last doffer there were gaps of about an inch between the sheets. This made it impossible to make endless slubbings. Even when it became possible to wrap the doffer with fillet clothing with no gaps, sheets with gaps continued to be used because a continuous woolen sliver was too difficult to manage through the subsequent steps.

A breakthrough was made with the ring doffer, where the surface was covered by alternating continuous rings of clothing about an inch wide, separated by spacing rings of some material like leather. The idea seems to have originated with Louis Martin in Europe in 1803, and may have been used by Arnold Pawtucket in 1812 in Rhode Island. Ezekial Hale of Haverhill, Massachusetts patented the idea in 1825. With this design, it became possible to produce continuous lengths of slubbing to feed into the next stage.

Various inventors proposed improvements. Thus, in October 1835 Stephen R. Parkhurst filed a patent for a doffer made of a set of parallel wheels with rims about four inches wide, separated by an inch or slightly more. By setting the wheels at a slight angle, the whole surface of the main cylinder would be cleared by them. This doffer would feed a system of rollers that could feed the fiber onto spools or into machines that would immediately twist it into a thread. However, the ring doffer was relatively inefficient.

== Modern doffers ==
The most common arrangement today uses a tape doffer completely wrapped in fillet clothing, producing a web the width of the card, which is then split into strips using an array of endless tapes. These tapes used to be made of leather, but today are usually of synthetic material.
