= Dead cotton =

Immature cotton that has poor dye affinity

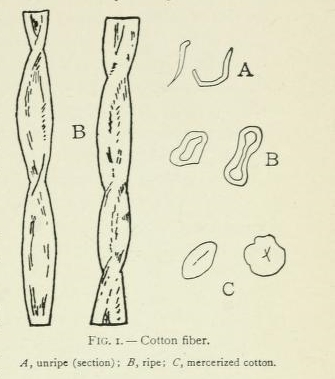
Unripe cotton

Dead cotton (Coton mort) is immature cotton or underdeveloped cotton that has poor dye affinity and appears as white specks on a dyed fabric. Daniel Koechlin (1785–1871), who was a manufacturer and a chemist in Mulhouse, established the fact in 1848 that it is dead cotton fibers that resist dye. Other chemists such as Walter Crum, Albin Haller, and Herzog explored and contributed to the subject further. Crum discovered that dead fibers have very thin cell walls.

== Grading ==
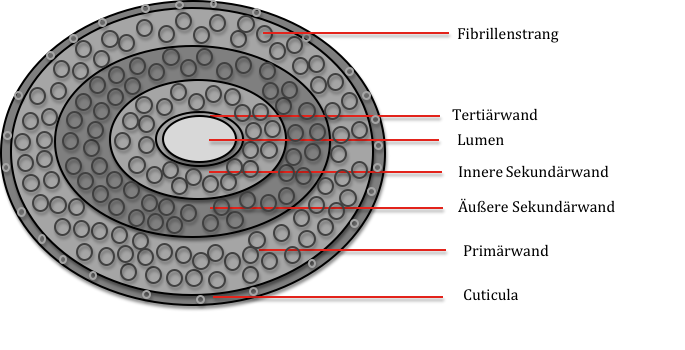
Schematic cross-section through a cotton fiber

Grading is the process of classifying cotton fibers based on certain parameters like the length of the staple, the strength of the fibers, and how even they are. There are ripe, unripe, and half-ripe cotton fibers in every lot of cotton, because the seed has fibers that grow at different maturity rates. Matured fibers are ones that have completed their growth process and have developed in all aspects. Cotton fiber has a cell wall and a lumen, and the cell wall thickens as the fiber matures. The cell wall makes up 50–80% of the cross-section of a mature cotton fiber, 30–45% of an immature cotton fiber, and less than 25% of a dead cotton fiber.

Dead or immature fibers show no tubular structure like matured fibers, instead they look like broad, solid, ribbon-like fibers which are almost transparent, with irregular twists.

=== Microscopic view ===
When cotton fibers are analyzed and assessed through a microscope, dead fibers appear differently. Dead cotton fibers have thin cell walls. In contrast, mature fibers have more cellulose and a greater degree of cell wall thickening.

Microscopic views of dead fibers exhibit extremely thin cell walls; the fibers appear as flattened and slightly twisted tapes, with collapsed lumen.

== Significance ==
Dead cotton is observed as a serious defect in dyed fabrics. The problem is that it is apparent after it has been dyed. The dead fibers are difficult to spin; they lack twist and are brittle and weak. Dead fibers cause a poor surface appearance of the textile product, with increased nep grade and uneven dyeing. Any remedial action of dead cotton is really significant.

== Remedies ==
There are a few treatments that can help mitigate the effect of dead cotton in finished products.

- In yarn spinning, a process called combing is used to remove short and undesirable fibers which is referred to as "noil". The combing helps in reducing the immature fibers.
- Mercerization is a pretreatment that alters the fiber properties and avoids dead fibers, which helps in level dyeing.
- There are certain enzymes, such as cellulase, which can cut down on the protruding fibers and consequently reduce the dead fibers. The treatment is also called "depilling" or "biopolishing".
- Chitosan after-treatment helps in increasing the exhaustion of direct dyes and reducing the white specks caused by dead cotton. It produces superior results when redyed with a modest proportion of dye following chitosan treatment.
- There are certain direct dyes which have an ability to cover/dye dead cotton.

== See also ==
- Dead wool is the wool which is pulled from a dead sheep.
- Yarn realisation
