= Pulled =

Pulled may refer to:

- Pulled rickshaw, a mode of human-powered transport
- Pulled wool, wool taken from a dead sheep
- Pulled pork, an American dish
- Pulled hamstring, a straining of the hamstring
- Pulled elbow, an elbow injury
- "Pulled", a song from the musical The Addams Family
