= Cotton classing =

Measuring and classification of cotton by its specific physical attributes

Cotton classing is the measurement and classification of cotton by its specific physical attributes. This information is attached to individual bales, thus clarifying their value and helping producers market them. For cotton buyers, i.e. the spinning mills, this precise information about the cotton fiber enables them to achieve consistent yarn quality by optimizing raw material selection and blending.

== History ==
According to the USDA, an international group of cotton industry representatives met 1907 in Atlanta, Georgia to address serious problems that had developed in the marketing of cotton. A resolution was passed which recommended the establishment of uniform cotton standards to “eliminate price differences between markets, provide a means of settling disputes, make the farmer more cognizant of the value of their product, and, therefore, put them in a better bargaining position, and in general be of great benefit to the cotton trade.” In response to this and similar calls for action over the next several years, laws were passed authorizing the USDA to develop cotton grade standards and offer cotton classification services.

Since 1991, USDA cotton classification has applied an instrument-based classing process using the so-called High Volume Instrument (HVI) by Uster Technologies.

== Classification of cotton ==
Classification of cotton, or cotton classing, is based on fiber characteristics that include staple length, strength, cotton maturity, micronaire (a measure of the cotton's fineness), color grade, color reflectance, color yellowness, and trash percent area.

In order to improve objectivity, cotton classing has largely moved from human senses (visual checks by certified classers) to high-volume, precision instruments that measure different parameters in a matter of seconds.

Cotton classing is usually organized by governmental agencies for the entire crop grown in their own countries. The first body to systematically conduct instrument-based classing was the United States Department of Agriculture (USDA), running a series of air-conditioned classification offices where the entire cotton crop is sampled and classified. Other countries running similar classification organizations include China, Australia, Uzbekistan, Brazil and Greece.

=== Staple length ===
Staple length is a term referring to the average length of a group of fibers of any composition. Short staple cotton fibers produce carded yarns that are generally irregular and have protruding hairs, hence a low yarn quality. Long-staple fibers contribute to better spinnability and strength, delivering regular yarns of superior quality. The USDA standardizes staple length as follows:

Category	Fiber length (Inches)
Very Short staple	<0.25
Short staple	0.25-0.94
Medium staple	0.94-1.13
Long staple	1.13-1.38
Extra long staple	>1.38

=== Cotton grading ===
There are 39 cotton color grades.

Color is described as white, light spotted, spotted, tinged, or yellow. Color is also described in terms of lightness to darkness: plus, light gray, and gray.

— Textiles by Kadolph, Sara J

=== Cotton maturity ===
The maturity of individual cotton fiber is an essential aspect of cotton classing. Cotton maturity also contributes to the aesthetics of the product. For instance, it may affect appearance. Therefore, immature cotton that does not absorb dye is called ''dead fiber'', ''dead cotton'', and ''mote fibers.''

== See also ==
- Cotton maturity, analytical measurements of cotton fiber properties.
