= Cotton maturity =

One of the analytical measurements of cotton fiber properties

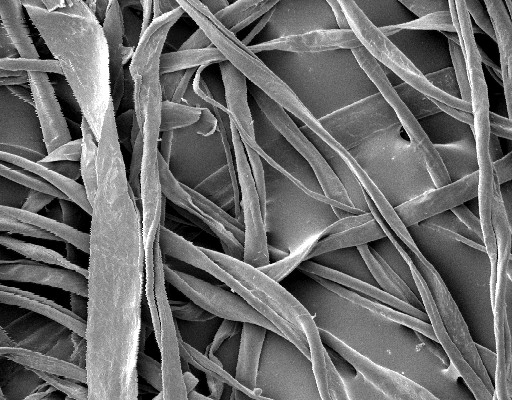
Cotton fibers viewed under a scanning electron microscope

Cotton maturity is a physical testing parameter of cotton fiber properties testing. It is quantified by the degree of cell wall thickening relative to its perimeter. The maturity of individual cotton fiber is an essential aspect of the cotton classing regarding the aesthetics such as appearance, dye-uptake, etc. High volume instrument (HVI) can test cotton maturity like many other fiber properties, including length, uniformity, micronaire/fineness, strength, color, etc.

== Major impact ==
Cotton maturity of fibers largely depends upon the growing conditions. Cotton maturity is measured as the relative wall thickness (i.e., the area of the cell wall to that of a circle with the same perimeter as the fiber, or the ratio of the cell wall thickness to the overall ‘diameter’ of the fiber). Hence the thickness of the wall infers the extent of the maturity of cotton fibers. Cotton fibers are trichome cells composed primarily of cellulose. Mature fibers have more cellulose and a greater degree of cell wall thickening. The significant impact of immature fiber is on the finished appearance. The MIC values of immature fibers determine the processing and performance of cotton. The commonly caused defects by immature cotton are related to yarn and fabric appearance such as poor dyeing uptake, dead fibers, neps formation, and barre also (if the batch to batch maturity ratio is different).

== Measurements ==
Cotton classification, or classing, is the process of classifying cotton based on its grade, staple length, and micronaire. Micronaire is a measure of cotton maturity. Maturity of cotton fibers is measured with single fiber measurement test or by double compression air flow test. It is expressed in percentage or maturity ratio.

=== Micronaire ===
Cotton's simple Micronaire value is determined by both the fineness of the fibres as well as their maturity. Micronaire values or reading represents the fineness of the cotton fiber. For example, a preferred micronaire range is 3.7 to 4.2. Upland cotton is coarser than Gossypium barbadense (Pima cotton).

== See also ==
- Christophe Moulherat
