= History of cotton =

The history of cotton can be traced from its domestication, through the important role it played in the history of India, the British Empire, and the United States, to its continuing importance as a crop and agricultural commercial product.

The history of the domestication of cotton is very complex and is not known exactly. Several isolated civilizations in both the Old and New World independently domesticated and converted the cotton into fabric. All the same tools were invented to work it also, including combs, bows, hand spindles, and primitive looms.

Cotton has been cultivated and used by humans for thousands of years, with evidence of cotton fabrics dating back to ancient civilizations in India, Egypt, and Peru. The cotton industry played a significant role in the development of the American economy, with the production of cotton being the major source of income for slave owners in the southern United States prior to the Civil War, while the transport of said cotton to mills in the Northern United States and Europe and beyond became a mainstay of American shipping. Today, cotton remains an important crop worldwide, with China and India being the largest producers.

== Etymology ==
The word "cotton" has Arabic origins, derived from the Arabic word قطن (qutn or qutun). This was the usual word for cotton in medieval Arabic. The word entered the Romance languages in the mid-12th century, and English a century later. Cotton fabric was known to the ancient Romans as an import but cotton was rare in the Romance-speaking lands until imports from the Arabic-speaking lands in the later medieval era at transformatively lower prices.

== Early history ==
The oldest cotton textiles were found in graves and city ruins of civilizations from dry climates, where the fabrics did not decay completely.

=== Americas ===
The oldest cotton fabric has been found in Huaca Prieta in Peru, dated to about 6000 BCE. It is here that Gossypium barbadense is thought to have been domesticated at its earliest. Some of the oldest cotton bolls were discovered in a cave in Tehuacán Valley, Mexico, and were dated to approximately 5500 BCE, but some doubt has been cast on these estimates. Seeds and cordage dating to about 2500 BCE have been found in Peru. By 3000 BCE cotton was being grown and processed in Mexico, and Arizona.

=== Kingdom of Kush ===
Cotton (Gossypium herbaceum Linnaeus) may have been domesticated around 5000 BCE in eastern Sudan near the Middle Nile Basin region, where cotton cloth was being produced. The cultivation of cotton and the knowledge of its spinning and weaving in Meroë reached a high level in the 4th century BC. The export of textiles was one of the sources of wealth for Meroë. Aksumite King Ezana boasted in his inscription that he destroyed large cotton plantations in Meroë during his conquest of the region.

=== Near East ===
Microremains of cotton fibers, some dyed, have been found at Tel Tsaf in the Jordan Valley dated 5,200 BCE. They may be the remnants of ancient clothing, fabric containers, or cordage. Researches suggest the cotton might come from wild species in South Asia, and trade with the Indus Valley.

=== Indian subcontinent ===
The earliest archaeological discovery, a number of mineralised cotton threads, recovered from the center of a string of eight copper beads, found in a grave, dated to the first half of the 6th millennium BC, at Mehrgarh, Kachi, Pakistan, demonstrates use of wild or cultivated cotton fibres, was known, millennia before evidence of cotton cultivation, and textiles, in the 4th millennia BC, Indus Valley Civilisation.

Herodotus, an ancient Greek historian, mentions Indian cotton in the 5th century BCE as "a wool exceeding in beauty and goodness that of sheep", which suggests that the fiber was not yet known in Greece at the time. When Alexander the Great invaded India, his troops started wearing cotton clothes that were more comfortable than their previous woolen ones. Strabo, another Greek historian, mentioned the vividness of Indian fabrics, and Arrian told of Indian–Arab trade of cotton fabrics in 130 CE.

== Middle Ages ==
=== Eastern world ===
Handheld roller cotton gins had been used in India since the 6th century, and was then introduced to other countries from there. Between the 12th and 14th centuries, dual-roller gins appeared in India and China. The Indian version of the dual-roller gin was prevalent throughout the Mediterranean cotton trade by the 16th century. This mechanical device was, in some areas, driven by water power.

=== Western world ===
Cotton entered Europe (the "West") through Africa and the Mediterranean; it had been used in Sudan for thousands of years and Egyptians grew and spun cotton from at least 700 CE onward.

Cotton was not a common fabric in Europe at any point until the 18th century, though it did see occasional import and use during the late Middle Ages, often in blends with other fibers. Confusingly, from the 14th to 19th centuries, "cotton" was also a term used for woolen fabrics of a certain weave or texture, and therefore has confused past generations of scholars.

Cotton manufacture was introduced to Europe during the Muslim conquest of the Iberian Peninsula and Sicily. The knowledge of cotton weaving was spread to northern Italy in the 12th century, when Sicily was conquered by the Normans, and consequently to the rest of Europe. The spinning wheel, introduced to Europe c. 1350, improved the speed of cotton spinning. By the 15th century, Venice, Antwerp, and Haarlem were important ports for cotton trade, and the sale and transportation of cotton fabrics had become profitable.

Christopher Columbus, in his explorations of the Bahamas and Cuba, found natives wearing cotton ("the costliest and handsomest... cotton mantles and sleeveless shirts embroidered and painted in different designs and colours"), a fact that may have contributed to his incorrect belief that he had landed on the coast of India.

== Early modern period ==
=== India ===
Cotton was known to Indian as कर्पास From Pali kappāsa (“cotton”), from Sanskrit कर्पास (karpāsa, “cotton”), India had been an exporter of fine cotton fabrics to other countries since ancient times. Sources such as Marco Polo, who traveled throughout India in the 13th century, Chinese travelers, who traveled to Buddhist pilgrim centers in India even earlier, Vasco Da Gama, who entered Calicut in 1498, and Tavernier, who visited India in the 17th century, praised the superiority of Indian fabrics.

The worm gear roller cotton gin, or churka, came into use in India between the 13th and 17th centuries and is still used in India in the present day. The incorporation of the crank handle in the churka first appeared in India sometime during the late Delhi Sultanate or the early Mughal Empire. The production of cotton, which may have largely been spun in villages and then taken to towns in the form of yarn to be woven into cloth textiles, was advanced by the diffusion of the spinning wheel across India shortly before the Mughal era, lowering the costs of yarn and helping to increase demand for cotton. The diffusion of the spinning wheel, and the incorporation of the worm gear and crank handle into the roller cotton gin, greatly expanded Indian cotton textile production during the Mughal era. During the 19th century, two people using a churka could produce 28 pounds of cotton per day.

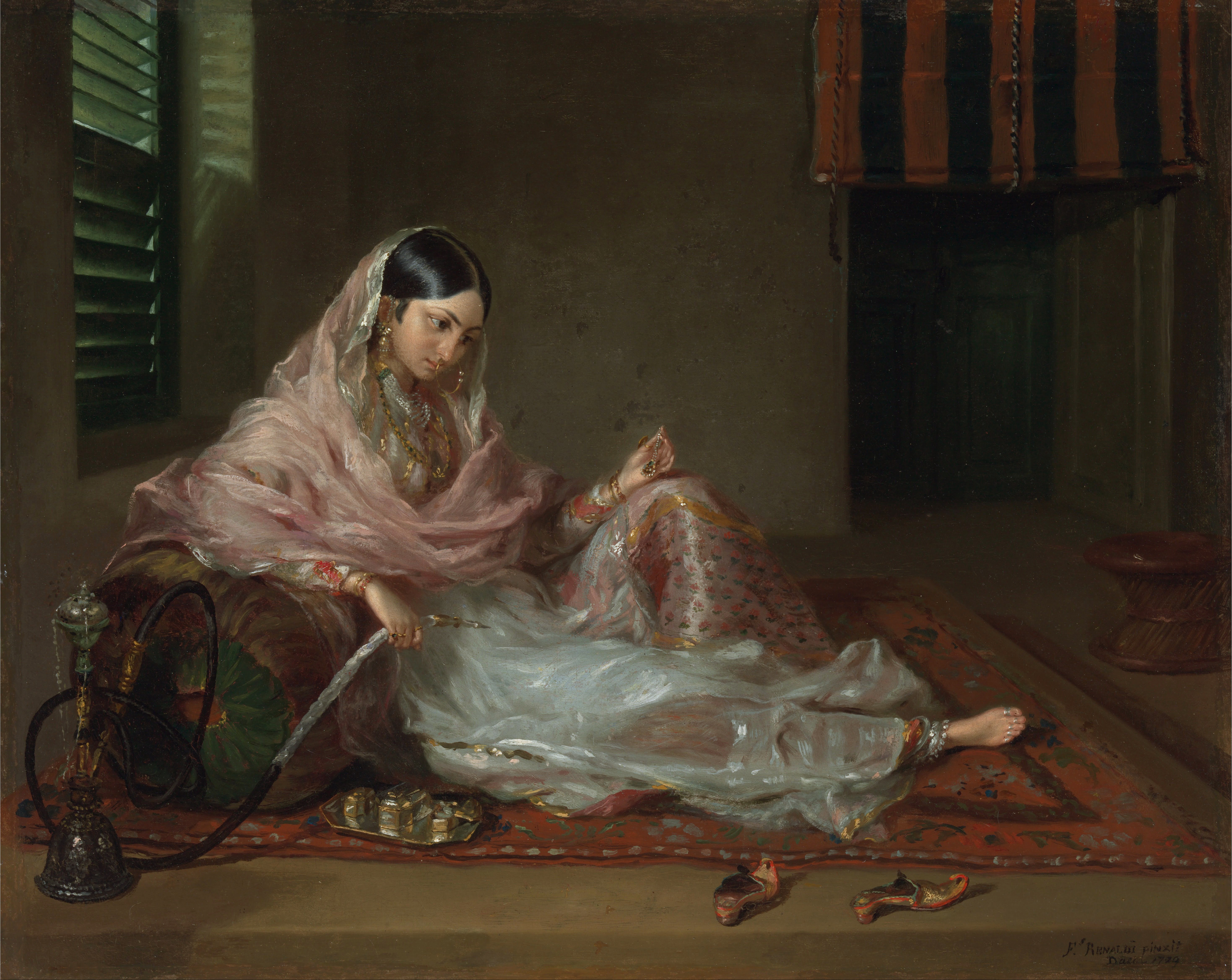
A woman in Dhaka clad in fine Bengali muslin, 18th century.

During the early 16th century to the early 18th century, Indian cotton production increased, in terms of both raw cotton and cotton textiles. The Mughals introduced agrarian reforms such as a new revenue system that was biased in favour of higher value cash crops such as cotton and indigo, providing state incentives to grow cash crops, in addition to rising market demand.

The largest manufacturing industry in the Mughal Empire was cotton textile manufacturing, which included the production of piece goods, calicos, and muslins, available unbleached and in a variety of colours. The cotton textile industry was responsible for a large part of the empire's international trade. India had a 25% share of the global textile trade in the early 18th century. Indian cotton textiles were the most important manufactured goods in world trade in the 18th century, consumed across the world from the Americas to Japan. The most important center of cotton production was the Bengal Subah province, particularly around its capital city of Dhaka.

Bengal accounted for more than 50% of textiles imported by the Dutch from Asia, Bengali cotton textiles were exported in large quantities to Europe, Indonesia, and Japan, and Bengali Muslin textiles from Dhaka were sold in Central Asia, where they were known as "daka" textiles. Indian textiles dominated the Indian Ocean trade for centuries, were sold in the Atlantic Ocean trade, and had a 38% share of the West African trade in the early 18th century, while Indian calicos were a major force in Europe, and Indian textiles accounted for 20% of total English trade with Southern Europe in the early 18th century.

=== Western world ===
Cotton cloth started to become highly sought after for the European urban markets during the Renaissance and the Enlightenment. Vasco da Gama (d. 1524), a Portuguese explorer, opened Asian sea trade, which replaced caravans and allowed for heavier cargo. Indian craftspeople had long protected the secret of how to create colourful patterns. However, some converted to Christianity and their secret was revealed by a French Catholic priest, Father Coeurdoux (1691–1779). He revealed the process of creating the fabrics in France, while assisting the European textile industry.

In early modern Europe, there was significant demand for cotton textiles such as chintz from Mughal India. European fashion, for example, became increasingly dependent on Mughal Indian textiles. From the late 17th century to the early 18th century, Mughal India accounted for 95% of British imports from Asia, and the Bengal Subah province alone accounted for 40% of Dutch imports from Asia. In contrast, there was very little demand for European goods in Mughal India, which was largely self-sufficient, thus Europeans had very little to offer, except for some woolens, unprocessed metals and a few luxury items. The trade imbalance caused Europeans to export large quantities of gold and silver to Mughal India in order to pay for South Asian imports. Devoid of international competition and innovation, the Mughal cotton industry stagnated at the turn of the 18th century, and began losing ground to European industry.

=== Egypt ===
Egypt under Muhammad Ali in the early 19th century had the fifth most productive cotton industry in the world, in terms of the number of spindles per capita. The industry was initially driven by machinery that relied on traditional energy sources, such as animal power, water wheels, and windmills, which were also the principal energy sources in Western Europe up until around 1870. It was under Muhammad Ali of Egypt in the early 19th century that steam engines were introduced to the Egyptian cotton industry.

== British Empire ==
=== East India Company ===
Cotton's rise to importance in Europe came about as a result of the cultural transformation of Europe and Britain's trading empire. Calico and chintz, types of cotton fabrics, became popular in Europe, and by 1664 the East India Company was importing a quarter of a million pieces into Britain. By the 18th century, the middle class had become more concerned with cleanliness and fashion, and there was a demand for easily washable and colourful fabric. Wool continued to dominate the European markets, but cotton prints were introduced to Britain by the East India Company in the 1690s. Imports of calicoes, cheap cotton fabrics from Kozhikode, then known as Calicut, in India, found a mass market among the poor. By 1721 these calicoes threatened British manufacturers, and Parliament passed the Calico Act that banned calicoes for clothing or domestic purposes. In 1774 the act was repealed with the invention of machines that allowed for British manufacturers to compete with Eastern fabrics.

Indian cotton textiles, particularly those from Bengal, continued to maintain a competitive advantage up until the 19th century. In order to compete with India, Britain invested in labour-saving technical progress, while implementing protectionist policies such as bans and tariffs to restrict Indian imports. At the same time, the East India Company's rule in India opened up a new market for British goods, while the capital amassed from its rule was used to invest in British industries such as textile manufacturing and greatly increase British wealth. British colonization also forced open the large Indian market to British goods, which could be sold in India without tariffs or duties, compared to local Indian producers, while raw cotton was imported from India without tariffs to British factories which manufactured textiles from Indian cotton, giving Britain a monopoly over India's large market and cotton resources. India served as both a significant supplier of raw goods to British manufacturers and a large captive market for British manufactured goods, though it took in only a small fraction of Britain's textiles and almost no other exports. Britain eventually surpassed India as the world's leading cotton textile manufacturer in the 19th century.

The cotton industry grew under the British commercial empire. British cotton products were successful in European markets, constituting 40.5% of exports in 1784–1786. Britain's success was also due to its trade with its own colonies, whose settlers maintained British identities, and thus, fashions. With the growth of the cotton industry, manufacturers had to find new sources of raw cotton, and cultivation was expanded to West India. High tariffs against Indian textile workshops, British power in India through the East India Company, and British restrictions on Indian cotton imports transformed India from the source of textiles to a source of raw cotton. Cultivation was also attempted in the Caribbean and West Africa, but these attempts failed due to bad weather and poor soil. The Indian subcontinent was looked to as a possible source of raw cotton, but intra-imperial conflicts and economic rivalries prevented the area from producing the necessary supply.

=== British cotton goods ===
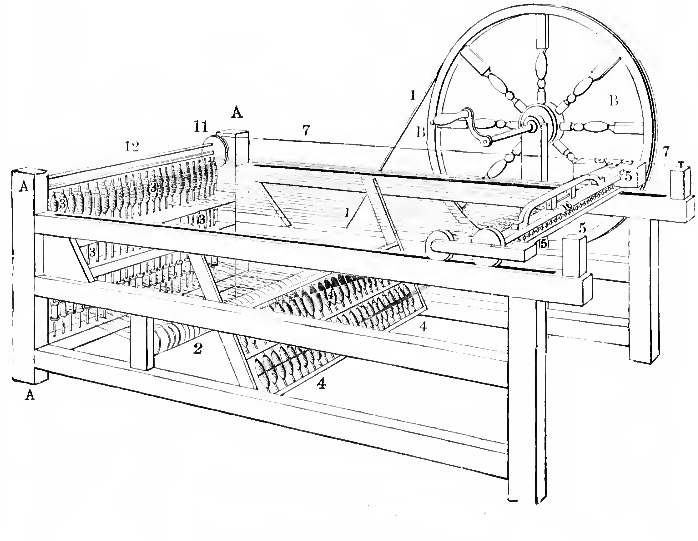
A spinning jenny, originally invented by James Hargreaves

Cotton's versatility allowed it to be combined with linen and be made into velvet. It was cheaper than silk and could be imprinted more easily than wool, allowing for patterned dresses for women. It became the standard fashion and, because of its price, was accessible to the general public. New inventions in the 1770s—such as the spinning jenny, the water frame, and the spinning mule—made the British Midlands into a very profitable manufacturing centre. In 1794–1796, British cotton goods accounted for 15.6% of Britain's exports, and in 1804–1806 grew to 42.3%.

The Lancashire textile mills were major parts of the British industrial revolution. Their workers had poor working conditions: low wages, child labour, and 18-hour work days. Richard Arkwright created a textile empire by building a factory system powered by water, which was occasionally raided by the Luddites, weavers put out of business by the mechanization of textile production. In the 1790s, James Watt's steam power was applied to textile production. By 1839, thousands of children worked in Manchester's cotton mills. Karl Marx, who visited Lancashire often, may have been influenced by the conditions of workers in these mills in writing Das Kapital. Child labour in Britain was banned during the middle of the 19th century.

== United States ==
=== Pre–Civil War ===
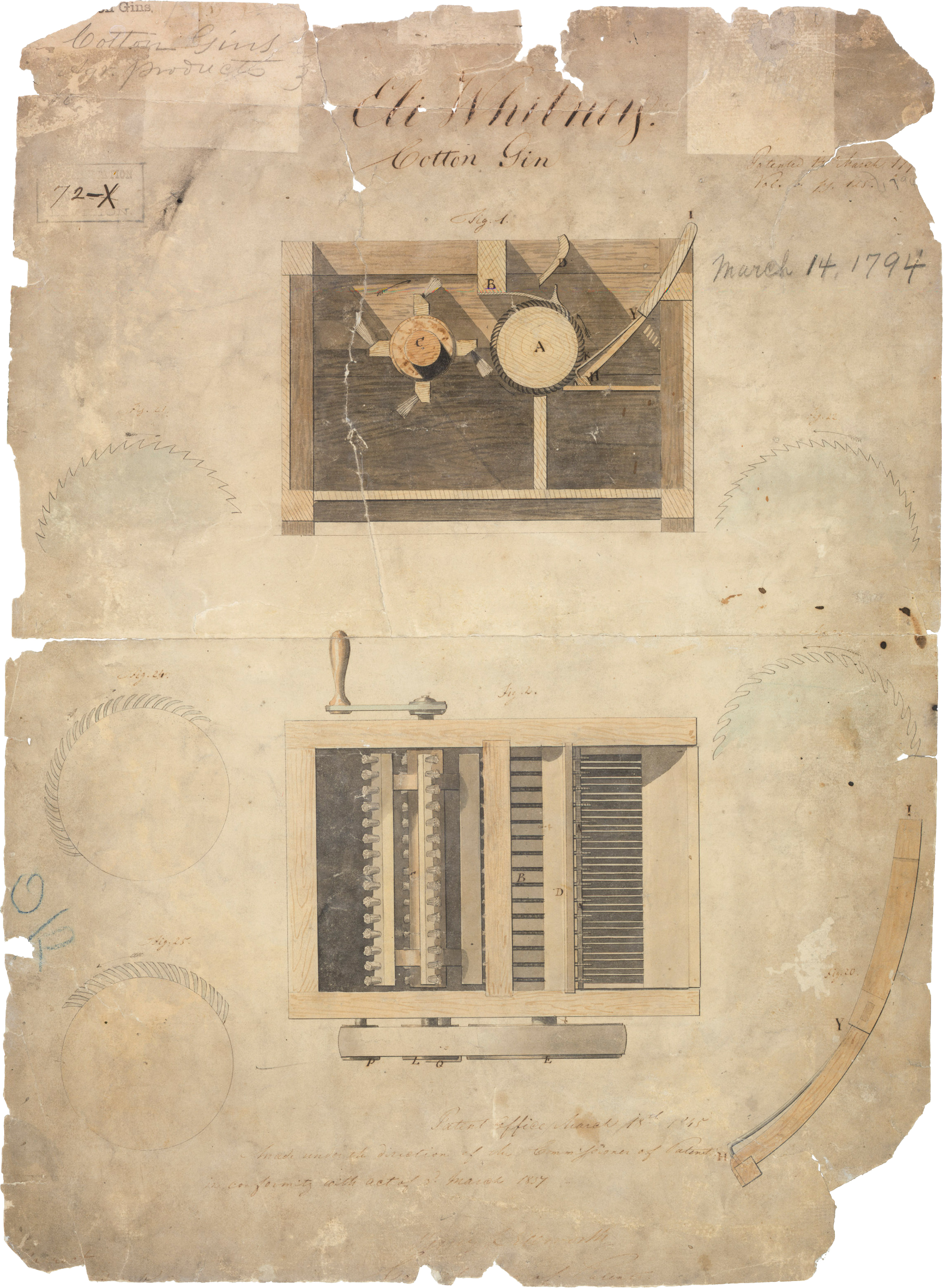
Eli Whitney's patent for the modern cotton gin

Anglo-French warfare in the early 1790s restricted access to continental Europe, causing the United States to become an important—and temporarily the largest—consumer for British cotton goods. In 1791, U.S. cotton production was small, at only 900 thousand kilograms (2.0 million pounds). Several factors contributed to the growth of the cotton industry in the U.S.: the increasing British demand; innovations in spinning, weaving, and steam power; inexpensive land; and a slave labour force. The modern cotton gin, invented in 1793 by Eli Whitney, enormously grew the American cotton industry, which was previously limited by the speed of manual removal of seeds from the fibre, and helped cotton to surpass tobacco as the primary cash crop of the South. By 1801, the annual production of cotton had reached over 22 million kilograms (49 million pounds); by the early 1830s, the United States produced the majority of the world's cotton. Cotton also exceeded the value of all other United States exports combined. The need for fertile land conducive to its cultivation led to the expansion of slavery in the United States and an early 19th-century land rush known as Alabama Fever.

Cultivation of cotton using enslaved Africans and their descendants brought huge profits to the owners of large plantations, making them some of the wealthiest men in the country prior to the Civil War. In the "free" states, farms rarely grew larger than what could be cultivated by one family due to a scarcity of farm workers. In the slave states, owners of farms could buy slave laborers and thus cultivate large areas of land. By the 1850s, slaves made up 50% of the population of the main cotton states: Georgia, Alabama, Mississippi, and Louisiana. An unpaid labor force was thought to be the most important asset in cotton cultivation, and even outside of cotton-cultivating areas slaveowners were able to profit by selling their enslaved laborers further south and west to meet the labor demands of the core cotton-producers. Thus, the cotton industry contributed significantly to the Southern upper class's support of slavery. Although the Southern small-farm owners did not grow cotton due to its lack of short-term profitability, they were still supportive of the system in the hopes of one day owning slaves.

Slaves were forbidden to make personal use of commercial cotton, which was selected to produce fibers as white as possible, but it seems that their use of cotton with naturally colored fibers was tolerated. Ironically, today, these heirloom varieties are the subject of not only collectors' passions but also renewed interest for high-end niche markets with the hope to produce textiles of lower environmental impact or fibers with sought-after unusual properties (e.g., UV protection).

Cotton's central place in the national economy and its international importance led Senator James Henry Hammond of South Carolina to make a famous boast in 1858 about King Cotton:

Without firing a gun, without drawing a sword, should they make war on us, we could bring the whole world to our feet... What would happen if no cotton was furnished for three years?... England would topple headlong and carry the whole civilized world with her save the South. No, you dare not to make war on cotton. No power on the earth dares to make war upon it. Cotton is king.

=== During the Civil War ===
Cotton diplomacy, the idea that cotton would cause the main European purchasers, Britain and France, to intervene in the Civil War, was unsuccessful, as they turned to importing cotton from India and Egypt.

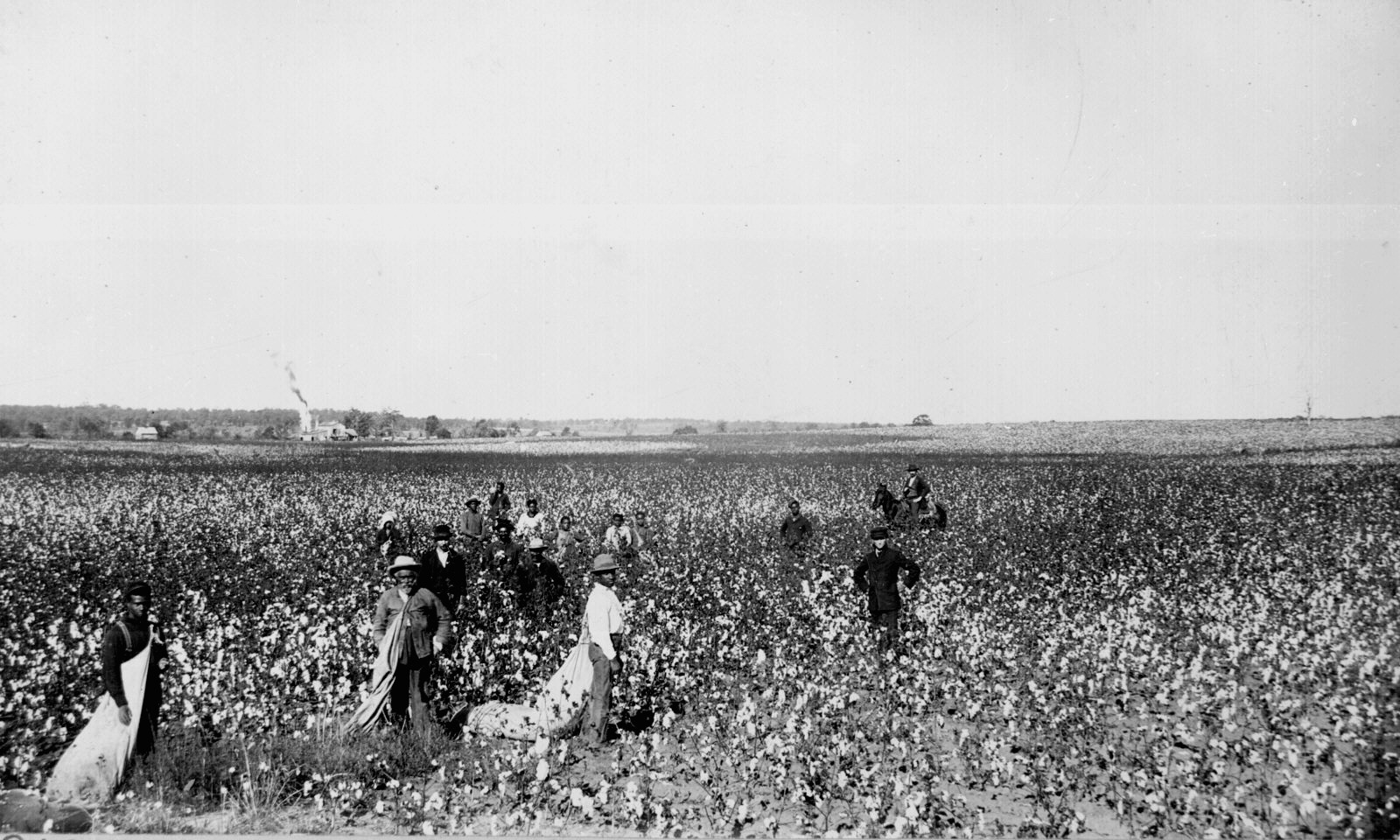
Picking cotton in Oklahoma in the 1890s

The Civil War has been blamed for the Lancashire Cotton Famine, a period between 1861 and 1865 of depression in the British cotton industry, because it cut off access to American raw cotton. Some, however, suggest that the Cotton Famine was mostly due to overproduction and price inflation caused by an expectation of future shortage. Prior to the Civil War, Lancashire companies had issued surveys to find new cotton-growing countries in case rising tension were to reduce American exports. India was deemed capable of growing the necessary amounts. Indeed, it helped fill the gap during the war, making up only 31% of British cotton imports in 1861, but 90% in 1862 and 67% in 1864.

=== Post–Civil War ===
After the American Civil War ended in 1865, British and French traders abandoned Egyptian cotton and returned to importing cheap American cotton, sending Egypt into a deficit spiral that led to the country declaring bankruptcy in 1876, a key factor behind Egypt's occupation by the British Empire in 1882.

Many former slaves as well as poor whites worked in the sharecropping system in serf-like conditions. The South continued to be a one-crop economy until the 20th century, when the boll weevil struck across the South. The New Deal and World War II encouraged diversification. In the 1940s the arrival of efficient cotton picker equipment ended the need for many workers, who then left for urban jobs.

== Spain ==
Cotton textile production was primarily concentrated in Catalonia and by the mid-19th century, led to Catalonia becoming the main industrial region of Spain. In addition a large cotton textile factory existed in Malaga in latter half of the 19th century.

The origins of this industry can be traced back to the early 18th century when printed cloth chintz was produced in Barcelona. This was driven by government bans on imported chintz from India and the opening of trading opportunities with Spain's American colonies to Catalan merchants. Initially, spinning was not a significant part of this industry, but it gained momentum in the early 19th century with the introduction of English spinning technology. Industrialisation occurred in the 1830s after adoption of the factory system, and the removal of restrictions by Britain on the emigration of expert labour (1825) and of machinery (1842). Steam power was introduced, but the cost of imported coal and steam engines, led to a shift towards the use of water power from the late 1860s. Government policy saw the proliferation of more than 75 industrial colonies on the rivers of rural Catalonia seeking water power, cheaper labour and land and led to the industrialisation of the country side.

From the middle of the 19th century the industry was increasingly protected as the costs of importing raw cotton, energy & machinery to Spain made it difficult to compete globally. From the Great Depression, the industry declined. There was increasing strife in Spain, a declining economy, civil war and then from 1939, the policy of autarky locked the industry out of the post WW2 global growth and investment.

== Modern history ==
=== Boll weevils ===
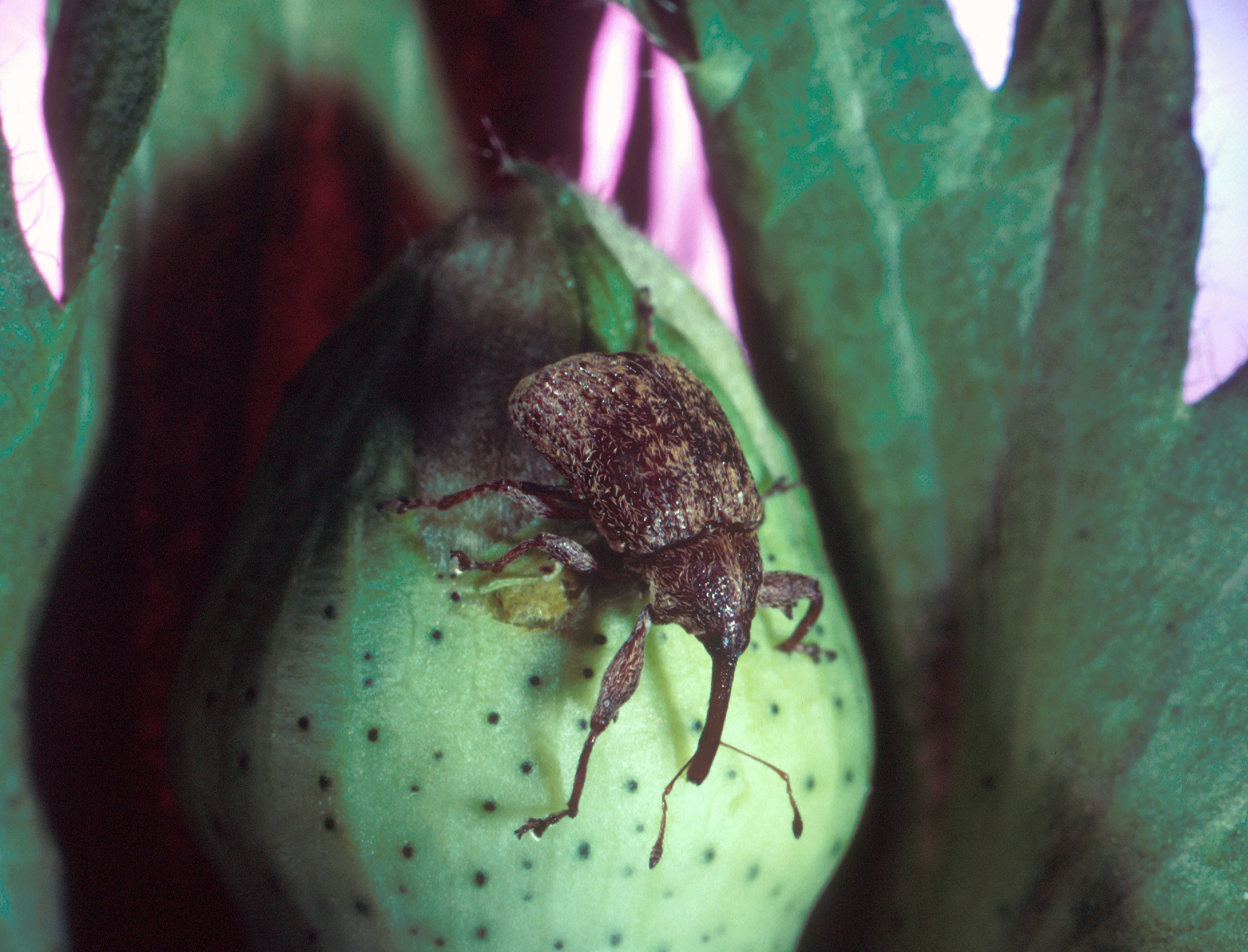
A boll weevil

The farmer said to the merchant

I need some meat and meal.
Get away from here, you son-of-a-gun,
You got boll weevils in your field.

Going to get your home, going to get your home.

— Carl Sandburg's version of "The Boll Weevil Song", 1920

Boll weevils, small, cotton eating insects, entered the United States from Mexico in 1892, created 100 years of problems for the U.S. cotton industry. Many consider the boll weevil almost as important as the Civil War as an agent of change in the South, forcing economic and social changes. In total, the boll weevil is estimated to have caused $22 billion in damages. In the late 1950s, the U.S. cotton industry faced economic problems, and eradication of the boll weevil was prioritized. The Agricultural Research Service built the Boll Weevil Research Laboratory, which came up with detection traps and pheromone lures. The program was successful, and pesticide use reduced significantly while the boll weevil was eradicated in some areas.

=== Africa and India ===
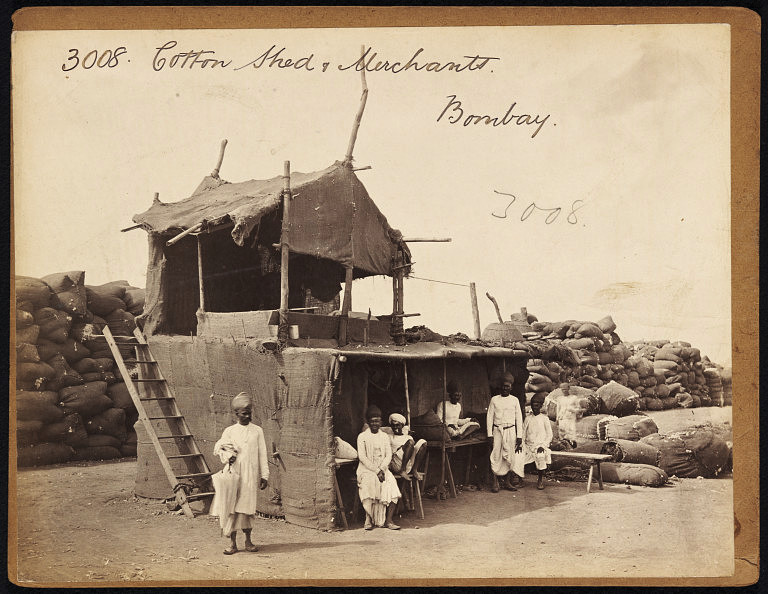
Cotton sheds and merchants in Bombay (1850s-70s) by Francis Frith

After the Cotton Famine, the European textile industry looked to new sources of raw cotton. The African colonies of West Africa and Mozambique provided a cheap supply. Taxes and extra-market means again discouraged local textile production. Working conditions were brutal, especially in the Congo, Angola, and Mozambique. Several revolts occurred, and a cotton black market created a local textile industry. In recent history, United States agricultural subsidies have depressed world prices, making it difficult for African farmers to compete.

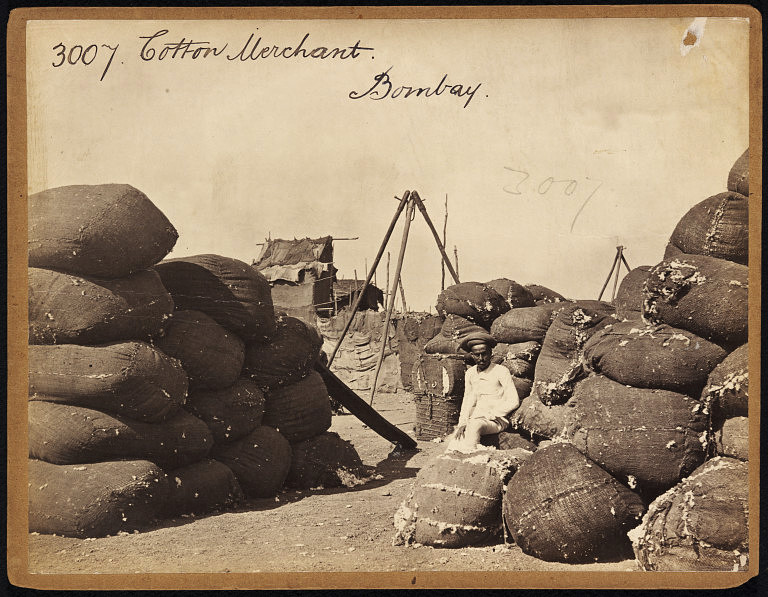
Cotton merchant in Bombay (1850s-70s) by Francis Frith

India's cotton industry struggled in the late 19th century because of unmechanized production and American dominance of raw cotton export. India, ceasing to be a major exporter of cotton goods, became the largest importer of British cotton textiles. Mohandas Gandhi believed that cotton was closely tied to Indian self-determination. In the 1920s he launched the Khadi Movement, a massive boycott of British cotton goods. He urged Indians to use simple homespun cotton textiles, khadi. Cotton became an important symbol in Indian independence. During World War II, shortages created a high demand for khadi, and 16 million yards of cloth were produced in nine months. The British Raj declared khadi subversive; damaging to the British imperial rule. Confiscation, burning of stocks, and jailing of workers resulted, which intensified resistance. In the second half of the 20th century, a downturn in the European cotton industry led to a resurgence of the Indian cotton industry. India began to mechanize and was able to compete in the world market.

=== Decline in the British cotton textile industry ===
British textile mills in 1913

In 1912, the British cotton industry was at its peak, producing eight billion yards of cloth. In World War I, cotton couldn't be exported to foreign markets, and some countries built their own factories, particularly Japan. By 1933 Japan introduced 24-hour cotton production and became the world's largest cotton manufacturer. Demand for British cotton slumped, and during the interwar period 345,000 workers left the industry and 800 mills closed.

India's boycott of British cotton products devastated Lancashire, and in Blackburn 74 mills closed in under four years.

In World War II, the British cotton industry saw an upturn and an increase in workers, with Lancashire mills being tasked with creating parachutes and uniforms for the war.

In the 1950s and '60s, many workers came from the Indian sub-continent and were encouraged to look for work in Lancashire. An increase in the work force allowed mill owners to introduce third (night) shifts. This resurgence in the textile industry did not last long, and by 1958, Britain had become a net importer of cotton cloth.

Modernization of the industry was attempted with the Cotton Industry Act 1959 (7 & 8 Eliz. 2. c. 48).

Mill closures occurred in Lancashire, and it was failing to compete with foreign industry. During the 1960s and '70s, a mill closed in Lancashire almost once a week. By the 1980s, the textile industry of North West Britain had almost disappeared.

=== Economy ===
Textile mills have moved from Western Europe to, more recently, lower-wage areas. Industrial production is currently mostly located in countries like India, Bangladesh, China, and in Latin America. In these regions labour is much less expensive than in the first world, and attracts poor workers. Biotechnology plays an important role in cotton agriculture as genetically modified cotton that can resist Roundup, a herbicide made by the company Monsanto, as well as repel insects. Organically grown cotton is becoming less prevalent in favour of synthetic fibres made from petroleum products.

The demand for cotton has doubled since the 1980s. The main producer of cotton, as of December 2016, is India, at 26%, past China at 20% and the United States at 16%. The leading cotton exporter is the United States, whose production is subsidized by the government, with subsidies estimated at $14 billion between 1995 and 2003. The value of cotton lint has been decreasing for sixty years, and the value of cotton has decreased by 50% in 1997–2007. The global textile and clothing industry employs 23.6 million workers, of which 75% are women.

Max Havelaar, a fair trade association, launched a fair trade label for cotton in 2005, the first for a non-food commodity. Working with small producers from Cameroon, Mali, and Senegal, the fair trade agreement increases substantially the price paid for goods and increases adherence to World Labour Organization conventions. A two-year period in Mali has allowed farmers to buy new agricultural supplies and cattle, and enroll their children in school.

== See also ==
- Diplomacy of the American Civil War#Cotton and the British economy
- History of agriculture
- Christophe Moulherat
