= Pulled wool =

Wool plucked from the dead sheep

The pulled wool is a wool plucked from the dead sheep skin. It is a product of Wool pulling industry. Mazamet was the biggest center of "wool pulling industry" in Europe for Pulled wool also referred to as "skin wool".

== Alternative names ==
Pulled wool has several alternative names such as "slipe wool", "glovers' wool", "tanners' wool" and, "dead wool."

== Wool pulling industry ==
The wool pulling industry deals with the fleece from skin wool or pulled wool. Sheepskin is the raw material for Wool pulling industry. Unlike the usual practice of shearing, the wool of a living sheep, the pulled wool is obtained from the slaughtered sheep raised in the meat industry.

Wool sheared from a live sheep is called "clipped wool" and pulled wool is the wool pulled out from a dead sheepskin. The latter quality is inferior and less desirable. Wool pulling industry has significant role in wool industry. In 1897, there was a monetary incentive in the United States to promote wool pulling locally.

=== Mazamet ===
Mazamet in southern France was the biggest center in Europe for pulled wool. There was a separate department (The Department of Tarn, France) was engaged in this profession with the manpower of 2200 in 1906. The city was used to import sheepskins from many countries for Wool pulling. As per records, a large number of sheepskins were imported into the town in the year, 1910.

==== Process ====
The process includes the following steps such as seating, depilation and fleece removal.

- Loosening the skin
1. The chemical method involves the layering of sodium sulfide on flesh side.
2. Sheepskins is hung in moisten environment.
- Pulling the wool
1. Wool pulling (usually by hand)
2. They call it "slipe wool" if using lime for pulling the wool.
- Sorting

===== Fellmongering =====
Fellmongering is the practice of removing the wool from a dead sheepskin.

=== Use ===
Pulled wool, also known as skin wool, has been often of inferior quality, It was of short staple length, harsher and having less spinnability and was therefore primarily employed in lower to medium-grade woolen products.To make it more useful, pulled wool or skin wool has been blended with other wool qualities.

== See also ==
- Dead cotton: Cotton that has not matured fully or is immature is considered dead cotton. Spinning and dyeing dead cotton is also difficult.
- Sheep meat
