= Yarn realisation =

Operational parameter of spinning

In textile spinning, yarn realisation (YR), or yarn recovery, is an operational parameter of yarn manufacturing. It is the percentage conversion of raw material to finished yarn. The rest of the waste fibers with less value are compared to the weight of the produced yarn from a given weight of raw material. The quantity of waste removed during the various phases of yarn spinning, such as blow-room, carding, and combing, is often used to determine yarn realisation. Yarn realisation ranges between 85% and 90% in carded cotton yarns and between 67% and 75% in combed cotton yarns.

== Significance ==
Yarn realisation is one of the important factors that affect the quality of the yarn, profitability, and lead time of a spinning mill. Better realisations make spinning mills more competitive, and greater realisations mean better economics for a spinning business. Even minor changes in yarn realisation, say 1%, translate into a huge impact on spinning production economics. Thus, controlling yarn realisation is as critical to a mill as controlling cotton and mixing costs.

=== Formula ===
$\mathrm{Yarn\ realisation} = \frac{\mathrm{Yarn\ produced}}{\mathrm{Consumption\ of\ cotton}}\times 100$

== Components ==
The following components play a significant role in yarn realisation:

=== Raw material ===
In the spinning industry, the cost of raw material is directly influenced by: procurement, methods of mixing, yarn realisation (waste standards), and re-use of waste. After picking, the cotton lint in compressed bales is transferred to the yarn spinning mills.

==== Cotton lint ====
Cotton lint refers to the fibrous coat that covers the cotton seeds that is left as a byproduct when cotton is ginned. The lint that is delivered to the spinning mill contains a variety of extraneous materials, including seed pieces, dust, and motes, which are collectively referred to as trash. Yarn realisation (YR) is largely influenced by the trash content of cotton, the intended yarn quality, and the type of machinery used.

===== Trash percentage =====
Trash is non-lint material that is present with cotton lint. It is made up of leaf fragments, bark bits, grass, plastic pieces, sand, and dust. The level of contamination is determined by cultivation, harvesting, and ginning conditions.

===== Short fibers =====
Cotton is a natural plant fiber, and depending upon many conditions, such as geography, seed quality, and cultivation, the length of the fiber varies from lot to lot, as well as different qualities. For an example short fiber content (SFC) by number and by weight influences the productivity and quality of the yarn. Cotton lint with more than 25%SFC(n) is a problem in spinning. Short fibers also known as "noil" extraction improves the yarn quality, consequently affects yarn realisation. Extra noil extraction is required for superior and fine quality yarn, which affects the yarn realization.

===== Moisture =====
Cotton is a hygroscopic fiber, which means it takes in moisture from the environment and also dries quickly if it is kept in a dry place. A small amount of moisture loss in the lint may also contribute to yarn realisation.

====== Humidification ======
To maintain a specified level of moisture in cotton, the relative humidity must be maintained at 65 percent during mixing, winding, and packing. Moisture helps in reducing fluff generation and decreasing in invisible losses.

=== Spinning ===
Spinning is a process in textile manufacturing in which staple fibers are converted into yarn. Optimizing spinning processes and waste management benefits the yarn realisation and the economics of a spinning mill.

==== Preparatory ====
===== Mixing of cotton =====
Cotton fibers vary in terms of staple length and other physical qualities; it is an inherent characteristic. Bale mixing, or bale management is the process of testing, sorting, and then mixing fibers from different bales [also include the bales received from different stations] according to their fiber qualities in order to produce a certain quality yarn at the lowest possible cost.

== Waste management ==
The waste in textiles is classified into two types: production waste, which is the raw material for subsequent steps in spinning production (it is cleaning waste left out short fibers in carding or combing, it is a reusable waste). Post-production waste that is not related to spinning, but does happen at the stages of yarn to fabric [manufacturing and processing]. Waste management in spinning contributes to better yarn realisation.

The two types of waste that contribute to yarn realisation are: one is hard waste, which is not reused, and the second type of waste is reusable waste, also called soft waste, which includes sliver bits, lap bits, roving ends, roller waste, and pneumafil.

=== Recycled yarn ===
Yarn produced from the waste fibers can reduce the losses and contribute to the mill's profitability. There are many areas where waste fibers can be used, such as blending.

== See also ==
- Staple (textiles)
