= Christophe Moulherat =

French scholar, anthropologist and analyst

Christophe Moulherat is a French scholar, anthropologist, scientific analyst. He is a textile expert.

== Academics ==
Christophe Moulherat holds a Doctoral degree in archaeology, prehistory, and anthropology from the Sorbonne University Paris.

== Notable studies and publications ==
- The study of cotton history. First evidence of cotton at Neolithic Mehrgarh, Pakistan: analysis of mineralized fibres from a copper bead.
- In-place molecular preservation of cellulose in 5,000-year-old archaeological textiles.
- He is entitled to archaeology of protohistoric textiles, the example of Gallia Celtica.
- Archéologie des textiles protohistoriques fexemple de la Gaule celtique.
- Anthropomorphy of sweat in reliquary guardians (Fang, Gabon): a CT scan study.
- More Publications.

== See also ==
- Cotton
- Cotton maturity
- History of cotton
