= Fellmonger =

Persons who removes animal hair or deals in hides or skins

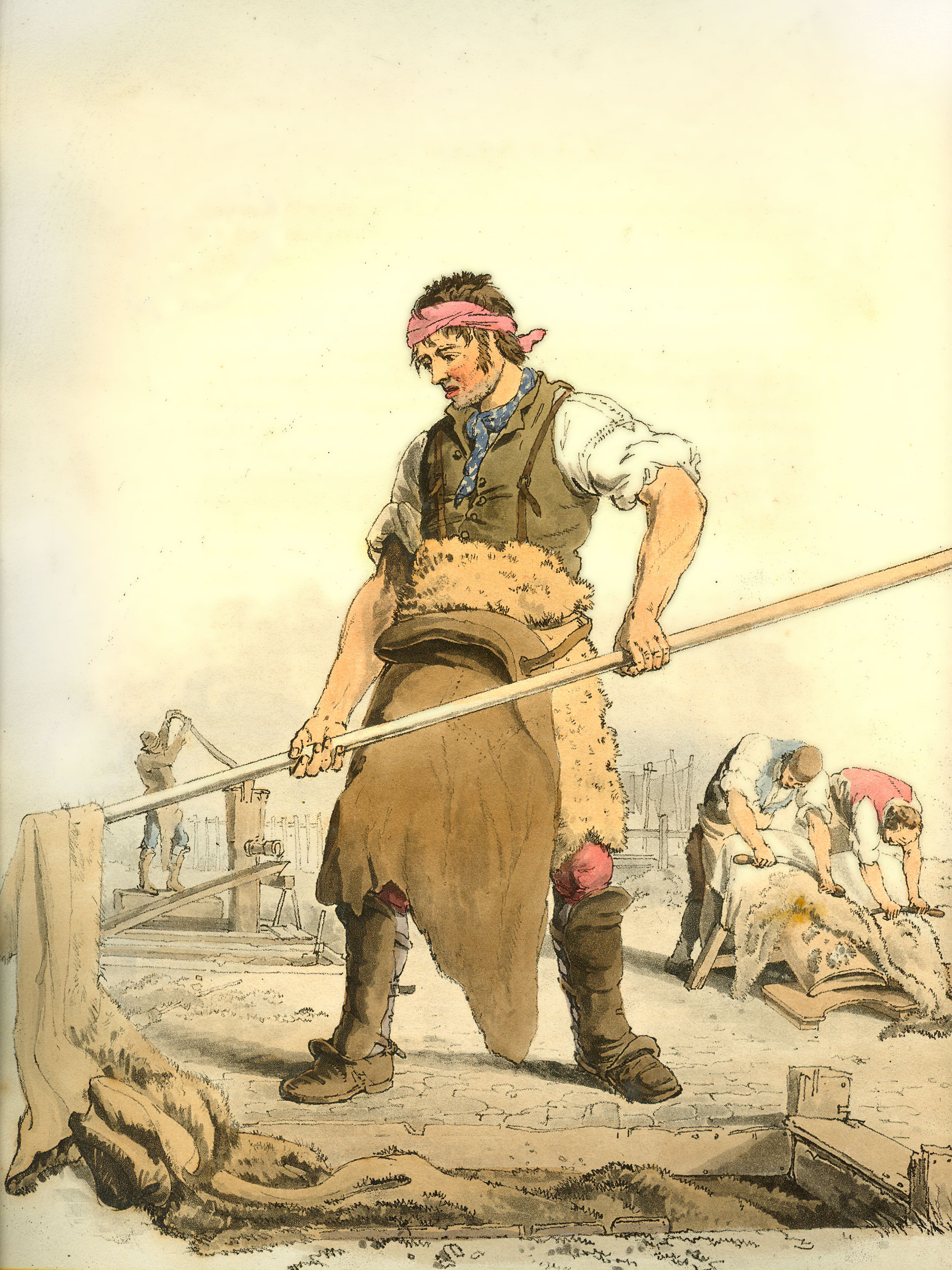
A worker in a fellmonger's yard, 1805

A fellmonger was a dealer in hides or skins, particularly sheepskins, who might also prepare skins for tanning. The name is derived from the Old English ‘fell’ meaning skins and ‘monger’ meaning dealer. Fellmongery is one of the oldest professions in the world and since ancient times, humans have used the skins of animals to clothe themselves, and for making domestic articles.

Historically, fellmongers belonged to a guild or company which had its own rules and by-laws to regulate the quality of the skins, workmanship, treatment of apprentices and trading rights.

== See also ==
- Pulled wool
