= Uster Technologies =

Swiss manufacturer of analytical instruments and on-line monitoring systems

- Company type: Subsidiary
- Industry: Textile Machinery
- Founded: 1875; 151 years ago (earliest roots); 2003; 23 years ago (current company)
- Headquarters: Uster, canton of Zürich, Switzerland
- Area served: Worldwide
- Key people: Davide Maccabruni (CEO)
- Parent: Toyota Industries
- Website: www.uster.com

Uster Technologies, in its industry often called USTER, is a Swiss manufacturer of analytical instruments and on-line monitoring systems for the textile industry, based in Uster, Switzerland. It emerged as a management buy-out form of the textile division Zellweger Uster of the Zellweger Luwa Group in 2003. From 2007 until 2012 the company was publicly traded and listed on the main segment of SIX Swiss Exchange. Since 2012 Uster Technologies is a subsidiary of Toyota Industries.

== Products and services ==
Uster Technologies mainly produces laboratory and on-line systems used to measure and control the quality of fibers, yarns and fabric.

=== For cotton ginning, classing and trading ===
Modern, industrial cotton gins often operate with sensors by Uster, to control their process and to the resulting fiber quality.

Cotton classing is required to measure and classify each cotton bale according to its specific physical attributes. Measurement information produced by Uster's HVI (High Volume Instrument) covers following parameters: fiber length, length uniformity, fiber strength, fiber maturity, short fiber content, micronaire (fiber fineness), color grade, leaf and extraneous matter.

When cotton is traded, its value is determined by the above-mentioned quality parameters, as measured by the HVI in the classing agencies. Hence Uster's HVI has defined a set of standards for a large part of all cotton trades worldwide.

=== For yarn production ===
Uster products are used in the spinning mill for measuring and analyzing the quality of the raw materials (i.e., fibers of different materials), intermediate products (i.e., sliver, roving) and final product (i.e., yarn) along their entire manufacturing process.

Most important process parameters a spinning mill has to control are: quality of the incoming fibers, yarn evenness, hairiness, tensile strength and elongation, contamination with disturbing materials, twist, friction, etc. By measuring these parameters, the instruments can be used as tools for a mill-wide quality assurance process.

An overview of Uster products applied in the spinning mills:

- The "Uster Tester", a laboratory system for the measurement of evenness, thick places, thin places, neps, hairiness, diameter, dust, trash, fineness of yarns
- Yarn tensile testers - at conventional (5m/min) and high speeds (400m/min)
- Yarn fineness tester
- Yarn strength tester (Tensorapid)
- Yarn twist tester
- Yarn friction tester
- Single fiber measuring system (AFIS = Advanced Fibre Investigation System)
- Fiber bundle measuring system (HVI)
- Yarn clearer (Uster Quantum), which is mounted in the automatic winding machine, i.e., "on-line"
- Defect classification instrument (Classimat)
- Cotton cleaning system (Vision Shield)

While developing these different testing instruments, often the first of their kind, Uster also had to invent either the measuring method or the suitable measurement parameters. Some examples:

Measurement Object	Parameter	Explanation	Instrument
Cotton fibers	Neps	Number of neps per gram	AFIS
Cotton fibers	Neps	Mean size of neps (μm)	AFIS
Cotton fibers	Immature fibers	Immature fiber content (in %)	AFIS
Yarn	Uster Evenness	Coefficient of yarn mass variation	Uster Tester
Yarn	Imperfections	Thick places, thin places and neps	Uster Tester
Yarn	Uster Hairiness	Total length of protruding fibers per sensor length	Uster Tester
Yarn	Weak places at 400m/min	Strength of one percent of the weakest values	Uster Tensojet

For comparing such quality parameters in the spinning laboratory with those of other spinning mills worldwide, Uster established a number of benchmarks. The first so-called "Uster Statistics" were introduced in 1957 and have been periodically updated to account for the technical and regional changes in the industry. These statistics are an important element in the trading of yarns, as they allow yarns to be objectively specified and referred to a worldwide quality level.

Uster Technologies also runs the Usterizing certification program for spinning mills.

== History ==
- The roots of the company date back to 1875, when an aerial telegraphy workshop was established in Uster, Switzerland.
- 1927, the production of weaving preparatory machines started under the brand Uster
- 1944, the company started research and development for textile electronics, mainly for the Swiss spinning mills
- 1948, the company launched the first ever yarn evenness tester under the name "Zellweger Uster". Being one of the first of its kind, this instrument and its following product generations became well known worldwide, which explains why the company was able to file "Uster" as a registered trademark, while being located in the city of the same name.
- 1957, the company published the first set of quality standards for yarn evenness, called Uster Statistics
- 1989, acquisition of Schaffner Technologies (USA)
- 1990, acquisition of Spinlab (USA)
- 1993, acquisition of Peyer (Switzerland)
- 2003, buyout from Zellweger Luwa by Management and two private-equity investment companies
- 2005, establishment of development and manufacturing site in Suzhou, China
- 2006, secondary buyout by management and funds advised by Alpha Beteiligungsberatung GmbH & Co. KG
- 2007, listing on main segment of SIX Swiss Exchange
- 2008, introduction of new product groups specifically targeting the mid-market segment
- 2009, acquisition of Zweigle products (Germany)
- 2012, public takeover by Toyota Industries Corporation
- 2013, acquisition of Jossi Systems
- 2018, acquisition of Elbit Vision Systems (EVS)
