= Cotton bale =

Compressed pack of cotton lint

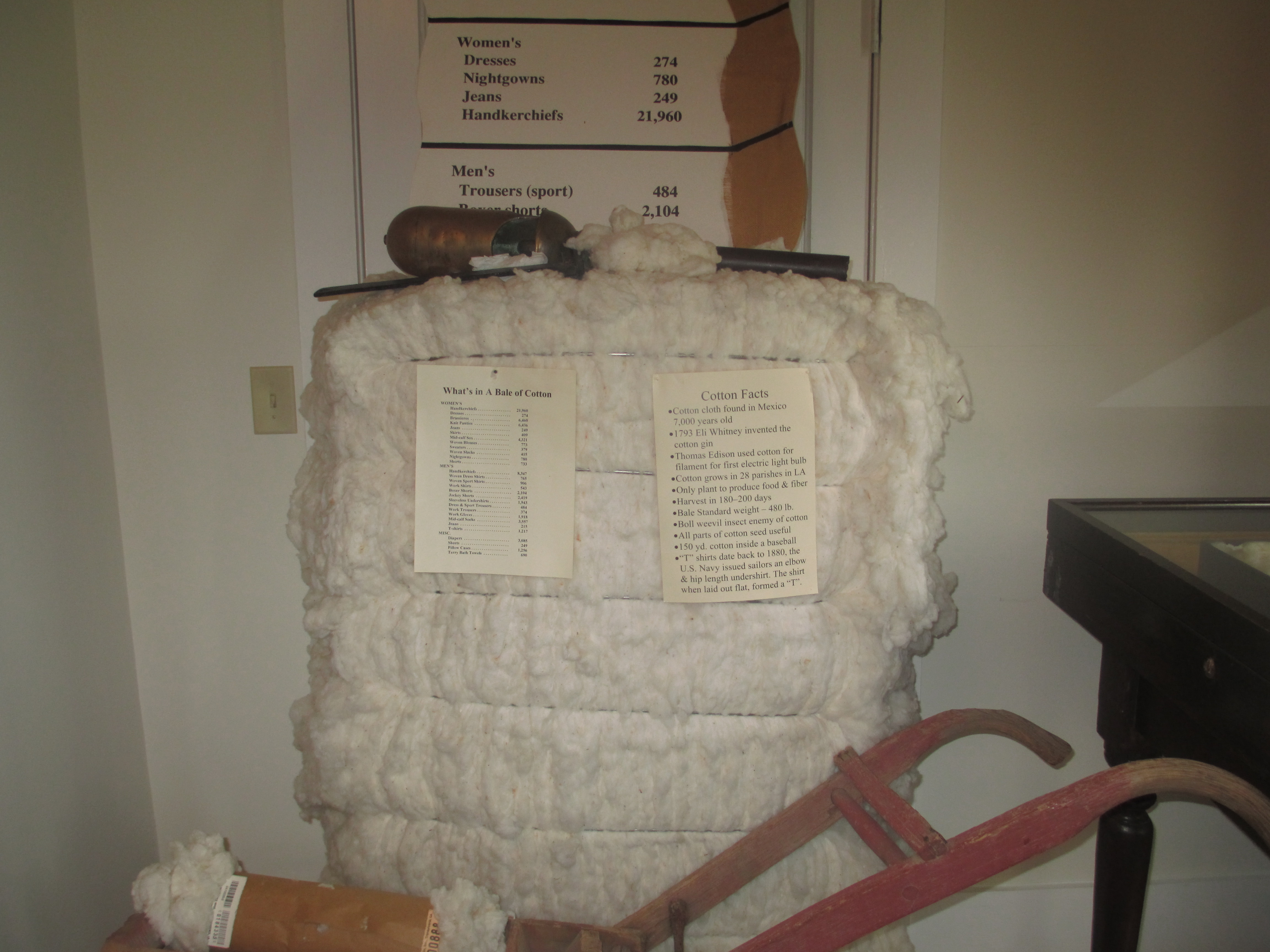
A bale of cotton on display at the Louisiana State Cotton Museum in Lake Providence in East Carroll Parish in northeastern Louisiana

A cotton bale is a standard-sized and weighted pack of compressed cotton lint after ginning. The dimensions and weight may vary with different cotton-producing countries.

== Significance ==
A bale has an essential role from the farm to the factory. The cotton yield is calculated in terms of the number of bales. Bale is a standard packaging method for cotton to avoid various hassles in handling, packing, and transportation. The bales also protect the lint from foreign contamination and make them readily identifiable.

=== Cotton bale management system ===
Bale management encompasses the systematic procedures of categorizing, blending, and assessing bales based on fiber attributes, with the aim of achieving desired quality yarn production at an optimized cost. Cotton fibres differ in terms of staple length and other physical characteristics; this is an inherent feature. Bale management, also known as "bale mixing," is the process of analysing, classifying, and then blending fibres from various bales [which also includes the bales received from other stations] according to their fibre properties in order to create yarn of a specific quality at the most affordable price.

== Standards ==
=== Bale ===
A "bale of cotton" is also the standard trading unit for cotton on the wholesale national and international markets. Although different cotton-growing countries have their bale standards, for example, In the United States, cotton is usually measured at approximately 0.48 cubic meters (17 ft^{3}) and weighs 226.8 kilograms (500 pounds). In India, the standard bale size is 170 kg.

==== Parameters ====
The most important parameters of a cotton bale are:

- Density (448 kg/m^{3})
- Measurements of the bales (nominally 1.40 m X 0.53 m X 0.69 m)
- Weight (Varies, but ‘statistical’ bale weighs 480 lb)

Country-wise bale weight
| Sr.No. | Country | Bale in kg |
|---|---|---|
| 1 | Australia | 227 |
| 2 | Colombia | 233 |
| 3 | Egypt | 327 |
| 4 | India | 170 |
| 5 | Pakistan | 170 |
| 6 | Mexico | 230 |
| 7 | Nigeria | 185 |
| 8 | South Africa | 200 |
| 9 | Sudan | 191 |
| 10 | Tanzania | 181 |
| 11 | Uganda | 181 |
| 12 | United States of America | 225 |

Advances in standardization are reducing the variation in weights, sizes, dimensions, and densities of cotton bales.

=== Candy ===
Candy is another trading unit. A candy weighs approximately 2.09 bales (356 kg). In India, ginned cotton is traded in terms of candy also which weighs 356 kg (355.62 kg).

== Trash ==
When cotton is harvested and exposed to ginning, it carries more than 64% cottonseed, 2% waste and 34% fibrous matter (also known as lint). Lower trash percentage in cotton increases the recovery. Cotton bales are not pure cotton; they contain foreign contaminants, residual trash and leaf (and other non lint material) that have a direct impact on the recovery in yarn spinning.

== Gallery ==
=== Cotton cultivation ===
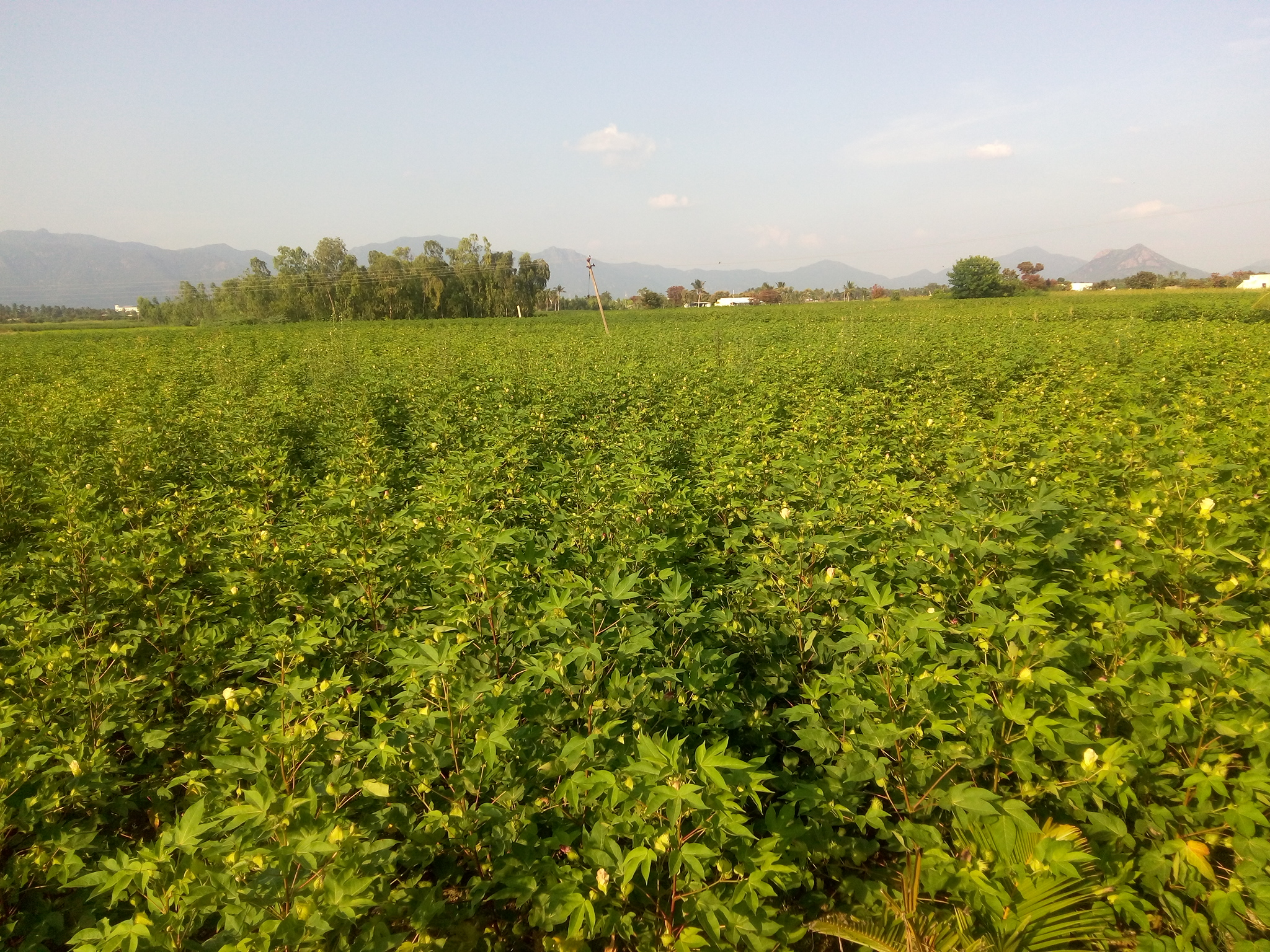
Cotton Field at Singalandapuram, Rasipuram, India (2017)

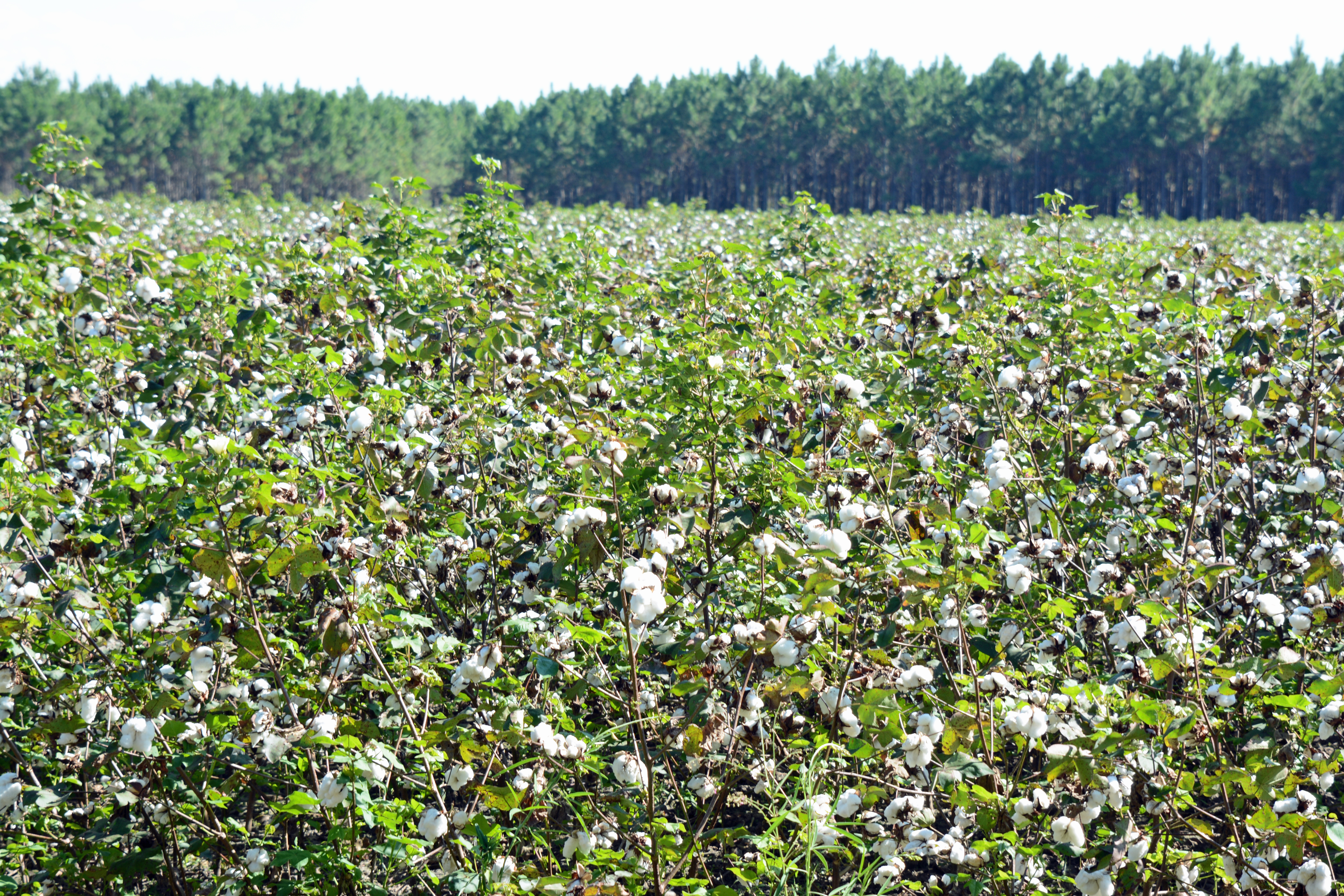
Cotton field

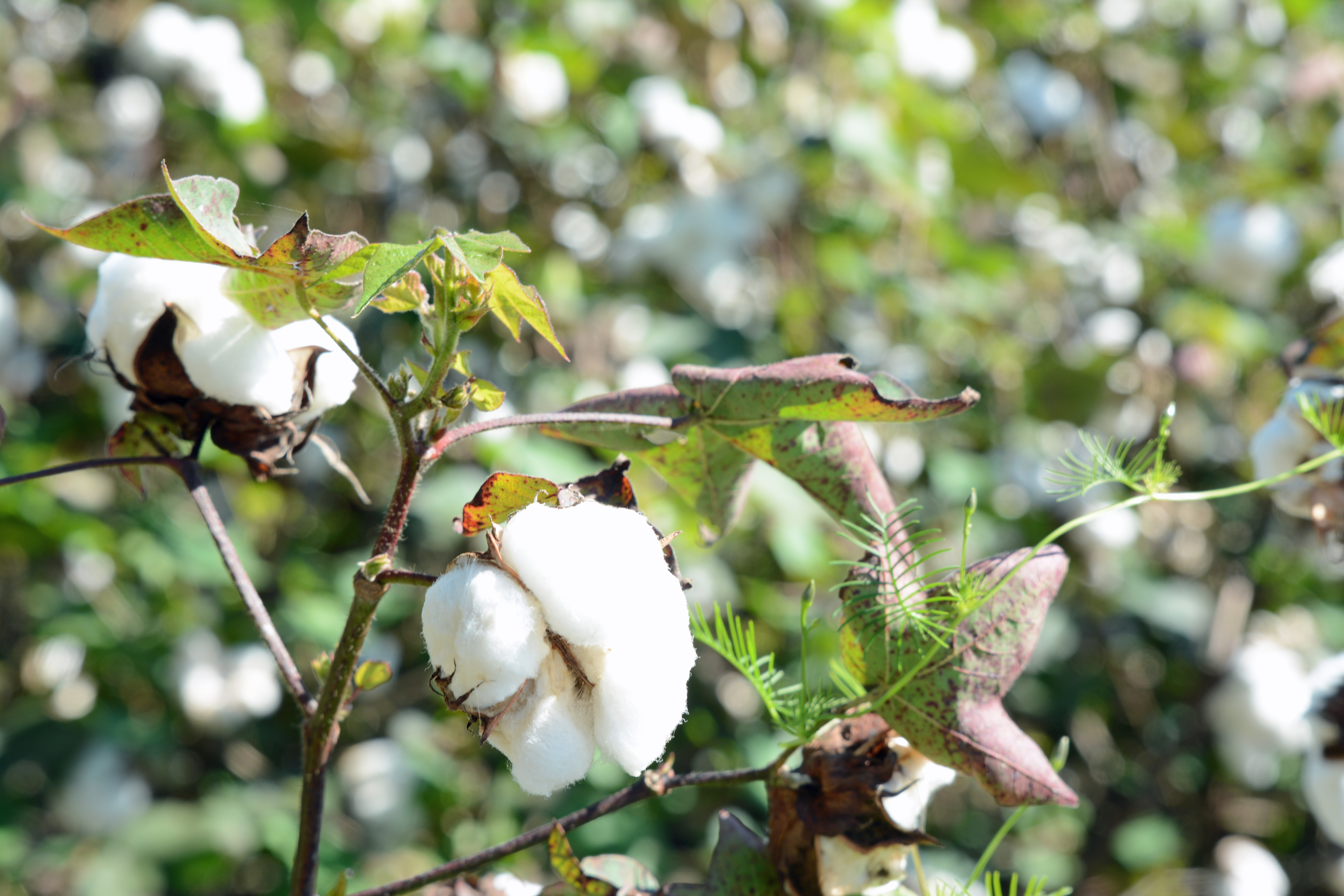
Cotton plant

=== Harvesting ===
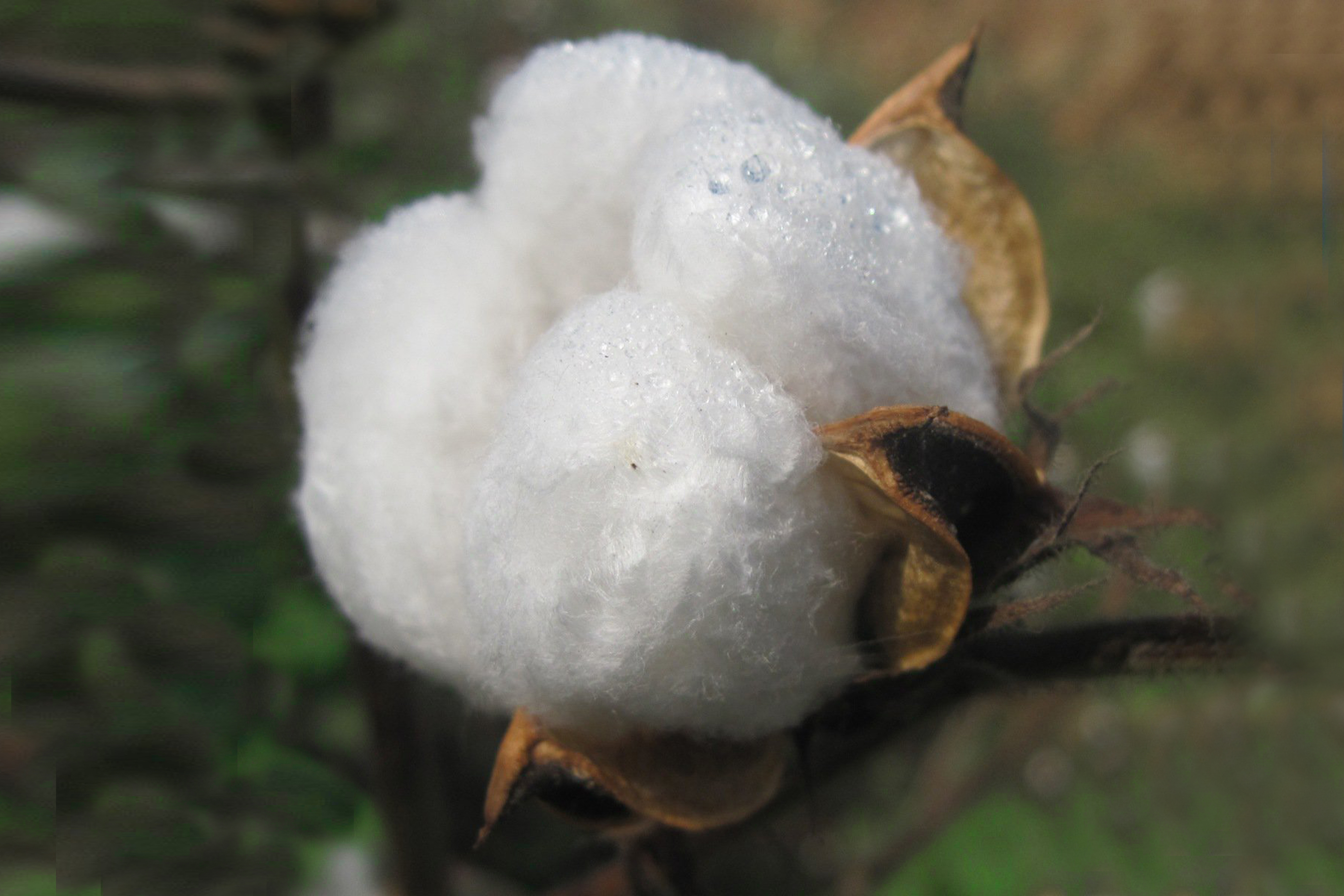
Cotton ready for harvest in Andhra, south India

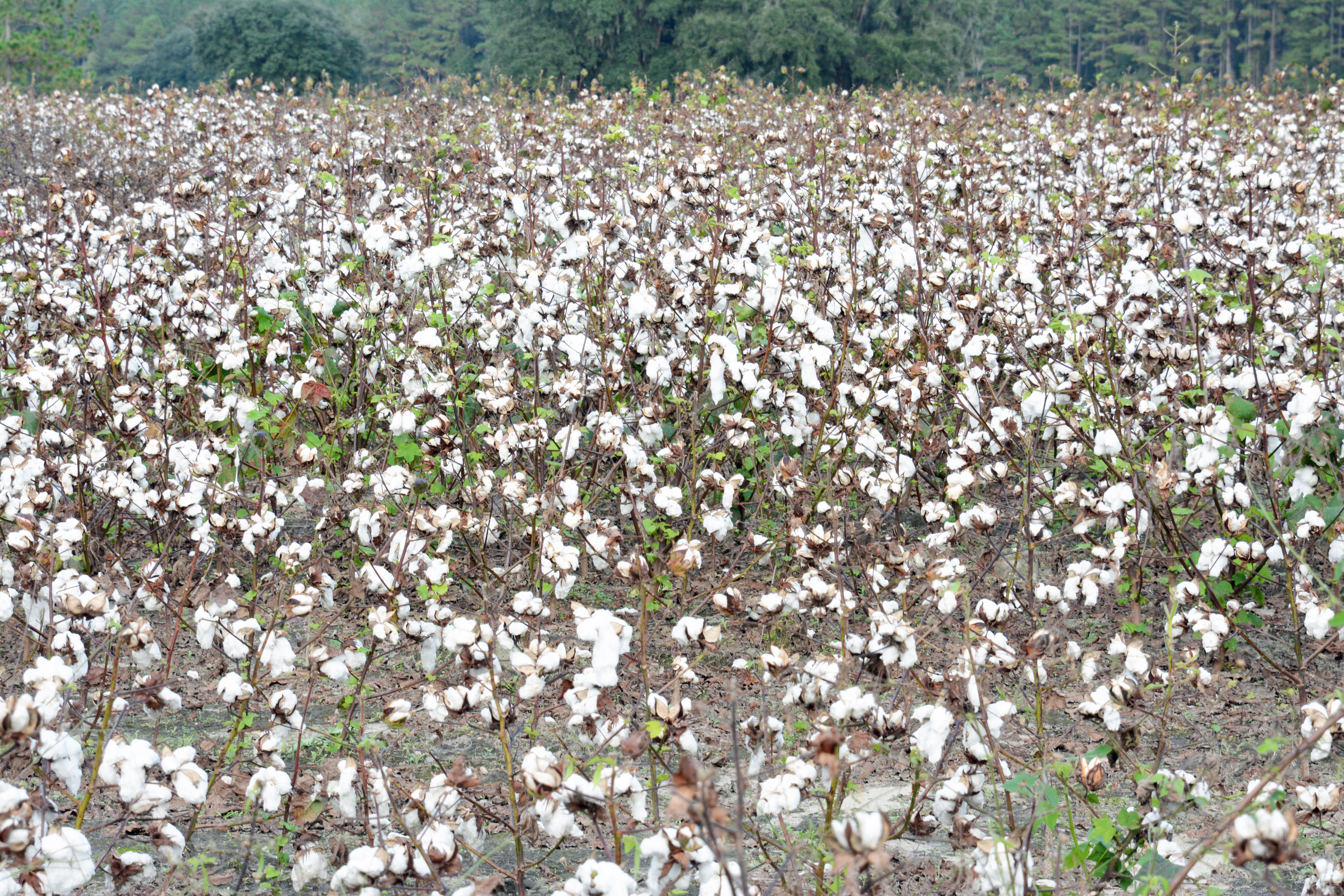
A cotton field, late in the season

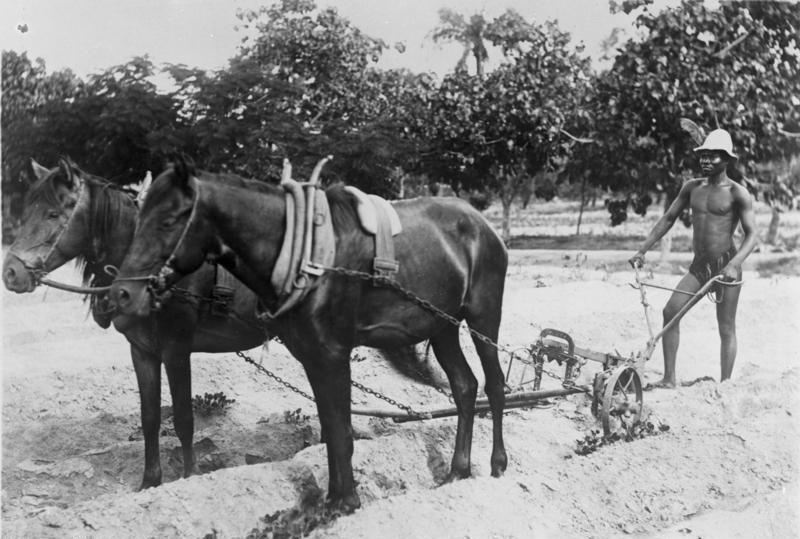
Cotton plowing in Togo, 1928

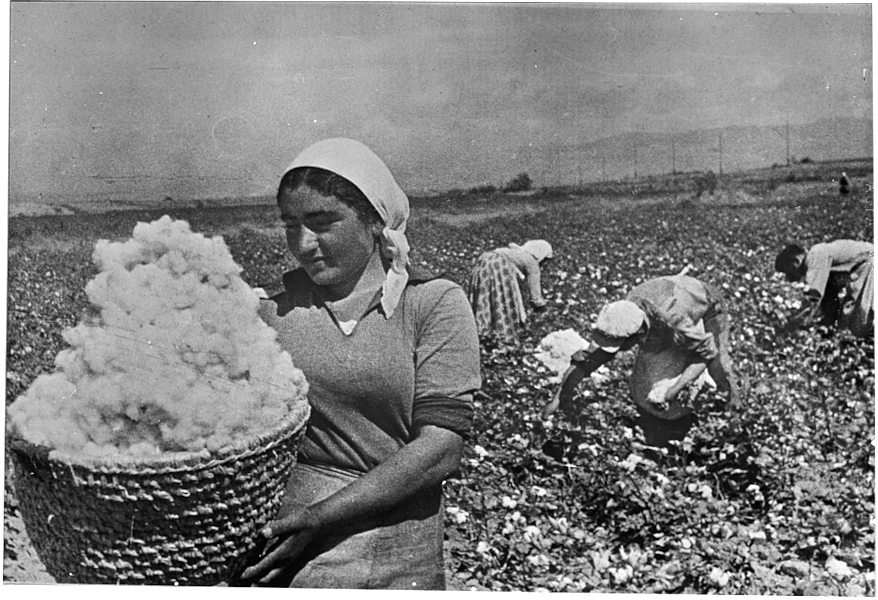
Picking cotton in Armenia in the 1930s. No cotton is grown there today.

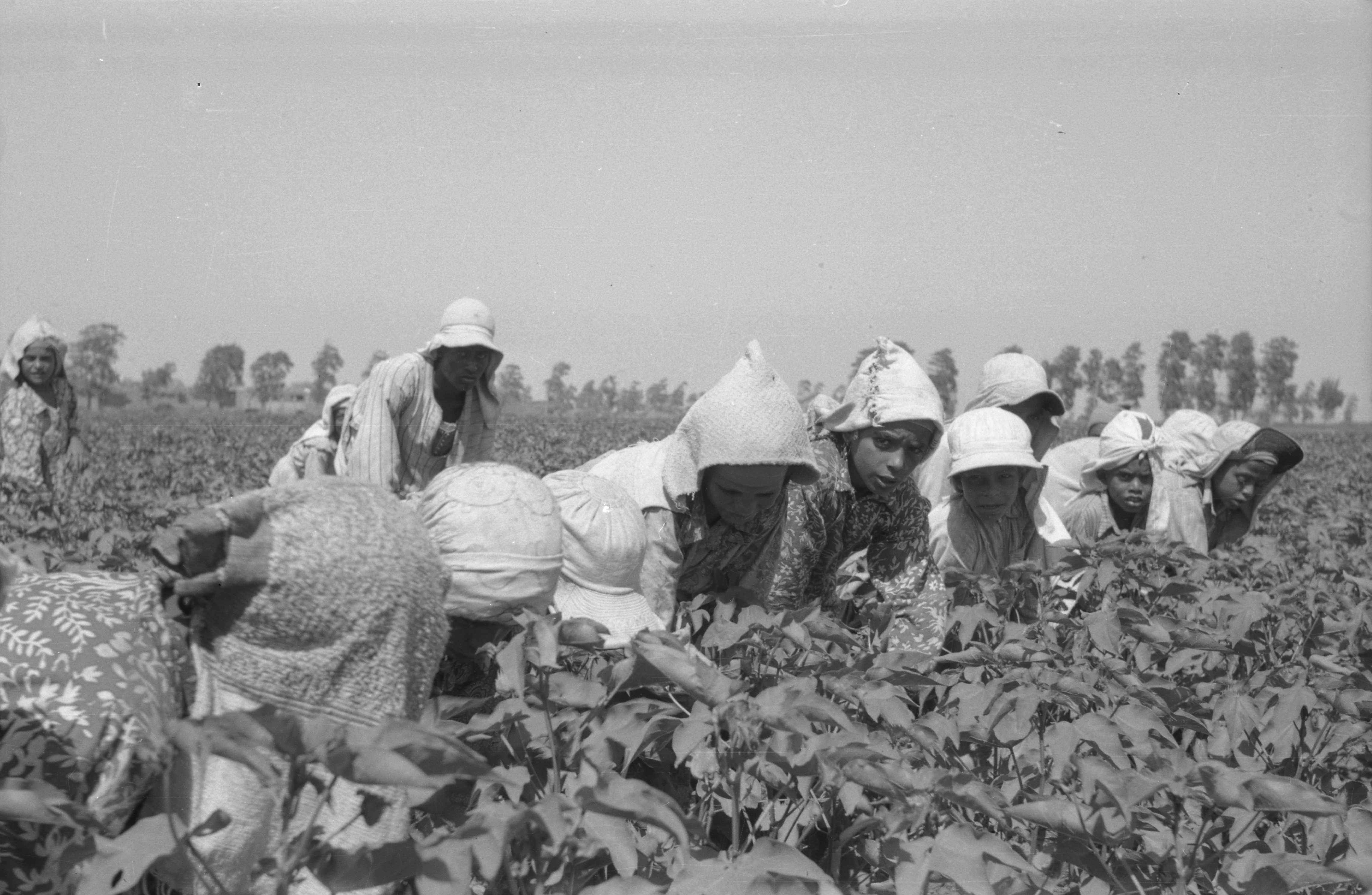
A group of Egyptian fellahs picking cotton by hand

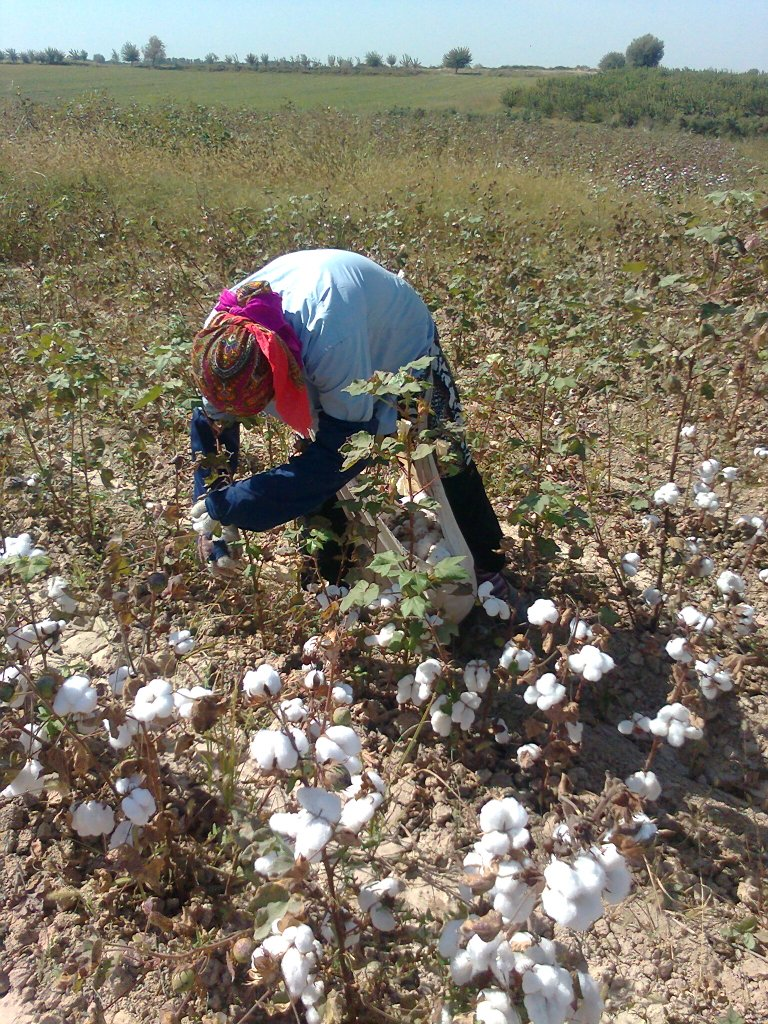
Hand picking cotton (Tashkent, Uzbekistan)

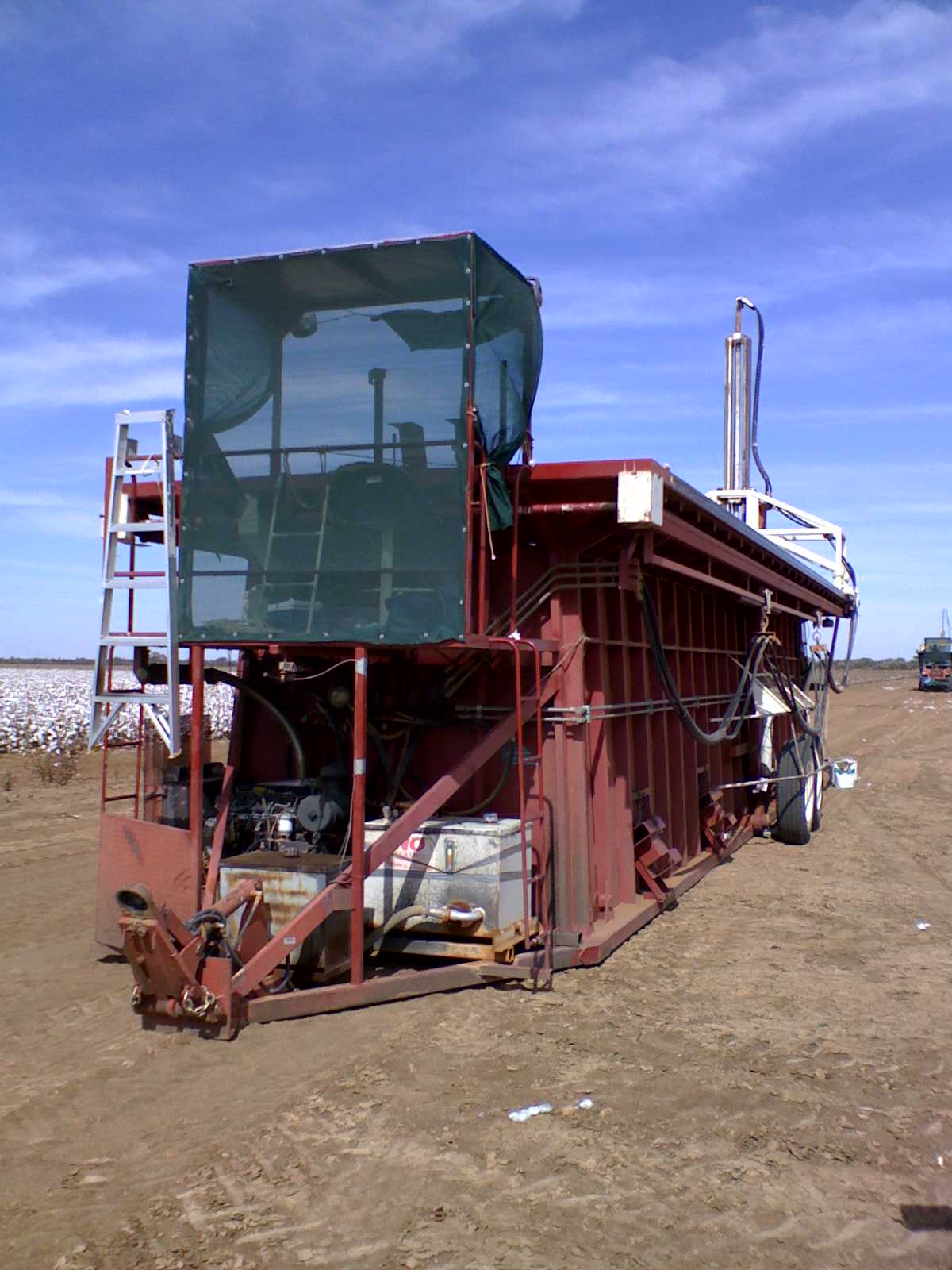
A module builder

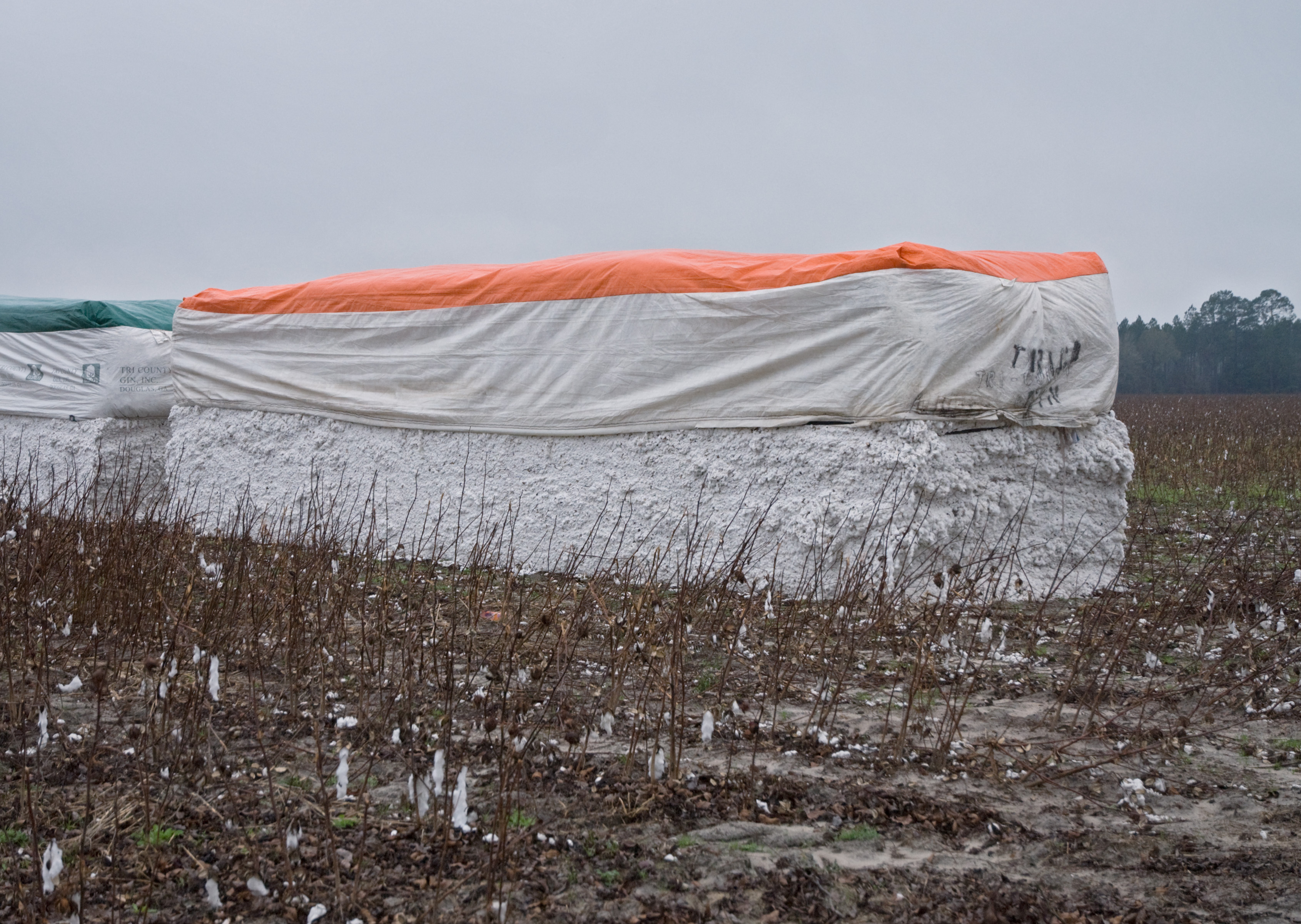
Cotton modules in a harvested cotton field (Clinch County, Georgia, USA, January 2014).

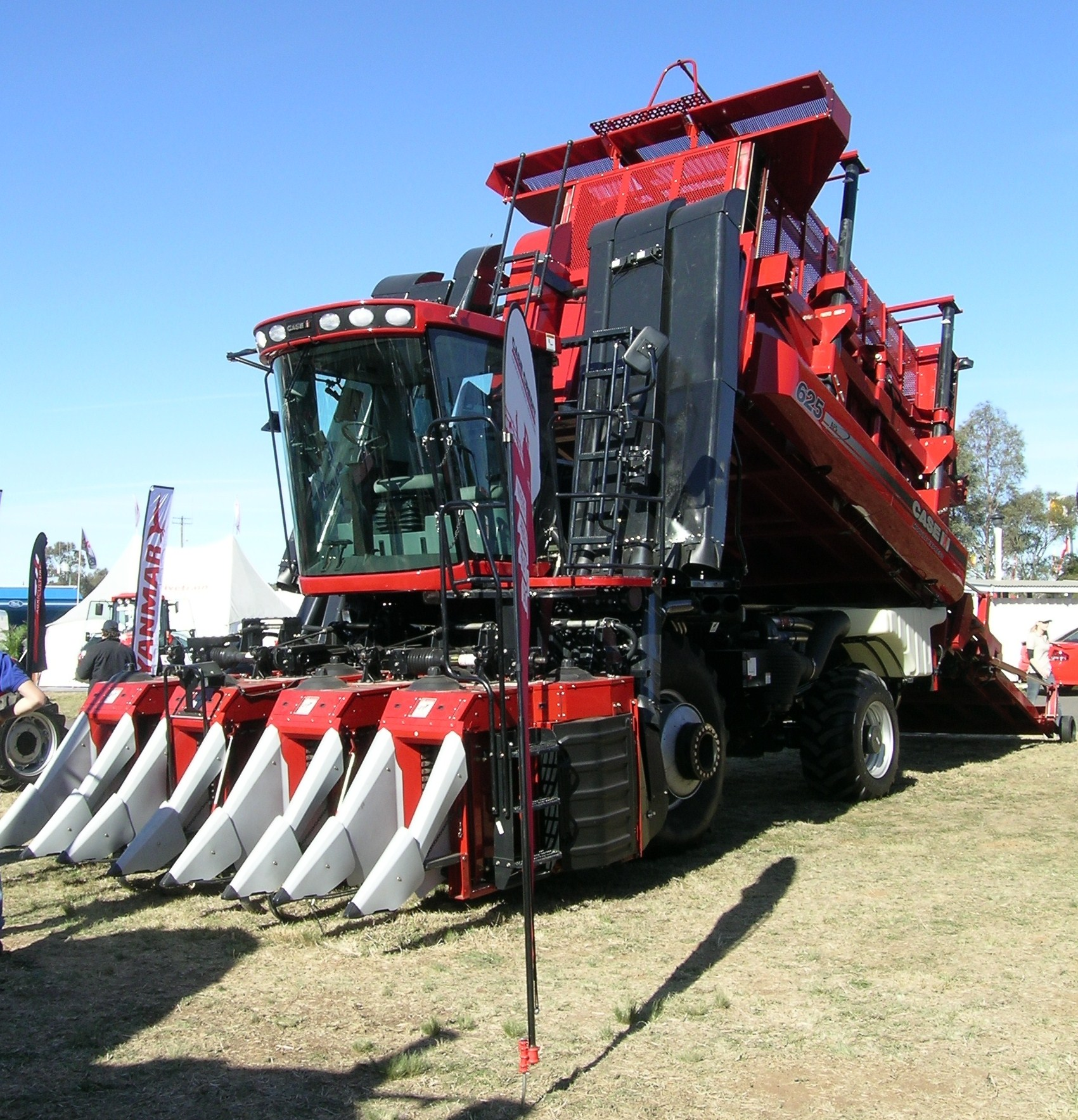
Case IH Module Express 625 picks cotton and simultaneously builds cotton modules

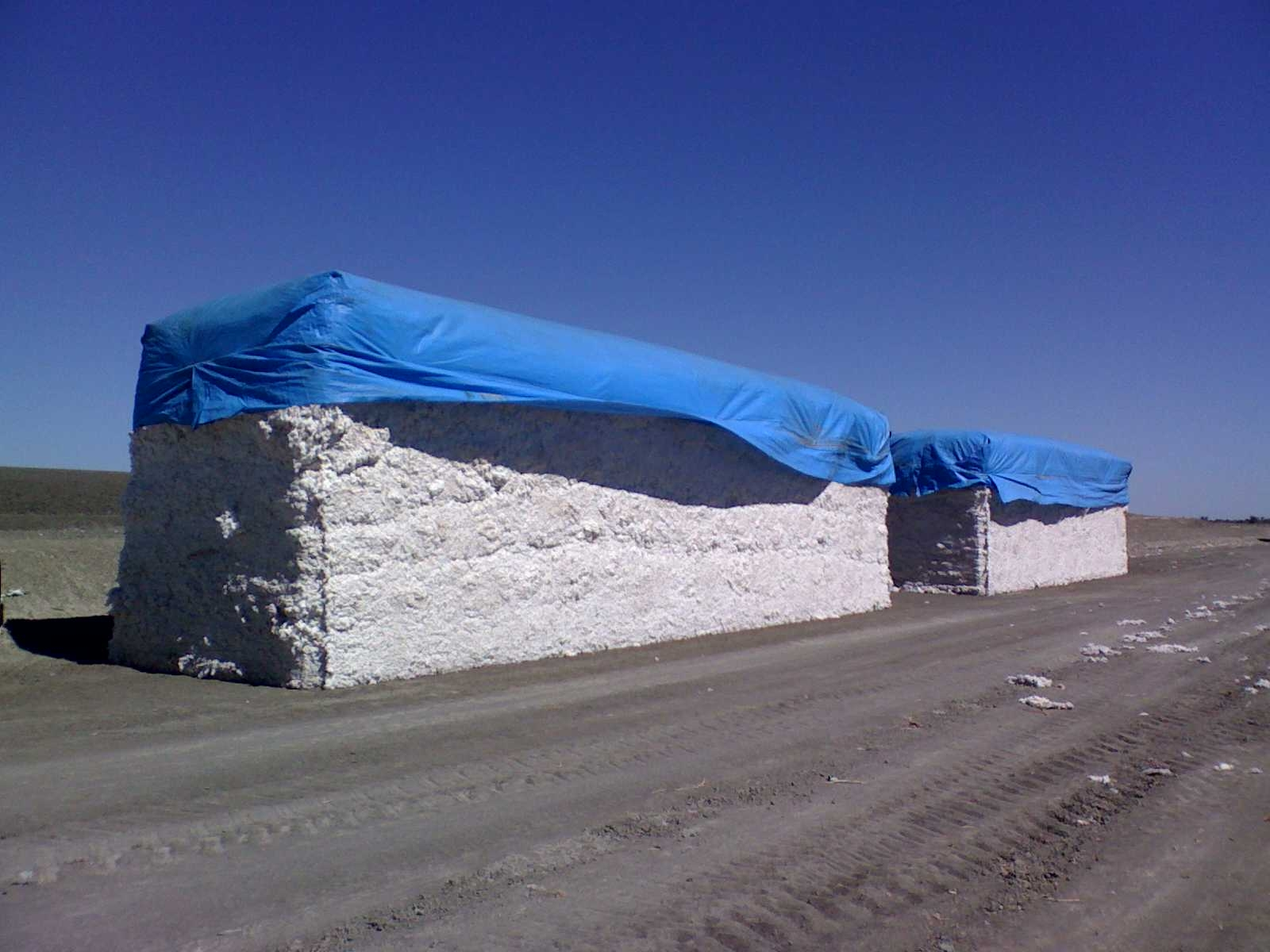
Cotton modules in Australia (2007)

=== Ginning and bale making ===
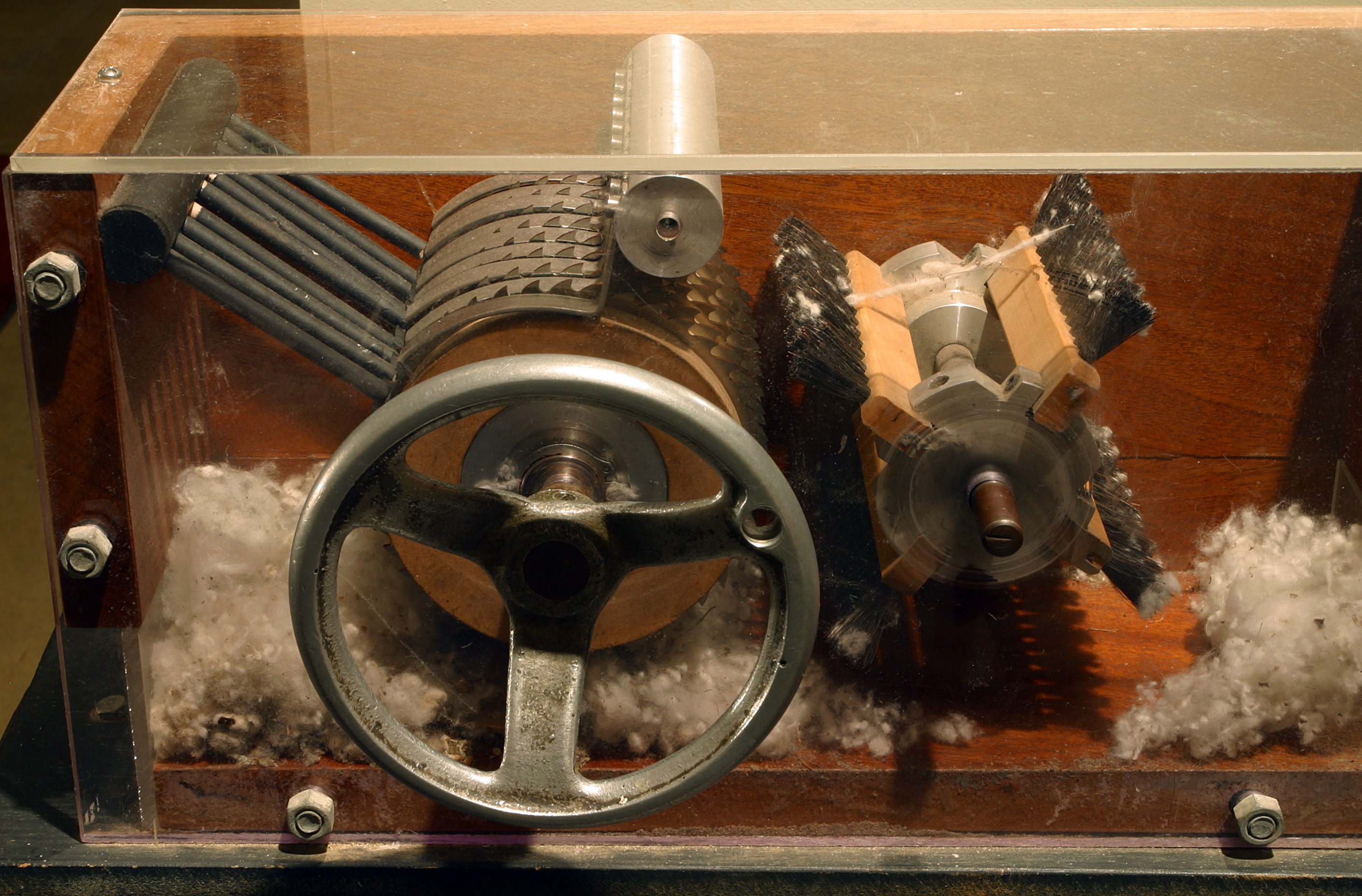
A model of a 19th-century cotton gin on display at the Eli Whitney Museum in Hamden, Connecticut

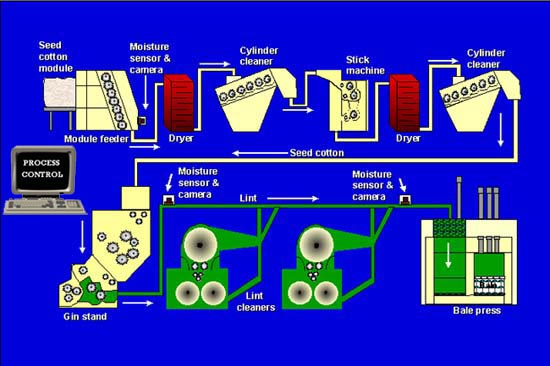
Diagram of a modern cotton gin plant, displaying numerous stages of production

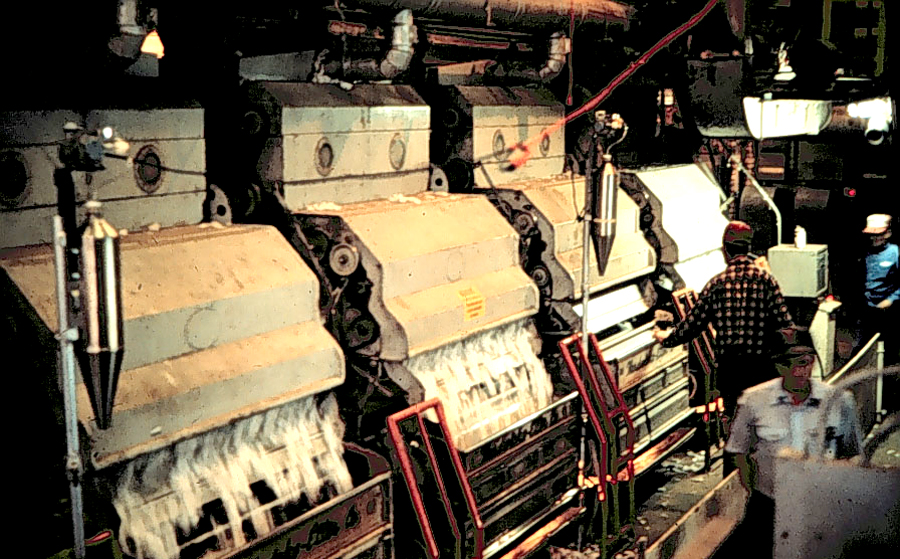
Modern ginning machines in working

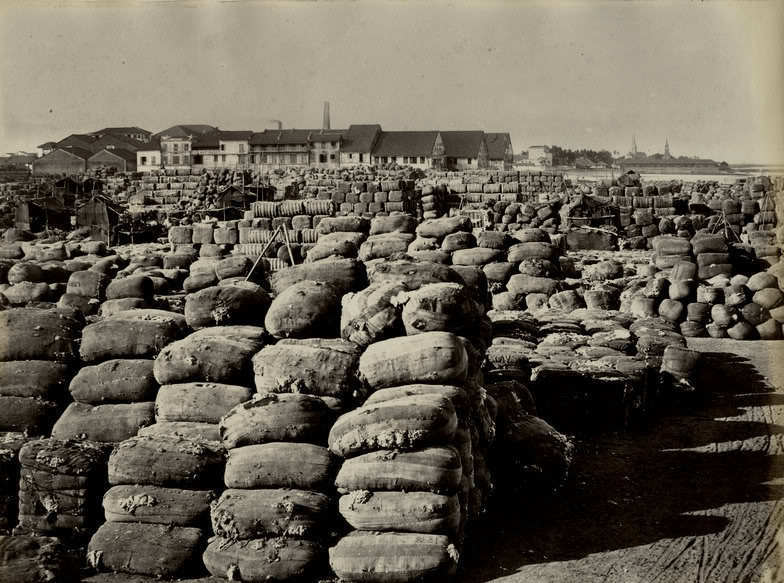
Cotton bales at the port in Bombay, India, 1860's.

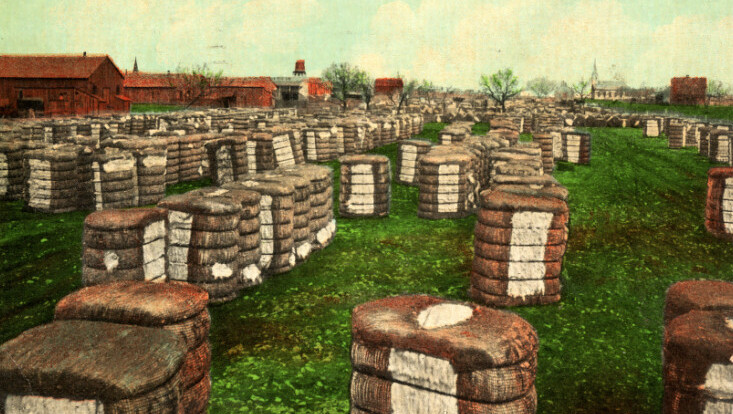
Cotton ready for shipment, Houston, Texas (postcard, 1911)

== See also ==
- Cotton gin
- Cotton
- Spinning (textiles)
- Wool bale
