= Staple (textiles) =

Fibers of discrete length

A staple fiber is a textile fiber of discrete length. The opposite is a filament fiber, which comes in continuous lengths. Staple length is a characteristic fiber length of a sample of staple fibers. It is an essential criterion in yarn spinning and aids in cohesion and twisting. Compared to synthetic fibers, natural fibers tend to have different and shorter lengths. The quality of natural fibers like cotton is categorized by staple length such as short, medium, long staple, and extra-long. Gossypium barbadense, one of several cotton species, produces extra-long staple fibers. The staple fibers may be obtained from natural and synthetic sources. In the case of synthetics and blends, the filament yarns are cut to a predetermined length (staple length).

== Etymology ==
The word staple, used to refer to a fiber of wool, is attested from the 15th century; the use was later broadened to include other fibers such as cotton. The origin of the word is not known for certain. It may be a back-formation either from the obsolete noun stapler meaning wool-stapler, a merchant trading in wool who would sort and class the wool according to quality, or from the obsolete verb staple, to receive goods such as wool at a staple port.

== History ==
For cotton and wool, staple length was originally tested by hand, the tester removing a clump of fiber and then arranging it on a dark cloth for measurement. In the 1970s, machines were invented to perform this task, taking around 5 minutes to measure cotton and around 20 minutes for wool. Today, optical scanning methods such as fibrographs and HVI can be used to measure fiber length as they can measure the staple length more efficiently and precisely.

== Staple length ==
Staple length, a property of staple fiber, is a term referring to the average length of a group of fibers of any composition. Staple length depends on the origin of the fibers. Natural fibers (such as cotton or wool) have a range of lengths in each sample, so the staple length is an average. For synthetic fibers which have been cut to a certain length, the staple length is the same for every fiber in the group.

Staple length is an important criterion for spinning fiber, as shorter fibers are more difficult to spin than longer ones, so staple length varies from short to longer length fibers, short fibers also resulting in more hairy yarns. Long staple fibers or extra-long staple fibers produces soft linens, and superior clothing products. Fine (thin) yarn requires long fibers.

Cotton traders use many systems to classify the quality of cotton fiber. One of the most significant distinctions is "staple length", length of the individual fibers. Traditionally, cultivars of Gossypium barbadense fall into the "long-staple" category. The term extra-long staple (ELS) first came into use in 1907. The International Cotton Advisory Committee, in an attempt to standardize classification, defined extra-long-staple as 1 3/8 inches (35 mm) or longer, and long-staple as 1 1/8 to 1 5/16 inches (29 to 33 mm). Under this classification scheme, most cultivars of G. barbadense produce extra-long-staple fibers, but some cultivars qualify as long-staple.

=== Categorization of staple length ===
Short staple cotton fibers produce carded yarns that are generally irregular and have protruding hairs, hence a cheap yarn quality. Long-staple fibers contribute to better spinnability and strength, delivering regular yarns of superior quality. The staple length of cotton fibers are divided into 19 lengths with a fixed range. The United States Department of Agriculture categorizes the staple length of cotton fibers for convenient cotton classing as follows:

Category	Fiber length
Very Short staple	< 0.25 in (6.4 mm)
Short staple	0.25–0.94 in (6.4–23.9 mm)
Medium staple	0.94–1.13 in (24–29 mm)
Long staple	1.13–1.38 in (29–35 mm)
Extra long staple	> 1.38 in (35 mm)

=== Wool ===
In wool, fineness is the major criterion. Wool classification and grading are focused on measuring the wool's diameter in microns; Merino wool is typically 90–115 mm (3.5–4.5 in) in length and is very fine (between 12 and 24 microns). Longer (more than 3 in or 76 mm) and finer wool yarns are used in fine worsted materials, and coarser and short-staple yarns (1–3 in or 25–76 mm) produce woolen materials. Worsted fabrics are smoother and more expensive.

== Filament fiber ==
Synthetic fibers are produced artificially by humans through chemical synthesis. The process includes polymerization. These fibers are formed with extruding fiber-forming materials through spinnerets. The product is continuous strands. These are called filament yarns. Examples of synthetic fibers are polyester, polyamide, and acrylic. Silk is the only natural fiber obtained as a filament.

If filament fiber is cut into discrete lengths, it becomes staple fiber.

== Core-spun yarn ==
Like blended fabrics, the staple fibers have an important use in core-spun yarn; they are produced by wrapping various staple fibers around a filament yarn. For instance, in a cotton polyester core-spun yarn, cotton wraps around a polyester filament yarn. Similarly, core-spun cotton spandex is a yarn in which cotton fibers are twisted around a spandex yarn and covers the core yarn and are primarily used in denim types. Plying two or more core-spun yarns are used for making core-spun threads.

== See also ==
- Staple (wool)
- Extra-long staple cotton
