= 2020 Maryland's 7th congressional district special election =

Special election held on April 28, 2020

Maryland's 7th congressional district special election
- April 28, 2020

Maryland's 7th congressional district
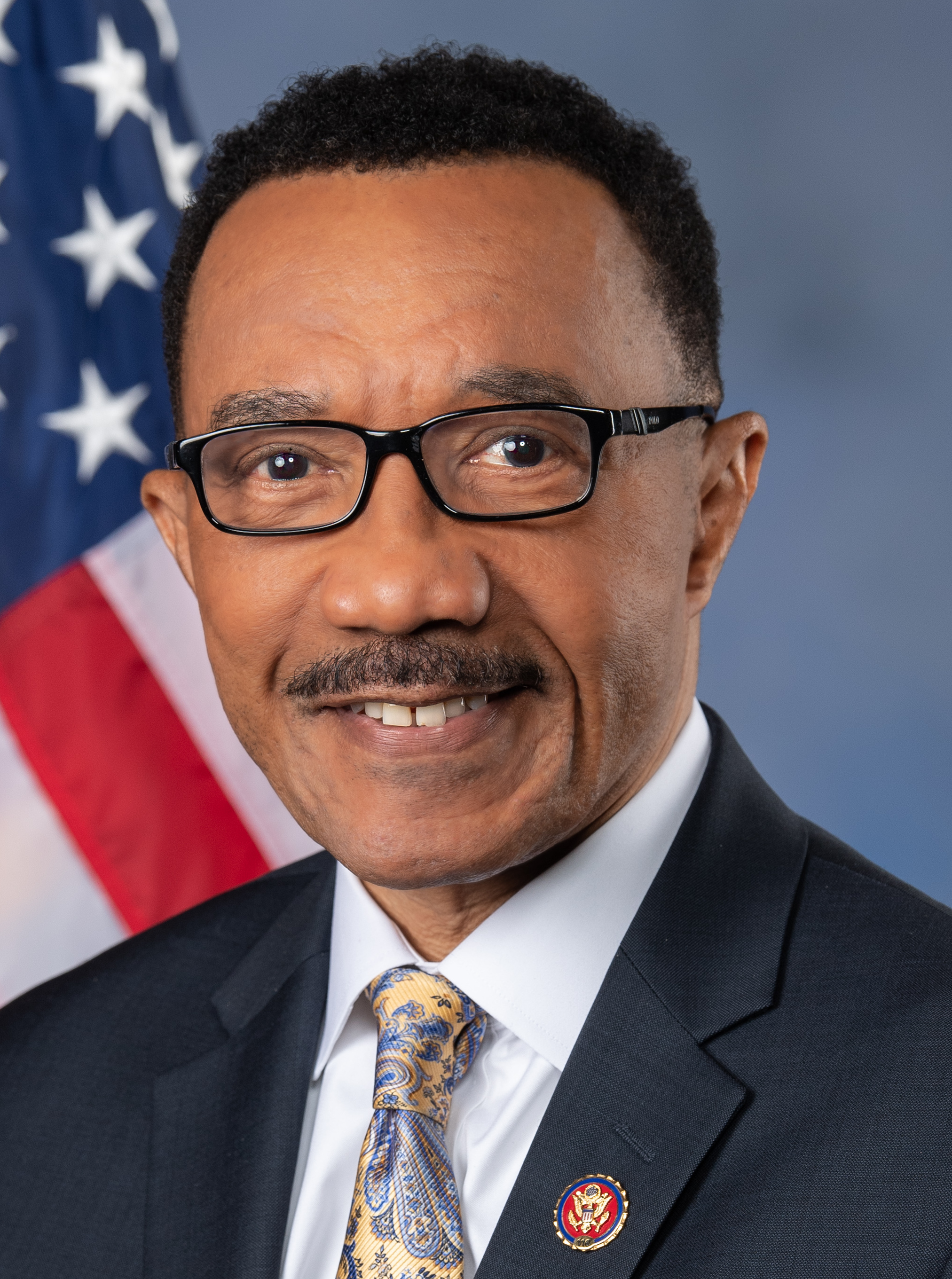

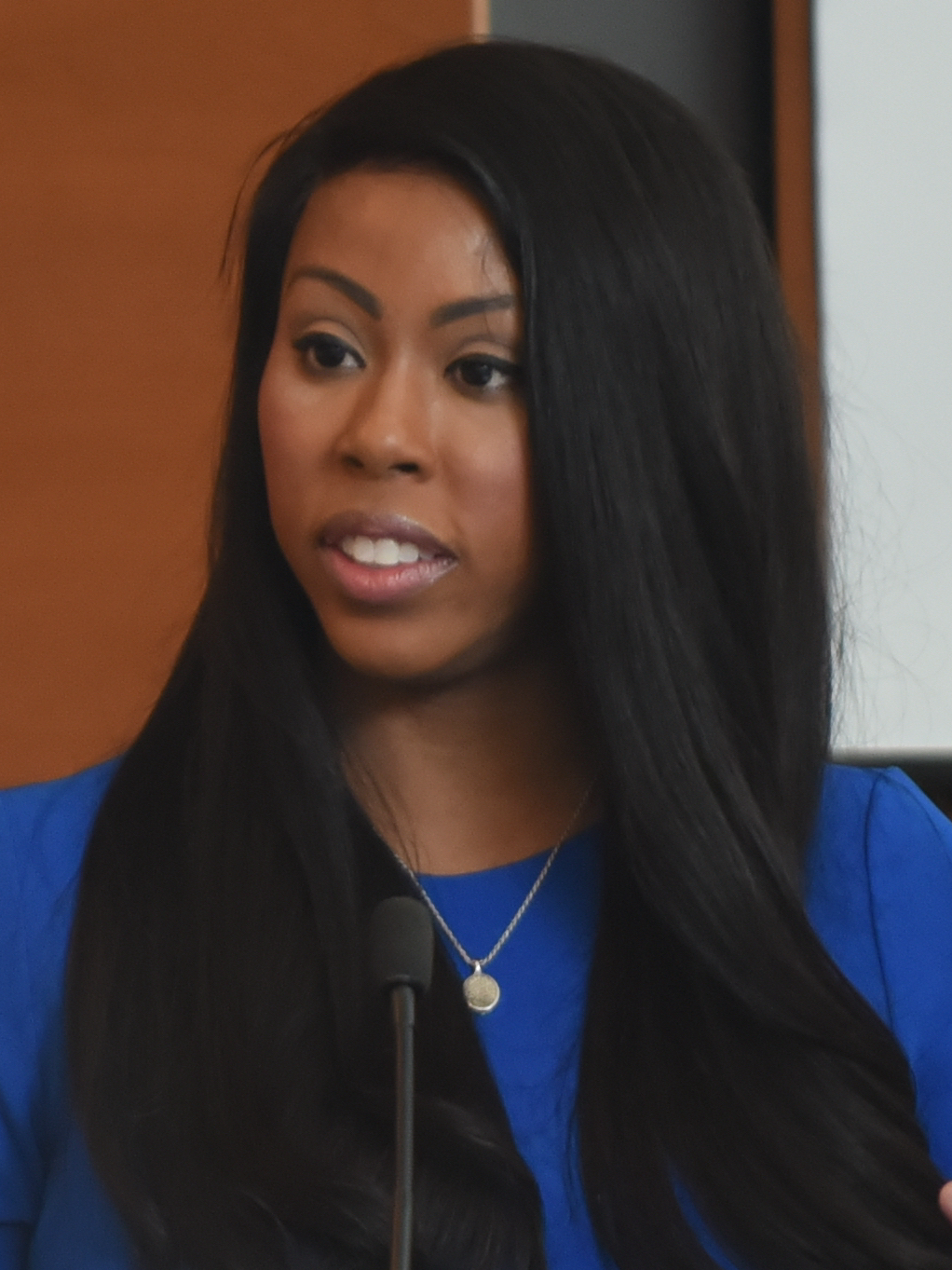
Nominee	Kweisi Mfume	Kimberly Klacik
Party	Democratic	Republican
Popular vote	111,955	38,102
Percentage	73.8%	25.1%
- County results Mfume: 60–70% >90%
U.S. Representative before election
Vacant
Elected U.S. Representative
Kweisi Mfume
Democratic

A special election was held on April 28, 2020, after a February 4, 2020, primary, to fill the remainder of the term in the United States House of Representatives for Maryland's 7th congressional district in the 116th U.S. Congress. Elijah Cummings, the incumbent representative, died in office on October 17, 2019.

On October 28, 2019, Governor Larry Hogan announced the dates for the special primary on February 4, 2020, and the special general election on April 28, 2020, to coincide with the primary voting for the November 2020 general election.

Due to COVID-19 concerns, Hogan announced on March 17, 2020, that the 7th district special general election would be conducted by mail-in ballot only on April 28, while the regular primary election would be postponed to June 2.

On April 13, 2020, the Maryland State Board of Elections decided that three in-person voting centers would be open for the April 28 special general election, one in each local jurisdiction; Baltimore City, Baltimore County and Howard County.

== Democratic primary ==
=== Candidates ===
==== Nominee ====
- Kweisi Mfume, former president and CEO of NAACP and former U.S. Representative for Maryland's 7th congressional district (1987–1996)

==== Defeated in primary ====
- T. Dan Baker, Public Health and Community Development Professional
- Talmadge Branch, state delegate
- Alicia D. Brown
- Anthony Carter Sr., Democratic candidate for Maryland's 7th congressional district in 2018
- Jill P. Carter, state senator
- Matko Lee Chullin III
- Jay Fred Cohen, Howard County Judge of Orphans Court (2006–2010), 2014 candidate for Maryland House of Delegates, District 12
- Nathaniel M. Costley Sr., 2018 Democratic candidate for the Maryland House of Delegates, District 10
- Maya Rockeymoore Cummings, former chairwoman of the Maryland Democratic Party and widow of U.S. Representative Elijah Cummings
- Jermyn Davidson
- Darryl Gonzalez, author
- Mark Gosnell, pulmonologist
- Leslie Grant, former president of the National Dental Association
- Dan L. Hiegel, Democratic candidate for Maryland's 3rd congressional district in 1994 and 1996
- F. Michael Higginbotham, professor, University of Baltimore School of Law
- Terri Hill, state delegate
- Jay Jalisi, state delegate
- Paul V. Konka, teacher, 2018 candidate for Baltimore County school board
- Adrian Petrus, 2018 Democratic candidate for the Maryland State Senate, District 47, Democratic candidate for Maryland's 7th congressional district in 2016
- Saafir Rabb, community activist
- Charles U. Smith, Democratic candidate for Maryland's 7th congressional district in 2018
- Harry Spikes, former Cummings staffer, 2014 Democratic candidate for the Maryland House of Delegates, District 45
- Charles Stokes, Democratic candidate for Maryland's 7th congressional district in 2018

==== Withdrew ====
- Brian Britcher, firefighter (withdrew candidacy on 11/7/19)

==== Declined ====
- Vanessa Atterbeary, state delegate
- Calvin Ball III, Howard County executive
- Antonio Hayes, state senator
- Keith E. Haynes, state delegate
- Ben Jealous, former president and CEO of the NAACP and nominee for Governor of Maryland in 2018 (endorsed Jill Carter)
- Cory V. McCray, state senator
- Stephanie Rawlings-Blake, former mayor of Baltimore and former secretary of the Democratic National Committee
- Charles E. Sydnor III, state delegate

=== Endorsements ===
Saafir Rabb

Individuals

- Keith Ellison, politician and lawyer; 30th Attorney General of Minnesota
- Hasim Rahman, professional boxer, two-time world heavyweight champion
Jill P. Carter

Organizations

- Demand Universal Healthcare
- Our Revolution Maryland

Publications

- The Baltimore Sun
- A Miner Detail

Individuals

- Sanjeev K. Sriram, a.k.a. "Dr. America", physician and Medicare for All activist
Maya Rockeymoore Cummings

Organizations

- EMILY's List
Harry Spikes

Individuals

- Jennifer and Aida Cummings, daughters of late U.S. Representative Elijah Cummings

=== Results ===
Democratic primary results
Party	Candidate	Votes	%
Democratic	Kweisi Mfume	31,415	43.0
Democratic	Maya Rockeymoore Cummings	12,524	17.1
Democratic	Jill P. Carter	11,708	16.0
Democratic	Terri Hill	5,439	7.4
Democratic	F. Michael Higginbotham	3,245	4.4
Democratic	Harry Spikes	2,572	3.5
Democratic	Saafir Rabb	1,327	1.8
Democratic	Jay Jalisi	1,257	1.7
Democratic	Talmadge Branch	810	1.1
Democratic	Mark Gosnell	579	0.8
Democratic	T. Dan Baker	377	0.5
Democratic	Charles Stokes	297	0.4
Democratic	Paul V. Konka	251	0.3
Democratic	Darryl Gonzalez	245	0.3
Democratic	Alicia D. Brown	180	0.2
Democratic	Leslie Grant	176	0.2
Democratic	Anthony Carter	155	0.2
Democratic	Jay Fred Cohen	150	0.2
Democratic	Matko Lee Chullin	79	0.1
Democratic	Charles U. Smith	75	0.1
Democratic	Adrian Petrus	60	0.1
Democratic	Nathaniel M. Costley Sr.	49	0.1
Democratic	Jermyn Davidson	31	0.0
Democratic	Dan L. Hiegel	31	0.0
Total votes		73,032	100.0

== Republican primary ==
=== Candidates ===
==== Nominee ====
- Kimberly Klacik, community activist, Baltimore County Republican Committeewoman, and non-profit founder

==== Defeated in primary ====
- Christopher M. Anderson, activist
- James C. Arnold
- Ray Bly, Republican candidate for Maryland's 7th congressional district in 2016 and 2018, Republican candidate for Maryland's 2nd congressional district in 2012
- Brian L. Brown
- Reba A. Hawkins, community activist
- Liz Matory, nominee for Maryland's 2nd congressional district in 2018
- William T. Newton, election integrity and community activist, Republican candidate for Maryland's 7th congressional district in 2016 and 2018, and Baltimore County Republican Committeeman

=== Results ===
Republican primary results
Party	Candidate	Votes	%
Republican	Kimberly Klacik	4,525	40.2
Republican	Liz Matory	2,740	24.3
Republican	James C. Arnold	1,401	12.4
Republican	Reba A. Hawkins	913	8.1
Republican	Christopher M. Anderson	852	7.6
Republican	William T. Newton	414	3.7
Republican	Ray Bly	236	2.1
Republican	Brian L. Brown	185	1.6
Total votes		11,266	100.0

== General election ==
=== Predictions ===
Source	Ranking	As of
The Cook Political Report	Safe D	April 24, 2020
Inside Elections	Safe D	April 23, 2020
Sabato's Crystal Ball	Safe D	April 23, 2020
Politico	Safe D	April 19, 2020

=== Results ===
Maryland's 7th congressional district special election, 2020
Party	Candidate	Votes	%
Democratic	Kweisi Mfume	111,955	73.8%
Republican	Kimberly Klacik	38,102	25.1%
Independent	Peter James (write-in)	1	0.0%
Write-in		1,660	1.1%
Total votes		151,718	100.0%
Democratic hold			

By county

County	Kweisi Mfume Democratic		Kimberly Klacik Republican		Write-ins		Margin		Total votes
County	#	%	#	%	#	%	#	%	Total votes
Baltimore City	51,960	92.99%	3,122	5.59%	793	1.42%	48,838	87.40%	55,875
Baltimore	32,390	64.11%	17,702	35.03%	434	0.86%	14,688	29.07%	50,526
Howard	27,605	60.91%	17,278	38.13%	434	0.96%	10,327	22.79%	45,317
Totals	111,955	73.79%	38,102	25.11%	1,661	1.09%	73,853	48.68%	151,718

== See also ==
- List of special elections to the United States House of Representatives
