= Saafir Rabb =

American activist

Saafir Rabb is a business strategist, community activist and former advisor to Barack Obama, serving on his transition team in relation to public diplomacy. His career has involved promoting social enterprise, as well as working with ex-convicts and other vulnerable people on issues such as addiction recovery and building low income housing. He is also CEO of Interculture, a strategic consulting firm that advises businesses on cultural competency.

== Personal life ==
Rabb was born in Baltimore, Maryland and grew up between Baltimore and Howard County. He is the son of a teacher and a union steelworker. He graduated with a bachelor's degree from the University of Maryland in Government & Politics in 1998. In 2009, he earned an MBA from Johns Hopkins University's Carey Business School. He lives in Howard Park, in Northwest Baltimore, with his wife and three children.

== Non-profit work ==
In a 2020 voter guide from The Baltimore Sun, Rabb said he had helped thousands of people to recover from addiction as the Chief of Operations of I Can't We Can, a local Baltimore recovery program. In a 2009 article, the newspaper described I Can't We Can as a network of halfway houses and clinical services which treat those suffering from drug addiction.

Rabb is also a member of foreign policy group the Pacific Council on International Policy, and a board member of Educate Girls Globally, a charity operating in the developing world. He is a Trustee of Bayan Claremont, a graduate school operating since 2011 at the Claremont School of Theology, which educates American religious leaders.

== Political work ==
Saafir Rabb helped to organize President Barack Obama's first visit to a mosque, which took place in Baltimore, and was a member of Obama's transition team. He was an unsuccessful Democratic primary candidate for Maryland's 7th congressional district in both the April 2020 special election, held following the death of incumbent Elijah Cummings, and the subsequent November 2020 election. His campaign was endorsed by Keith Ellison, the current Attorney General of Minnesota, Dr. Yusef Salaam (a member of the exonerated five in the Central Park jogger case), and Hasim Rahman a two-time world heavyweight champion.

== Views ==
In 2016, Rabb was a strong proponent of the need for government and communities to tackle what he believed to be a rising trend in bigotry and hatred across the United States.

Writing in the Baltimore Jewish Times, Rabb has advocated closer collaboration between Baltimore's Jewish and African American communities. He claimed that violence afflicting black communities, including in Baltimore, and attacks on Jewish communities, come from the same "ideology of hate that has gripped America these past few years." Apart from calling for Jewish and African American communities to find more ways to work together, he also criticized "Racialized policing, mass incarnation, and a lopsided law-enforcement driven approach" which he said "will inevitably aggravate the root causes of violence, leading to much bigger challenges down the line."

In an interview about his political views, he said that a Green New Deal is needed "to address fundamental issues of environmental health, which have gone unaddressed or under addressed by our government." He also called for a reinstatement of "Obama-era protections for our natural resources."

The Baltimore Sun quoted Rabb describing the first impeachment of Donald Trump as "necessary to ensure compliance with the constitution and to preserve democracy." He also told the paper that he opposed 2017 federal tax cuts, which he said have threatened basic federal safety net programs, and called for "tax reforms" designed to ensure that the "richest citizens must pay their fair share." He supported gun control legislation to prevent ordinary citizens purchasing military-grade weapons, but advocated that should not be done in a way which infringes the Constitutional right to bear arms. Rising income inequality across the US should be addressed by the federal government with more resources to support state and local government, he also said, including more support for "homeless and housing assistance programs, food vouchers, education, and employment programs."

According to WBAL-TV, Rabb is in favor of unionizing jobs and increasing access to unions. He believes that federal subsidies are essential to help create local jobs and supports an increase in the minimum wage to $15 an hour as well the establishment of a living wage.

During a 7th Congressional District debate, Rabb endorsed the Democrat candidates Elizabeth Warren and Bernie Sanders as his favorites for the US presidency.
