= James Simpson (writer) =

American author & writer (born 1951/52)

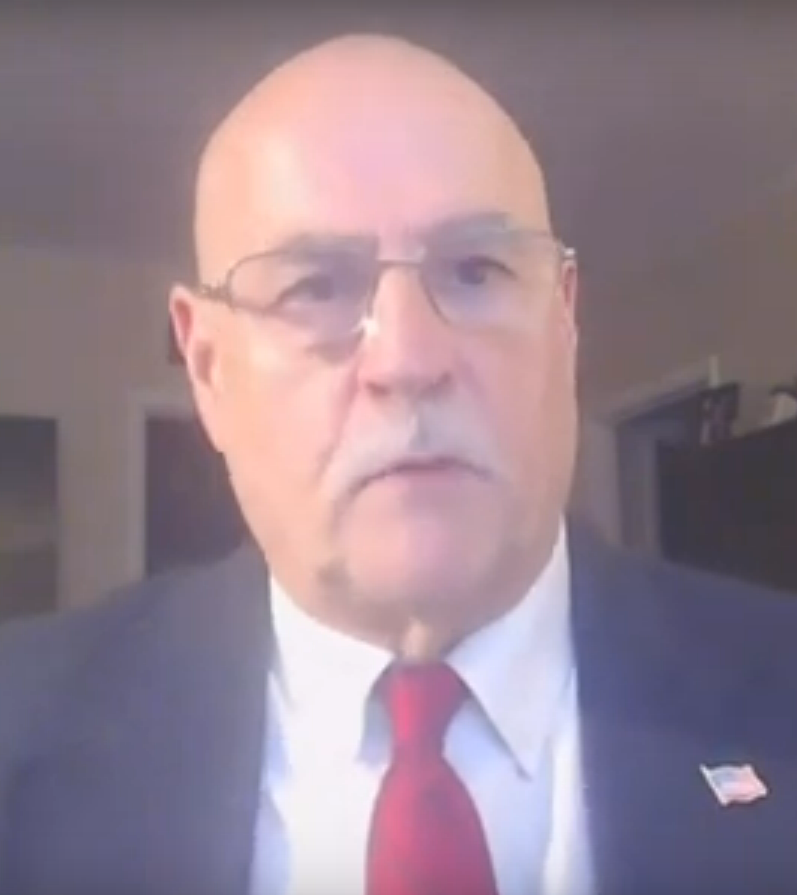
- Simpson in 2024
- Born: 1951 or 1952 (age 73–74); New Haven, Connecticut, U.S.
- Education: University of Delaware (BA, MA)
- Occupations: Author, writer, journalist, economist
- Political party: Republican

James Simpson (born 1951 or 1952) is an American conservative investigative journalist, author, writer, activist and former economist and budget examiner for the White House Office of Management and Budget from 1987 to 1993.

== Biography ==
=== Background ===
Simpson was born in New Haven, Connecticut. He has said that the first historical event he remembers was the assassination of John F. Kennedy, when he was eleven years old. He received a Bachelor of Arts in 1983 following studies at Keystone College and the University of Delaware, and a Master of Arts in economics from the University of Delaware in 1985. He worked for the White House Office of Management and Budget, serving on the Director's personal economics staff and later as a budget analyst under presidents Reagan, H.W. Bush and Clinton. After leaving the OMB in 1993, Simpson started the business Wondermugs, which in 2000 merged with Houze Glass, Inc., where he served as Executive Vice President until 2005.

=== Writings and views ===
Simpson has been described as the "leading proponent" claiming to expose the Cloward–Piven strategy as a vast "malevolent overarching strategy" of the political left in articles published in American Thinker during 2008, which notably influenced Glenn Beck and the Tea Party movement's focus on the theory. Simpson also influenced the Maryland Carroll County Commission to withdraw from the International Council for Local Environmental Initiatives in 2011, and was subsequently signed onto a three-month public relations contract with the commission. In 2015, Simpson wrote the book The Red Green Axis: Refugees, Immigration and the Agenda to Erase America for the Center for Security Policy about refugee resettlement, drawing on the work of Ann Corcoran. He has said that the refugee resettlement program is in need of a "major overhaul", calling for pausing the program, and charged that the "progressive left and Muslim extremists" aim to "undermine and ultimately abolish the U.S. Constitution through Muslim resettlement and immigration." The book was privately recommended by Stephen Miller in one of his emails sent to Breitbart News writer Katie McHugh the same year.

In 2016, Simpson held a speech at an American Freedom Alliance conference, where he said that "the entire multicultural agenda is not an innocent agenda. The goal is to erase Western culture. The goal is to bring in so many different diverse cultures and peoples backgrounds that our unique culture that has given us unprecedented prosperity and peace will be, will just vanish." He was also invited to be the keynote speaker at the Michigan Oakland County Business Roundtable by Oakland County Executive L. Brooks Patterson later the same year. In his speech, he claimed that "hard-left activists holding positions of power in government and business," "are conspiring to bring Muslim fanatics to the United States to destroy our way of life and institute harsh Islamic rule," and alleged that "the Muslim Brotherhood has infiltrated the U.S. government under both Republican and Democratic administrations." He has been accused of promoting conspiracy theories by The Guardian and the Southern Poverty Law Center, and been described as a counter-jihad activist.

Simpson released a follow-up book, titled The Red-Green Axis 2.0: An Existential Threat to America and the World, in 2019. In 2021, he released the book Who Was Karl Marx: The Men, the Motives, and the Menace Behind Today's Rampaging Left, which was endorsed by figures including Wayne Allyn Root, Allen West and Trevor Loudon.

Simpson appeared in Curtis Bowers' documentary films Agenda: Grinding America Down in 2010 and Agenda 2: Masters of Deceit in 2016. He has been active as a blogger, and his writings have been published in The Washington Times, WorldNetDaily, FrontPage Magazine, Accuracy in Media, Breitbart News, Fox Nation among others.

=== Electoral history ===
Simpson ran for the Republican primary in the 2020 Maryland 2nd congressional district election, coming fifth with 15.3% of the vote. He ran again in the 2022 Maryland 11B House of Delegates district election, advancing to the general election where he came in third with 16.8% of the vote.

== Bibliography ==
- The Red-Green Axis: Refugees, Immigration and the Agenda to Erase America. Center for Security Policy Press. 2015. ISBN 978-1515085188.
- The Red-Green Axis 2.0: An Existential Threat to America and the World. Center for Security Policy Press. 2019. ISBN 978-1070931401.
- Who Was Karl Marx?: The Men, the Motives and the Menace Behind Today's Rampaging American Left. Simpson Publishing. 2021. ISBN 979-8513003151.
- Manufactured Crisis: The War to End America. Post Hill. 2024. ISBN 979-8895650509.
