= Kimberly Klacik =

American politician (born 1982)

Kim Klacik
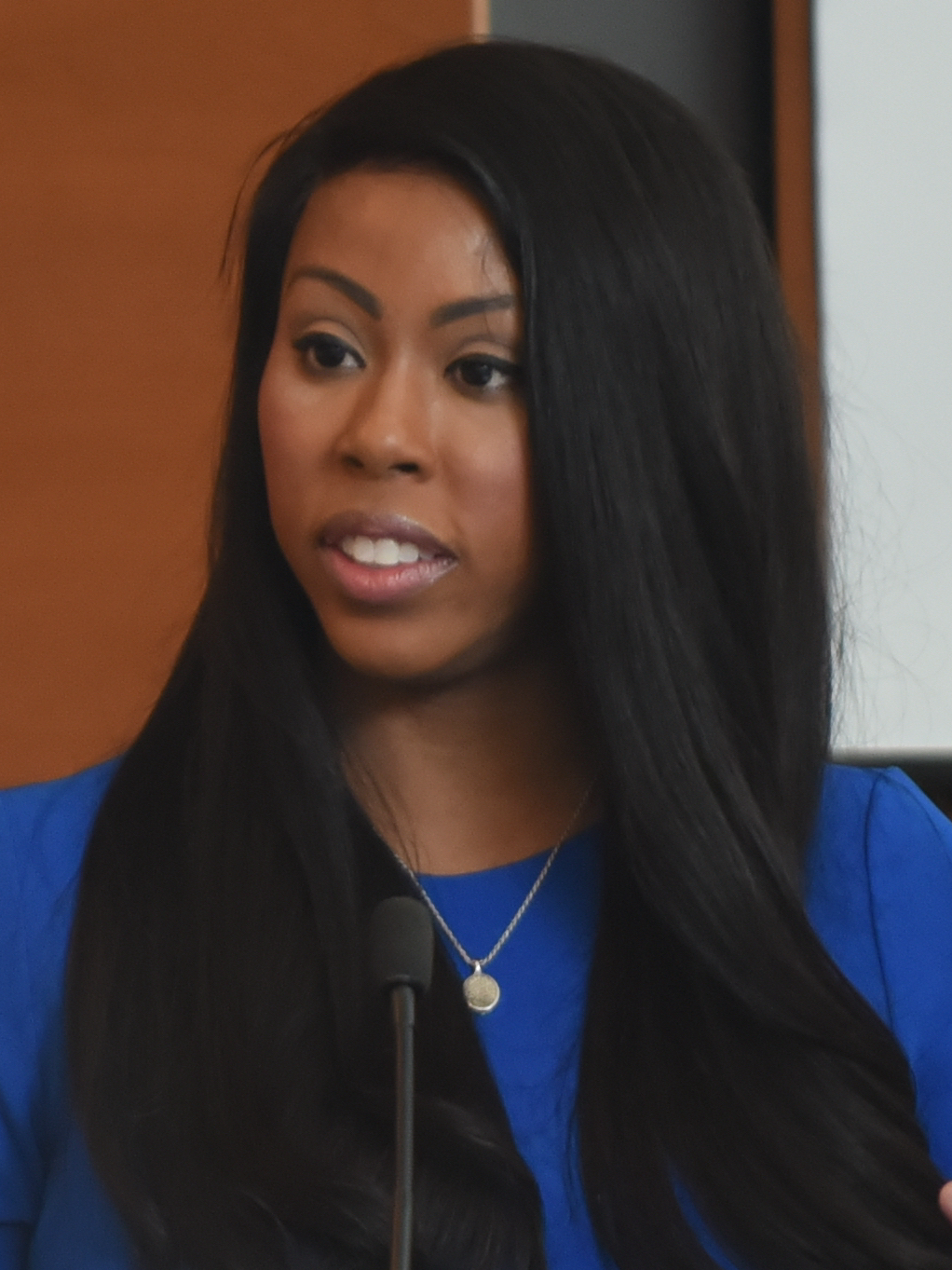
- Klacik in 2020
- Born: Kimberly Nicole Bray; January 19, 1982 (age 44)
- Political party: Republican
- Spouse: Jeffrey Klacik (m. 2013, separated)
- Children: 1

Kimberly Nicole Klacik (née Bray; born January 19, 1982) is an American political commentator. She was the Republican nominee for Maryland's 2nd congressional district in the 2024 general election, in which she was defeated by Baltimore County Executive Johnny Olszewski. She was the Republican nominee for Maryland's 7th congressional district in both the April 2020 special election, held following the death of incumbent Elijah Cummings, and the subsequent November 2020 election. In both 2020 elections, she lost to Democrat Kweisi Mfume by over 40 points.

== Biography ==
Klacik was born Kimberly Bray on January 19, 1982. Klacik grew up in Accokeek, Maryland. She attended Bowie State University, but did not receive a degree. She moved to the Baltimore area in 2010.

In 2013, she founded Potential Me, a nonprofit that assists women with workforce development. Courthouse News reported that Klacik's non-profit filed only one tax return since 2013, reporting a revenue of under $7,000 and expenditures under $3,000 for providing clothing to 10 women rather than the 200 women claimed by Klacik.

In April 2022, Klacik became a full-time midday host at Baltimore's WBAL NewsRadio, Monday-Friday from 10 a.m. to 2 p.m. Klacik had worked part-time for WBAL since June 2021, making regular weekly appearances on afternoon host Torrey Snow's show. She left the station in November 2022.

In May 2023, Talk Radio WCBM 680AM Baltimore announced the addition of Kim Klacik to their morning line up. Klacik began hosting The Kim Klacik Show in the 9am-12 noon time slot.

== Political career ==
Klacik was elected to the Baltimore County Republican Central Committee in 2018. Fox News in 2019 called her a "Republican strategist" and noted her critiques of Congressman Elijah Cummings and the living standards and safety issues in his district.

In a July 2019 interview on Fox & Friends, Klacik talked about Cummings's Baltimore district being overrun by trash and dilapidation. An hour later, President Donald Trump echoed the segment by beginning to disparage both the city of Baltimore and Cummings on Twitter in a series of 19 tweets over two days. Klacik responded to Trump's Twitter comments by tweeting, "This just made my day."

In November 2026, following the 2026 Maryland elections, Klacik told Fox 45 that she was considering running for chair of the Maryland Republican Party.

=== April 2020 7th district special election ===
Klacik ran in the special election for Maryland's 7th Congressional District to replace Cummings, who had died in October 2019. After winning the Republican primary, she faced Kweisi Mfume, a former Democratic holder of the seat. In the general election Klacik received 25.1 percent of the votes, losing to Mfume, who received 73.8 percent.

=== November 2020 7th district election ===
Maryland's 7th District, which included parts of Baltimore County, the majority of Howard County, and more than half of Baltimore City, has been represented by Democrats for decades. No Republican has ever held the seat. Klacik, who did not live in the district, promised to move there if elected. She won the Republican primary on June 2, 2020.

On August 18, 2020, Klacik's campaign released a viral video, titled "Black Lives Don't Matter To Democrats", which was filmed in a dilapidated area of Baltimore. The video shows her asking three residents whether they wanted to defund the police, and they said that they did not. Klacik also criticized the Democratic leaders of Maryland's 7th congressional district, citing Baltimore's alleged notoriety as being among the most dangerous cities in America. The video, posted on Twitter, garnered 4.4 million views its first day, reaching 10 million views by August 22, 2020. Fact-checking website Snopes called the video "misleading". It presented an area of Baltimore, one with a higher poverty rate and more homicides than the 7th District overall, as representative of the district. The video was conceived of and directed and produced by Benny Johnson, chief creative officer of Turning Point USA. According to Snopes, Klacik's campaign had "framed the video as one, long walk through a Baltimore neighborhood" but it was actually filmed from different angles along both sides of a section of Whitelock Street that can be walked in two minutes, and Klacik was shown on a roof of a building at two different points in the video.

President Donald Trump retweeted her ad, stating that "Kimberly will work with the Trump Administration and we will bring Baltimore back, and fast. Don't blow it Baltimore, the Democrats have destroyed your city!" Klacik was one of the speakers on the first day of the 2020 Republican National Convention, where she gave a two-minute speech.

After Klacik accused Mfume in a Twitter post of avoiding debating her, Mfume responded with a post saying that Klacik lacked familiarity with Baltimore, does not live in the city, and that a widely viewed campaign advertisement of Klacik's had misspelled the city's name.

Klacik lost the election with 28 percent of the vote to Mfume's 71.6 percent. She conceded the race to Mfume. On November 8, Klacik claimed that she had won in-person voting and that she had raised enough donations to investigate alleged "irregularities." According to the results published by the State Board of Elections, Mfume received more votes in in-person early and election-day voting as well as in mail-in and provisional voting.

By the end of her 2020 House election campaign, Klacik had raised $8.3 million from small donors, most of them not from Maryland. A 2021 Washington Post article on Klacik's campaign finance filings showed that the campaign paid $4.2 million to two consulting firms. One of them, Arsenal Media Group, who had contracted with Benny Johnson to script and direct the August 2020 campaign video, received over $500,000. The other one, Olympic Media, was paid almost $3.7 million. Klacik's campaign initially reported part of it to the Federal Election Commission as payments to Republican fundraising platform WinRed.

=== 2024 2nd district election ===
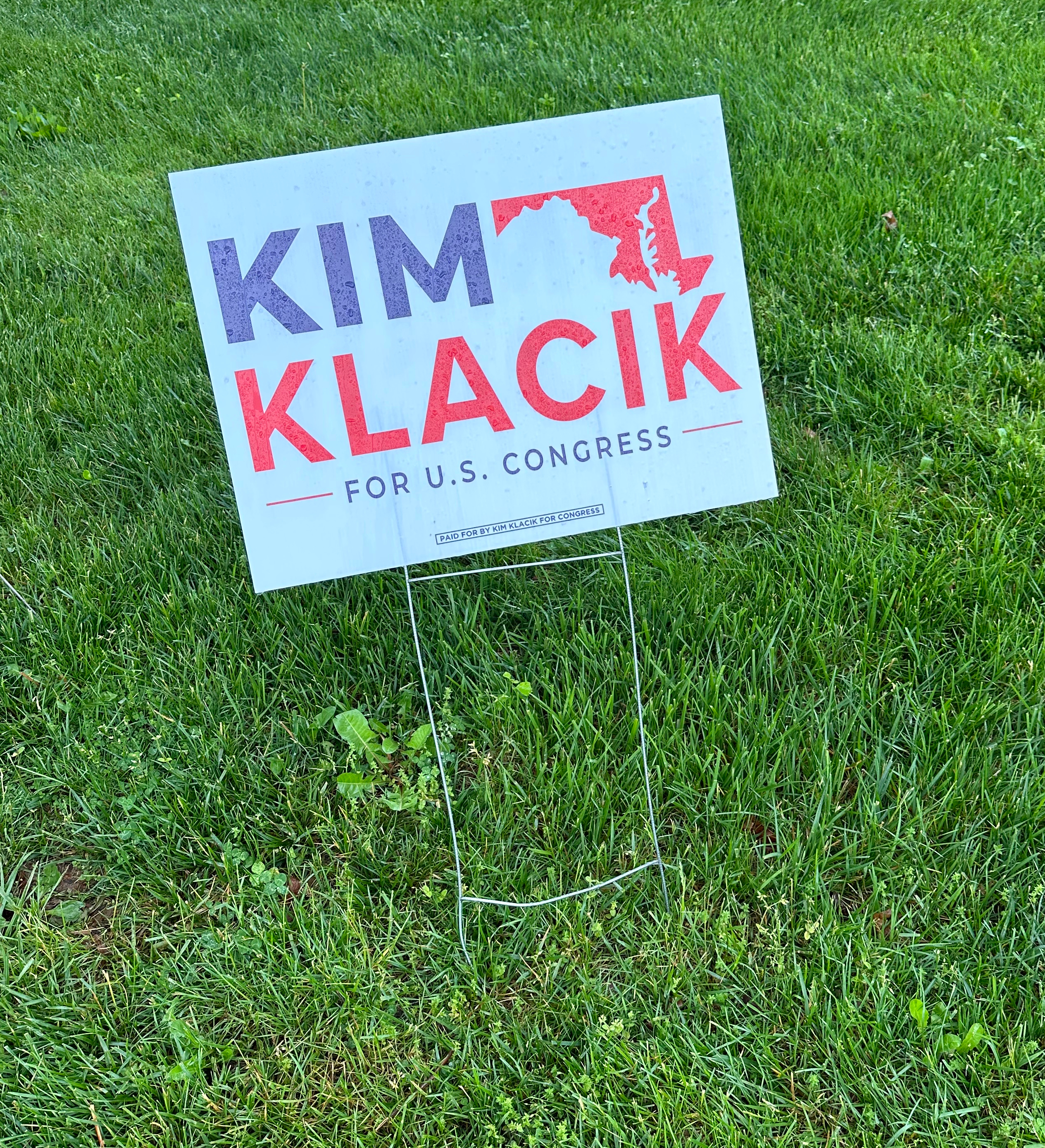
Kimberly Klacik for Congress campaign sign

On February 8, 2024, Klacik announced that she would run for Congress in Maryland's 2nd congressional district, seeking to succeed retiring U.S. Representative Dutch Ruppersberger. During the election, she ran on a platform focused on the issues of crime, immigration, and inflation. Klacik won the Republican primary election on May 14, 2024, and faced Baltimore County Executive Johnny Olszewski in the general election, during which she sought to bring attention to Olszewski's various ethics controversies. Klacik was defeated by Olszewski in the general election.

== Personal life ==
Klacik was married to Jeffrey Klacik. They have a daughter and lived in Middle River, Maryland. They are currently separated.

== Defamation lawsuit against Candace Owens ==
Commentator Candace Owens accused Klacik of being a strip club "madame" who spent campaign funds on cocaine. Klacik responded by filing a $20M defamation lawsuit in August 2021. The suit was dismissed with prejudice in December 2022. Further, Klacik was ordered to pay Owens $115,000 for legal fees.

== Electoral history ==
=== April 2020 special congressional election ===
Republican primary

2020 Maryland's 7th Congressional District special election Republican primary
Party	Candidate	Votes	%
Republican	Kimberly Klacik	4,525	40.2
Republican	Liz Matory	2,740	24.3
Republican	James C. Arnold	1,401	12.4
Republican	Reba A. Hawkins	913	8.1
Republican	Christopher M. Anderson	852	7.6
Republican	William Newton	414	3.7
Republican	Ray Bly	236	2.1
Republican	Brian L. Brown	185	1.6
Total votes		11,266	100

General election

Maryland's 7th Congressional District Special Election Results, 2020
Party	Candidate	Votes	%
Democratic	Kweisi Mfume	111,955	73.8
Republican	Kimberly Klacik	38,102	25.1
Write-In	Multiple candidates	1,661	1.1
Total votes		151,718	100

=== November 2020 congressional election ===
Republican primary

2020 Maryland's 7th Congressional District election Republican primary
Party	Candidate	Votes	%
Republican	Kimberly Klacik	16,465	68.8
Republican	Liz Matory	3,401	14.2
Republican	William Newton	1,271	5.3
Republican	Ray Bly	1,234	5.2
Republican	Brian L. Brown	1,134	4.7
Republican	M.J. Madwolf	442	1.8
Total votes		23,947	100

General election

Maryland's 7th congressional district, 2020
Party	Candidate	Votes	%
Democratic	Kweisi Mfume (incumbent)	237,084	71.6
Republican	Kimberly Klacik	92,825	28.0
Write-in		1,089	0.3
Total votes		330,998	99.9
Democratic hold			

=== November 2024 congressional election ===
Republican primary

2024 Maryland's 2nd Congressional District election Republican primary
Party	Candidate	Votes	%
Republican	Kimberly Klacik	25,377	63.1
Republican	Dave Wallace	9,433	23.5
Republican	John Thormann	5,414	13.5
Total votes		40,224	100.0

General election

2024 Maryland's 2nd congressional district election
Party	Candidate	Votes	%
Democratic	Johnny Olszewski	223,797	58.16%
Republican	Kimberly Klacik	152,079	39.52%
Libertarian	Jasen Wunder	8,169	2.12%
Write-in		749	0.19%
Total votes		384,794	100.00%
Democratic hold			

== See also ==
- Black conservatism in the United States
