= Nadia Hashimi =

Afghan-American novelist and pediatrician (born 1977)

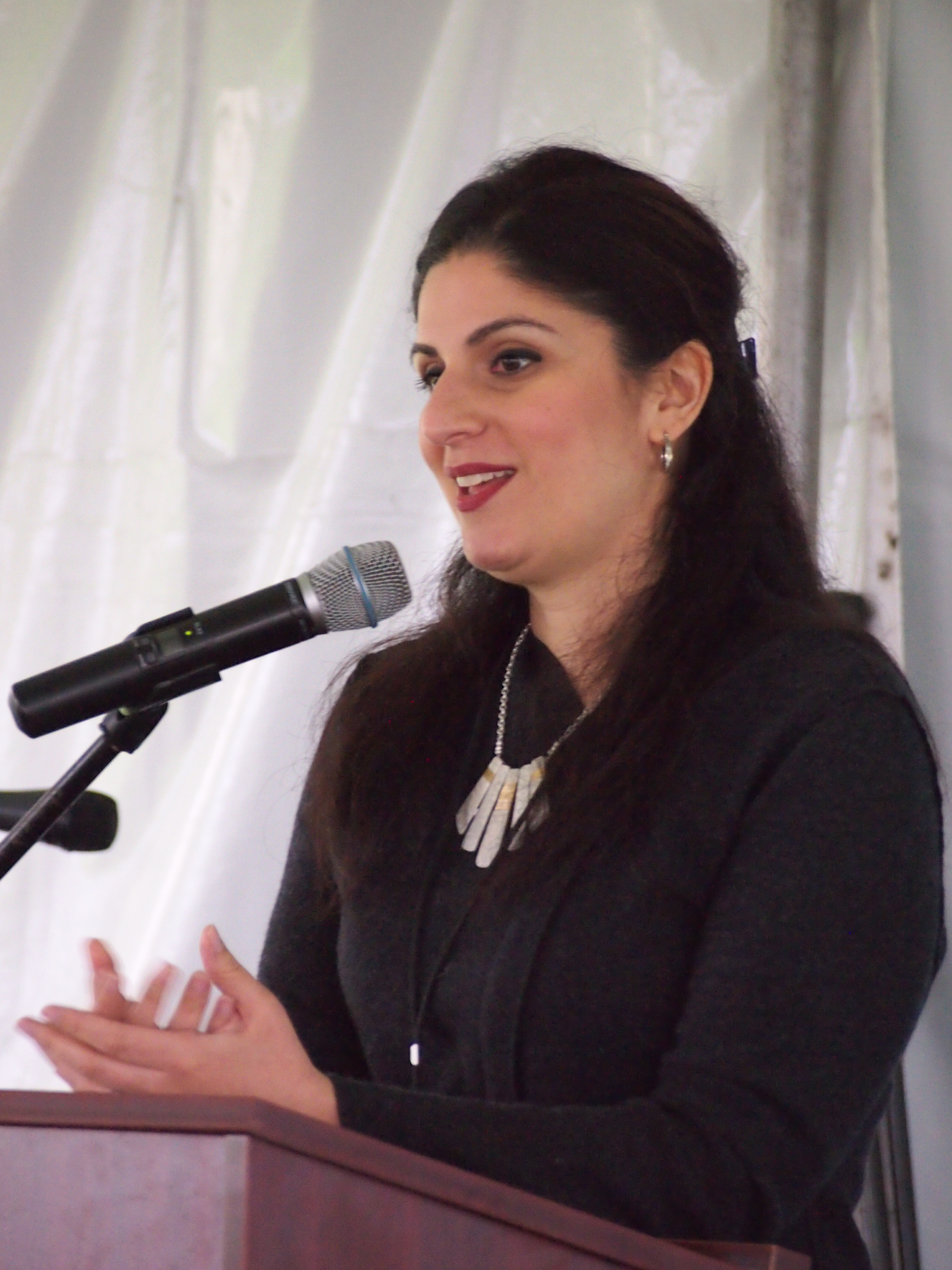
- Born: December 12, 1977 (age 48); Queens, New York, U.S.
- Education: Brandeis University; SUNY Downstate College of Medicine
- Known for: Three-time Bestselling Novelist & first Afghan-American woman to run for Congress.
- Medical career
- Profession: Pediatrician
- Institutions: Washington's Children's National Medical Center
- Sub-specialties: Emergency Room Pediatrics
- Writing career
- Spouse: Dr. Amin Amini (2008–present)
- Children: 4
- Years active: 2010–present
- Genre: Historical fiction
- Notable works: The Pearl that Broke Its Shell; When the Moon Is Low; A House Without Windows
- Website: www.nadiahashimi.com

Nadia Hashimi (born December 12, 1977) is a pediatrician, novelist, and a former Democratic congressional candidate for the United States House of Representatives for Maryland's 6th congressional district. Hashimi is the author of three international bestselling novels, The Pearl that Broke Its Shell, When the Moon Is Low, and A House Without Windows.

== Early life ==
Hashimi was born on December 12, 1977, in Queens, New York, to Afghan parents. Her parents immigrated to the United States in the early 70s. Her mother obtained a master's degree in civil engineering in Holland.

Her parents intended to return to Afghanistan after a few years, but the country became unsafe as a result of the Soviet invasion of Afghanistan.

Nadia Hashimi and her brother were raised in both New Jersey and upstate New York.

== Education and medical career ==
Hashimi attended Brandeis University in Waltham, Massachusetts, where she obtained degrees in Middle Eastern Studies and Biology. She went on to obtain her medical degree from SUNY Downstate. She completed her pediatric training at NYU/Bellevue hospitals in New York City.

In 2008, Hashimi began her medical career working in the emergency department at Children's National Medical Center in Washington, D.C.

== Literary accomplishments ==
In 2014, Hashimi released her debut novel, The Pearl that Broke Its Shell. It is the story of two women in Afghanistan, living a century apart but tied by legacy. In the contemporary storyline, Rahima is made to dress as a bacha posh, a girl dressed as a boy in order to help provide for her family and escort her sisters to school. Shekiba's story lends a historical fiction bend to the novel, as she dresses as a man to guard King Habibullah's harem.

The Pearl that Broke Its Shell is an international bestseller and was a 2014 Goodreads finalist in the categories of Debut Author and Fiction. It has been translated into multiple languages, including: French, Italian, Norwegian, German, Turkish and Hungarian.

Hashimi's second novel, When the Moon Is Low was released in 2015 and is her second international bestseller. It was hailed by O, the Oprah Magazine as "A must-read saga about borders, barriers, and the resolve of one courageous mother fighting to cross over."

Hashimi's third novel, A House Without Windows was released in 2016 and is Hashimi's third international bestseller.

Hashimi has also published two children's books.

Hashimi is also known for her book Sparks Like Stars, which was released in 2021.

== Political career ==
On October 4, 2017, Maryland political reporter Ryan Miner of A Miner Detail blog had an off-the-record conversation with Hashimi and said that soon she may officially declare her candidacy for Maryland's 6th congressional district. During the evening of October 8, Hashimi posted her first campaign advertisement on Facebook, officially declaring her candidacy. She then hosted a Facebook Live forum to explain her policies in detail and take questions from viewers.

Hashimi has received the official endorsement of the Feminist Majority. The endorsement was announced at the 2018 Women's March in DC by Eleanor Smeal, president and co-founder of Feminist Majority Foundation. Smeal introduced Hashimi as the first Afghan-American woman and pediatrician to run for Congress. Addressing the crowd, Hashimi stated, "I attended this march last year. I was outraged. I stood with fellow physicians, ready to demand change, and this year I stand in front of this crowd as a candidate because I decided, like so many of you, that enough is enough, and if we are the majority then we should look like it." She then noted that she was the daughter of Afghan decedents, who are from a place that "could be classified as one of those 'bleep hole countries,'" a reference to Trump's "s—hole countries" comment, reportedly made to a group of senators discussing immigration legislation.

Hashimi's campaign has focused on bringing her medical expertise into Congress. If elected, she would be the first female Democratic physician to serve as a voting member of Congress. She was defeated by David Trone (40%-10%).

== Personal life ==
In 2008, Hashimi and her husband moved to Potomac, Maryland. Her husband, a Maryland-based neurosurgeon, arrived in the United States as a refugee, a fact she shared when speaking against the Travel Ban 3.0 at a protest in front of the Supreme Court. The protest was also attended by Congresswoman Judy Chu and Congressman Dan Kildee.

Hashimi has stated that "The Afghan culture has always been part of my daily life". She has repeatedly joked about her traditional Afghan wedding, with the Washington Post reporting, "'It was a medium-size wedding by Afghan standards,' Hashimi said, recalling the reception with a mere 200 guests." She has described it as "the Afghan equivalent of My Big Fat Greek Wedding."

Hashimi and her husband have four children.
