= 2020 United States House of Representatives elections in Maryland =

- November 3, 2020

All 8 Maryland seats to the United States House of Representatives
	Majority party	Minority party
Party	Democratic	Republican
Last election	7	1
Seats won	7	1
Seat change	Steady	Steady
Popular vote	1,912,740	1,028,150
Percentage	64.75%	34.80%
Swing	▼0.55%	▲2.52%

Democratic
50–60%
60–70%
70–80%
80–90%
>90%
Republican
50–60%
60–70%
70–80%

The 2020 United States House of Representatives elections in Maryland was held on November 3, 2020, to elect the eight U.S. representatives from the state of Maryland, one from each of the state's eight congressional districts. The elections coincided with the 2020 U.S. presidential election, as well as other elections to the House of Representatives, elections to the United States Senate, and various state and local elections. On March 17, 2020, Governor Larry Hogan announced that the primary election would be postponed from April 28 to June 2 due to coronavirus concerns. On March 26, the Maryland Board of Elections met to consider whether in-person voting should be used for June's primary, and recommended that voting in June be mail-in only.

== Overview ==
District	Democratic		Republican		Others		Total		Result
District	Votes	%	Votes	%	Votes	%	Votes	%	Result
District 1	143,877	36.38%	250,901	63.43%	746	0.19%	395,524	100.0%	Republican hold
District 2	224,836	67.72%	106,355	32.03%	835	0.25%	332,026	100.0%	Democratic hold
District 3	260,358	69.76%	112,117	30.04%	731	0.20%	373,206	100.0%	Democratic hold
District 4	282,119	79.58%	71,671	20.22%	739	0.21%	354,529	100.0%	Democratic hold
District 5	274,210	68.75%	123,525	30.97%	1,104	0.28%	398,839	100.0%	Democratic hold
District 6	215,540	58.82%	143,599	39.19%	7,295	1.99%	366,434	100.0%	Democratic hold
District 7	237,084	71.63%	92,825	28.04%	1,089	0.33%	330,998	100.0%	Democratic hold
District 8	274,716	68.23%	127,157	31.58%	741	0.18%	402,614	100.0%	Democratic hold
Total	1,912,740	64.75%	1,028,150	34.80%	13,280	0.45%	2,954,170	100.0%	

Popular vote
Democratic	64.75%
Republican	34.80%
Other	0.45%

House seats
Democratic	87.50%
Republican	12.50%

== District 1 ==
2020 Maryland's 1st congressional district election
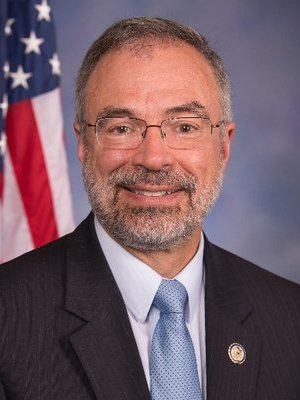

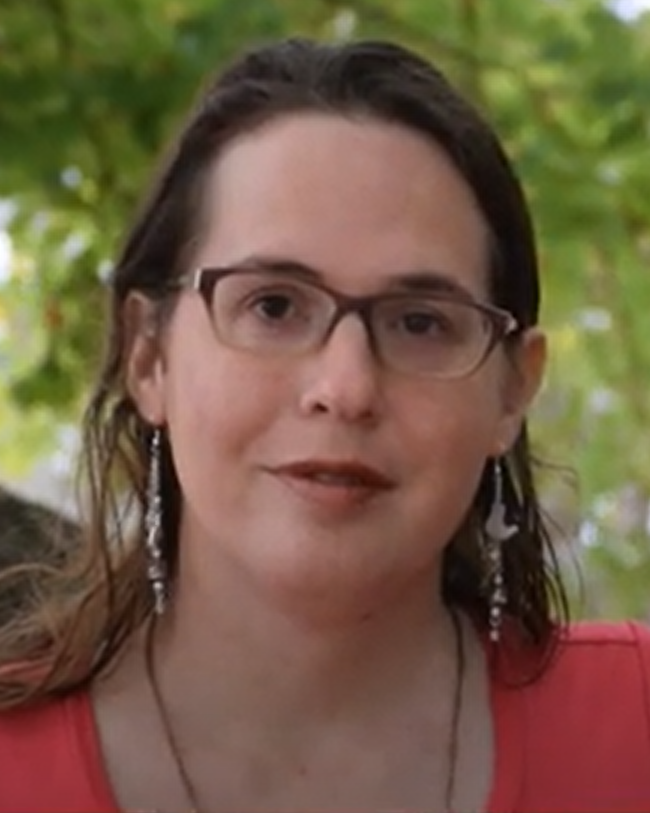
Nominee	Andy Harris	Mia Mason
Party	Republican	Democratic
Popular vote	250,901	143,877
Percentage	63.4%	36.4%
- Harris: 50–60% 60–70% 70–80% 80–90% >90% Mason: 50–60% 60–70% 70–80% 80–90% No votes
U.S. Representative before election
Andy Harris
Republican
Elected U.S. Representative
Andy Harris
Republican

The 1st district encompasses the entire Eastern Shore of Maryland, including Salisbury, as well as parts of Baltimore, Harford and Carroll counties. The incumbent was Republican Andy Harris, who was reelected with 60.0% of the vote in 2018.

=== Democratic primary ===
==== Candidates ====
===== Declared =====
- Mia Mason, veteran of the United States Navy, Army and District of Columbia National Guard, 2018 Green candidate for the U.S. Senate from Maryland
- Jennifer Pingley, registered nurse

===== Withdrawn =====
- Allison Galbraith, Democratic candidate for Maryland's 1st congressional district in 2018
- Erik Lane, technology consultant and businessman

==== Endorsements ====
Mia Mason

U.S. senators

- Chris Van Hollen, U.S. senator from Maryland (2017–)

==== Primary results ====
Democratic primary results
Party	Candidate	Votes	%
Democratic	Mia Mason	25,772	42.8
Democratic	Allison Galbraith	22,386	37.2
Democratic	Jennifer Pingley	12,040	20.0
Total votes		60,198	100.0

=== Republican primary ===
==== Candidates ====
===== Declared =====
- Jorge Delgado, former congressional staffer, activist
- Andy Harris, incumbent U.S. representative

==== Primary results ====
Republican primary results
Party	Candidate	Votes	%
Republican	Andy Harris (incumbent)	72,265	81.6
Republican	Jorge Delgado	16,281	18.4
Total votes		88,546	100.0

=== General election ===
==== Predictions ====
Source	Ranking	As of
The Cook Political Report	Safe R	July 2, 2020
Inside Elections	Safe R	June 2, 2020
Sabato's Crystal Ball	Safe R	July 2, 2020
Politico	Safe R	April 19, 2020
Daily Kos	Safe R	June 3, 2020
RCP	Safe R	June 9, 2020
Niskanen	Safe R	June 7, 2020

==== Results ====
Maryland's 1st congressional district, 2020
Party	Candidate	Votes	%
Republican	Andy Harris (incumbent)	250,901	63.4
Democratic	Mia Mason	143,877	36.4
Write-in		746	0.2
Total votes		395,524	100.0
Republican hold			

== District 2 ==
2020 Maryland's 2nd congressional district election
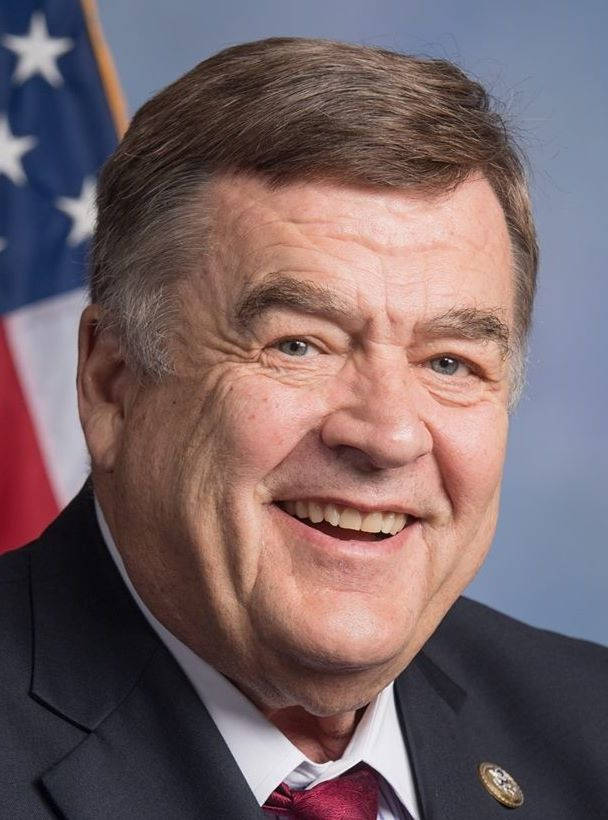

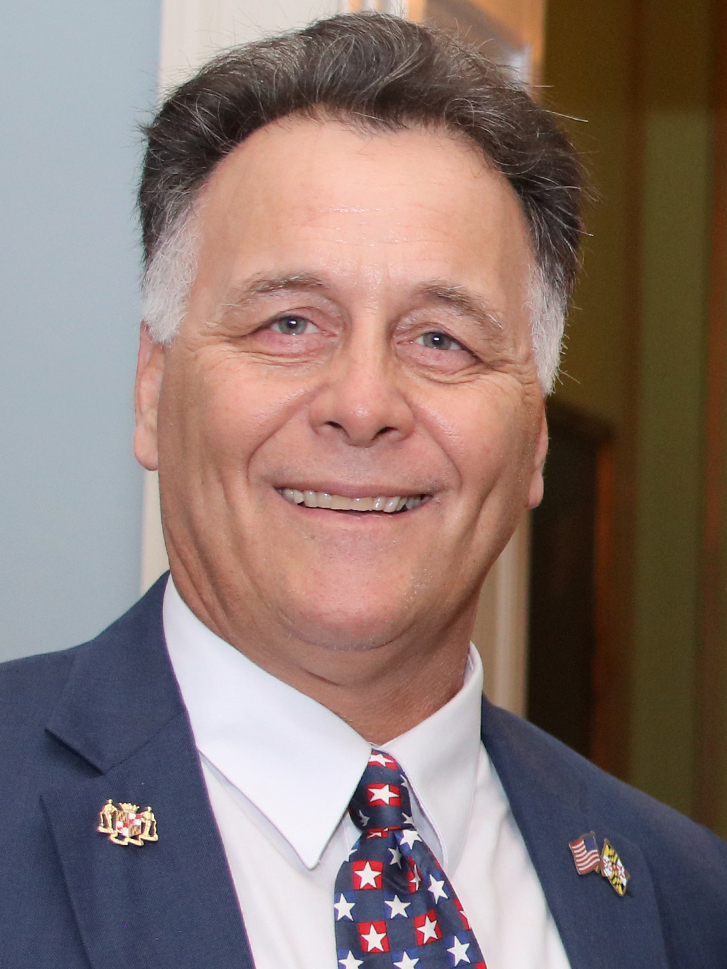
Nominee	Dutch Ruppersberger	Johnny Ray Salling
Party	Democratic	Republican
Popular vote	224,836	106,355
Percentage	67.7%	32.0%
- Ruppersberger: 50–60% 60–70% 70–80% 80–90% >90% Salling: 50–60% 60–70% 70–80% No votes
U.S. Representative before election
Dutch Ruppersberger
Democratic
Elected U.S. Representative
Dutch Ruppersberger
Democratic

The 2nd district encompasses the suburbs of Baltimore, including Brooklyn Park, Towson, Nottingham, and Dundalk, and also includes a small part of eastern Baltimore. The incumbent was Democrat Dutch Ruppersberger, who was reelected with 66.0% of the vote in 2018.

=== Democratic primary ===
==== Candidates ====
===== Declared =====
- Michael Feldman, progressive activist and blogger
- Jake Pretot, small business owner, US Army veteran
- Dutch Ruppersberger, incumbent U.S. representative

==== Primary results ====
Democratic primary results
Party	Candidate	Votes	%
Democratic	Dutch Ruppersberger (incumbent)	82,167	73.3
Democratic	Michael Feldman	20,222	18.0
Democratic	Jake Pretot	9,780	8.7
Total votes		112,169	100.0

=== Republican primary ===
==== Candidates ====
===== Declared =====
- Scott M. Collier, 2014 and 2018 Independent candidate for Maryland's 6th Senate District
- Tim Fazenbaker, businessman, executive in the HHS Dept.
- Richard Impallaria, state delegate
- Genevieve Morris, health consultant
- Johnny Ray Salling, state senator
- Jim Simpson, economist, former White House budget analyst, businessman and investigative journalist.
- Blaine Taylor, perennial candidate

==== Primary results ====
Republican primary results
Party	Candidate	Votes	%
Republican	Johnny Ray Salling	5,942	19.1
Republican	Genevieve Morris	5,134	16.5
Republican	Tim Fazenbaker	5,123	16.4
Republican	Richard Impallaria	5,061	16.2
Republican	Jim Simpson	4,764	15.3
Republican	Scott M. Collier	3,564	11.4
Republican	Blaine Taylor	1,562	5.0
Total votes		31,150	100.0

=== Independents ===
==== Candidates ====
===== Declared =====
- Jeff Northcott

=== General election ===
==== Predictions ====
Source	Ranking	As of
The Cook Political Report	Safe D	July 2, 2020
Inside Elections	Safe D	June 2, 2020
Sabato's Crystal Ball	Safe D	July 2, 2020
Politico	Safe D	April 19, 2020
Daily Kos	Safe D	June 3, 2020
RCP	Safe D	June 9, 2020
Niskanen	Safe D	June 7, 2020

==== Results ====
Maryland's 2nd congressional district, 2020
Party	Candidate	Votes	%
Democratic	Dutch Ruppersberger (incumbent)	224,836	67.7
Republican	Johnny Ray Salling	106,355	32.0
Write-in		835	0.3
Total votes		332,026	100.0
Democratic hold			

== District 3 ==
2020 Maryland's 3rd congressional district election
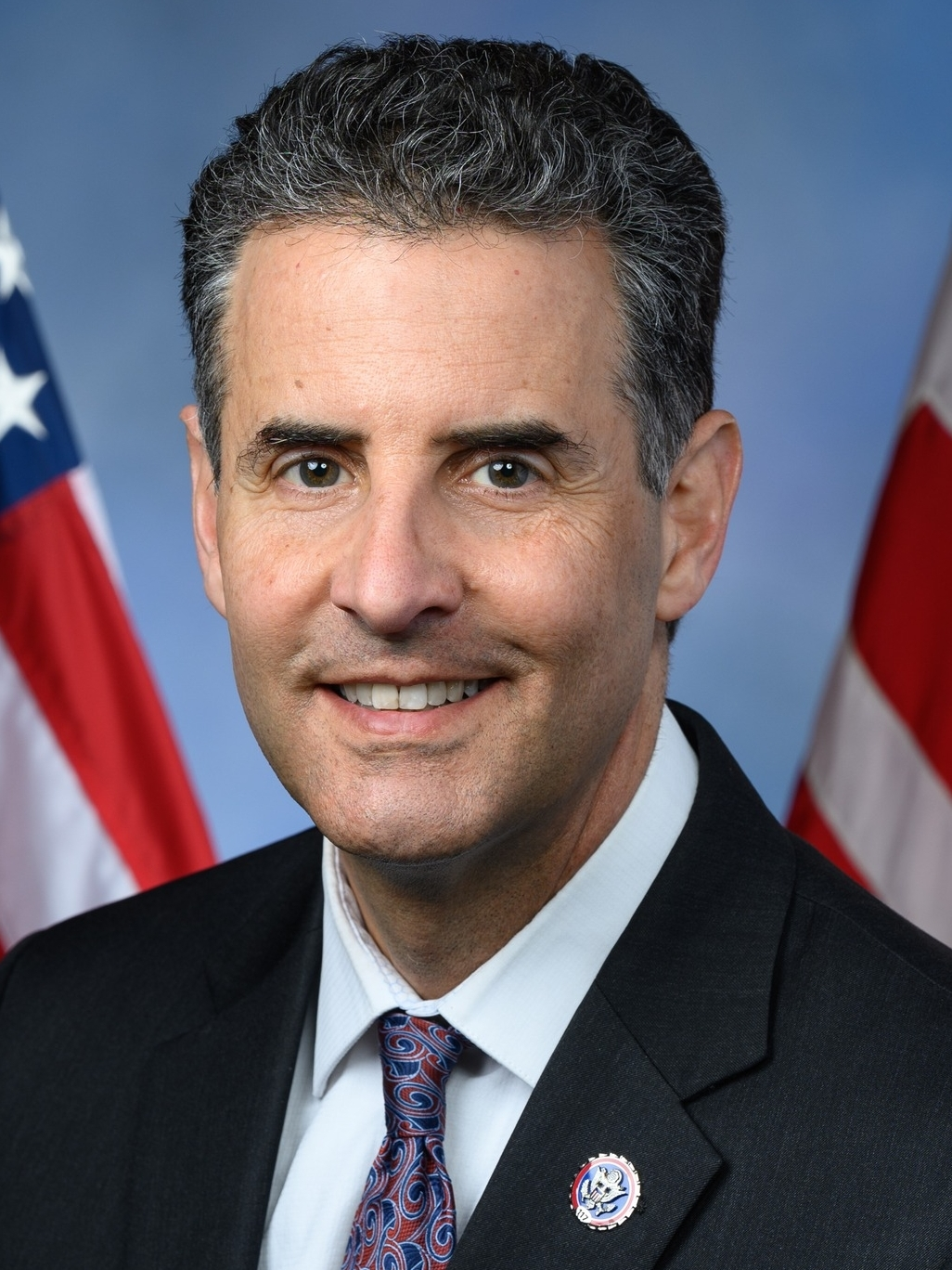

Nominee	John Sarbanes	Charles Anthony
Party	Democratic	Republican
Popular vote	260,358	112,117
Percentage	69.8%	30.0%
- Precinct results Sarbanes: 40–50% 50–60% 60–70% 70–80% 80–90% >90% Anthony: 50–60% 60–70% 70–80% No votes
U.S. Representative before election
John Sarbanes
Democratic
Elected U.S. Representative
John Sarbanes
Democratic

The 3rd district runs along the I-95 corridor from Annapolis into parts of southern and southeastern Baltimore and the northern Baltimore suburbs of Parkville and Pikesville. It also stretches into the Washington, D.C. suburb of Olney. The incumbent was Democrat John Sarbanes, who was reelected with 69.1% of the vote in 2018.

=== Democratic primary ===
==== Candidates ====
===== Declared =====
- Joseph C. Ardito, attorney
- John M. Rea, perennial candidate
- John Sarbanes, incumbent U.S. representative

===== Withdrawn =====
- Carole Brown, attorney

==== Primary results ====
Democratic primary results
Party	Candidate	Votes	%
Democratic	John Sarbanes (incumbent)	110,457	82.5
Democratic	Joseph C. Ardito	17,877	13.4
Democratic	John M. Rea	5,571	4.2
Total votes		133,905	100.0

=== Republican primary ===
==== Candidates ====
===== Declared =====
- Charles Anthony, retired lieutenant colonel of the U.S. Army
- Thomas E. "Pinkston" Harris, perennial candidate
- Reba A. Hawkins, community activist
- Joshua M. Morales, political candidate
- Rob Seyfferth, grocery store clerk

===== Withdrawn =====
- Michael Jette, doctoral candidate at Liberty University

==== Primary results ====
Republican primary results
Party	Candidate	Votes	%
Republican	Charles Anthony	12,040	41.7
Republican	Reba A. Hawkins	6,535	22.6
Republican	Thomas E. "Pinkston" Harris	4,623	16.0
Republican	Rob Seyfferth	3,210	11.1
Republican	Joshua M. Morales	2,487	8.6
Total votes		28,895	100.0

=== General election ===
==== Predictions ====
Source	Ranking	As of
The Cook Political Report	Safe D	July 2, 2020
Inside Elections	Safe D	June 2, 2020
Sabato's Crystal Ball	Safe D	July 2, 2020
Politico	Safe D	April 19, 2020
Daily Kos	Safe D	June 3, 2020
RCP	Safe D	June 9, 2020
Niskanen	Safe D	June 7, 2020

==== Results ====
Maryland's 3rd congressional district, 2020
Party	Candidate	Votes	%
Democratic	John Sarbanes (incumbent)	260,358	69.8
Republican	Charles Anthony	112,117	30.0
Write-in		731	0.2
Total votes		373,206	100.0
Democratic hold			

== District 4 ==
2020 Maryland's 4th congressional district election
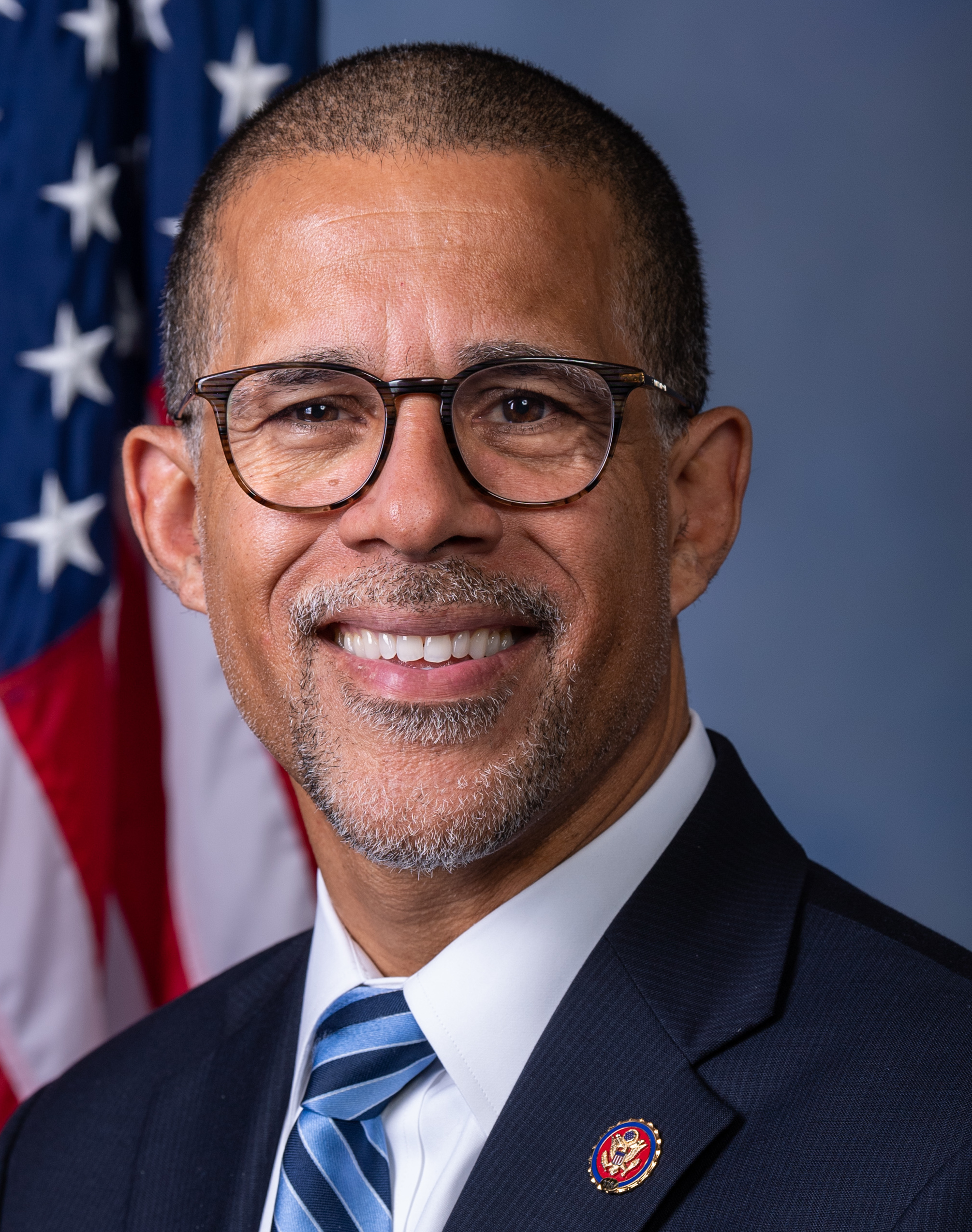

Nominee	Anthony Brown	George McDermott
Party	Democratic	Republican
Popular vote	282,119	71,671
Percentage	79.6%	20.2%
- Precinct results Brown: 50–60% 60–70% 70–80% 80–90% >90% McDermott: 50–60% 60–70% 70–80% No votes
U.S. Representative before election
Anthony Brown
Democratic
Elected U.S. Representative
Anthony Brown
Democratic

The 4th district encompasses parts of the Washington, D.C. suburbs in Prince George's County, including Landover, Laurel, and Suitland. It also extends into central Anne Arundel County, including Severna Park. The incumbent was Democrat Anthony Brown, who was reelected with 78.1% of the vote in 2018.

=== Democratic primary ===
==== Candidates ====
===== Declared =====
- Anthony Brown, incumbent U.S. representative
- Shelia Bryant, attorney and military veteran
- Kim A. Shelton, bus operator

==== Endorsements ====
Anthony Brown

Local officials

- Pete Buttigieg, former mayor of South Bend, Indiana (2012–2020) and former candidate for 2020 Democratic presidential nomination.

Organizations

- Brady Campaign
- Humane Society of the United States Legislative Fund
- League of Conservation Voters Action Fund
- National Education Association
- Planned Parenthood Action Fund
- Sierra Club
Shelia Bryant

Organizations

- American Progressives in STEM
- Brand New Congress
- National Women's Political Caucus

==== Primary results ====
Democratic primary results
Party	Candidate	Votes	%
Democratic	Anthony Brown (incumbent)	110,232	77.6
Democratic	Shelia Bryant	26,735	18.8
Democratic	Kim A. Shelton	5,044	3.6
Total votes		142,011	100.0

=== Republican primary ===
==== Candidates ====
===== Declared =====
- Nnabu Eze, Republican candidate for US Senate in 2018, Green candidate for Maryland's 3rd congressional district in 2016
- Eric Loeb, anti-gerrymandering activist
- George E. McDermott, Republican candidate for Maryland's 4th congressional district in 2018, Democratic candidate for Maryland's 4th congressional district in 2012

==== Primary results ====
Republican primary results
Party	Candidate	Votes	%
Republican	George E. McDermott	11,131	56.4
Republican	Nnabu Eze	4,512	22.9
Republican	Eric Loeb	4,098	20.8
Total votes		19,741	100.0

=== General election ===
==== Predictions ====
Source	Ranking	As of
The Cook Political Report	Safe D	July 2, 2020
Inside Elections	Safe D	June 2, 2020
Sabato's Crystal Ball	Safe D	July 2, 2020
Politico	Safe D	April 19, 2020
Daily Kos	Safe D	June 3, 2020
RCP	Safe D	June 9, 2020
Niskanen	Safe D	June 7, 2020

==== Results ====
Maryland's 4th congressional district, 2020
Party	Candidate	Votes	%
Democratic	Anthony Brown (incumbent)	282,119	79.6
Republican	George McDermott	71,671	20.2
Write-in		739	0.2
Total votes		354,529	100.0
Democratic hold			

== District 5 ==
2020 Maryland's 5th congressional district election
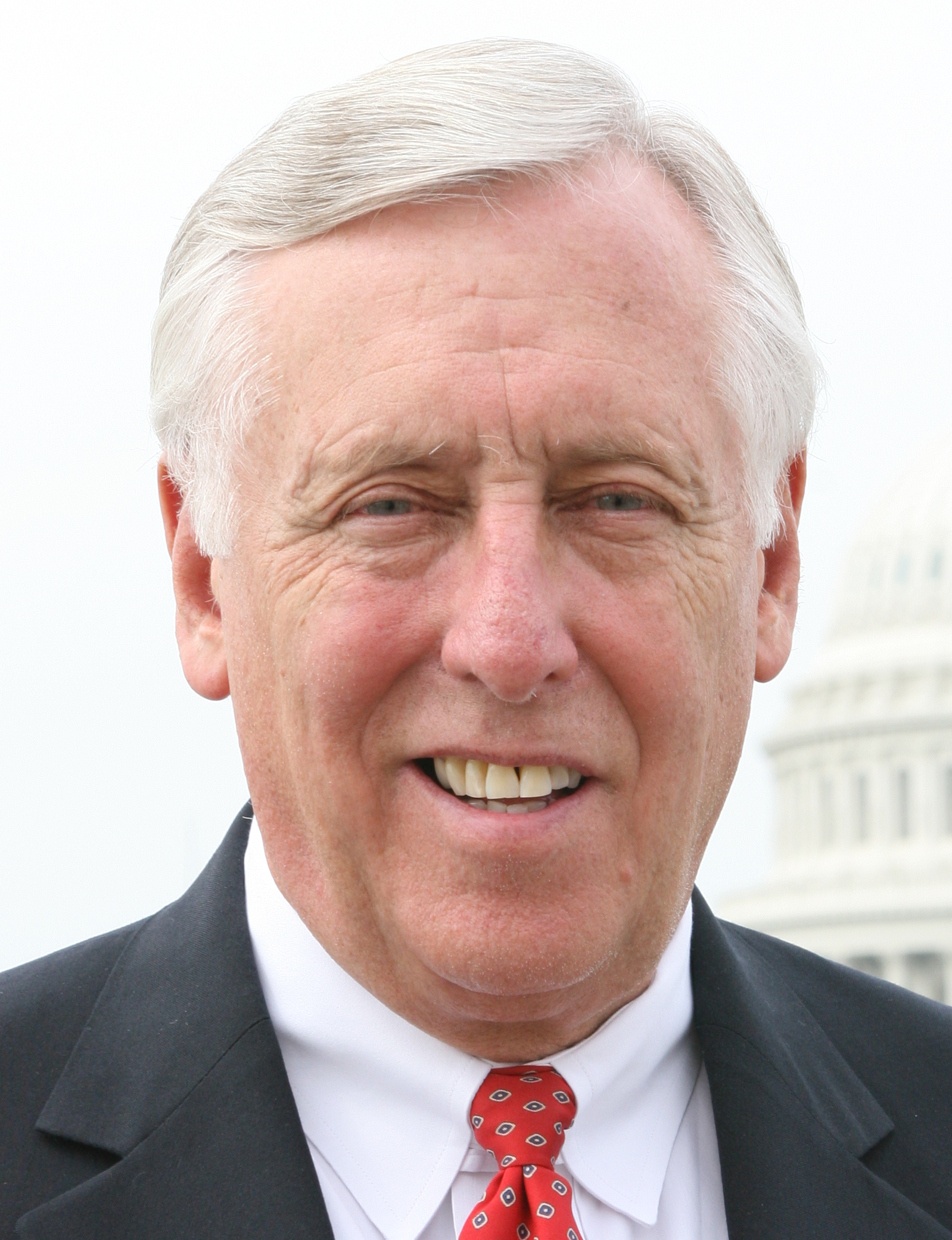

Nominee	Steny Hoyer	Chris Palombi
Party	Democratic	Republican
Popular vote	274,210	123,525
Percentage	68.8%	31.0%
- Precinct results Hoyer: 50–60% 60–70% 70–80% 80–90% >90% Palombi: 50–60% 60–70% 70–80% No votes
U.S. Representative before election
Steny Hoyer
Democratic
Elected U.S. Representative
Steny Hoyer
Democratic

The 5th district is based in southern Maryland, and encompasses Charles, St. Mary's, Calvert counties and a small portion of southern Anne Arundel County, as well as the Washington, D.C. suburbs of College Park, Bowie, and Upper Marlboro. The incumbent was Democrat Steny Hoyer, the current House Majority Leader, who was reelected with 70.3% of the vote in 2018.

=== Democratic primary ===
==== Candidates ====
===== Declared =====
- William A. Devine III, 2018 Republican nominee for the 5th district
- Vanessa Marie Hoffman, businesswoman
- Steny Hoyer, incumbent U.S. representative
- Briana Urbina, former special education teacher and civil rights attorney
- Mckayla Wilkes, activist

==== Endorsements ====
Steny Hoyer

Organizations

- Humane Society of the United States Legislative Fund
- League of Conservation Voters Action Fund
- NARAL Pro-Choice America
- National Education Association
- Planned Parenthood Action Fund
Mckayla Wilkes

Organizations

- 350.org
- American Progressives in STEM
- Brand New Congress
- College Democrats of America - Frostburg State University chapter
- College Democrats of America - Salisbury University chapter
- Democracy for America
- Democratic Socialists of America - Metro DC chapter
- Income Movement
- Jewish Voice for Peace Action
- Our Revolution - Maryland chapter

==== Primary results ====
Democratic primary results
Party	Candidate	Votes	%
Democratic	Steny Hoyer (incumbent)	96,664	64.4
Democratic	Mckayla Wilkes	40,105	26.7
Democratic	Vanessa Marie Hoffman	6,357	4.2
Democratic	Briana Urbina	4,091	2.7
Democratic	William Devine	2,851	1.9
Total votes		150,068	100.0

=== Republican primary ===
==== Candidates ====
===== Declared =====
- Bryan DuVal Cubero, veteran
- Lee Havis, IMS executive director
- Kenneth Lee, firefighter
- Chris Palombi, former policeman
- Doug Sayers, veteran

===== Withdrawn =====
- Mark S. Leishear, former political candidate

==== Primary results ====
Republican primary results
Party	Candidate	Votes	%
Republican	Chris Palombi	11,761	36.0
Republican	Doug Sayers	9,727	29.8
Republican	Kenneth Lee	5,008	15.3
Republican	Lee Havis	3,593	11.0
Republican	Bryan DuVal Cubero	2,585	7.9
Total votes		32,674	100.0

=== Independents ===
==== Candidates ====
===== Declared =====
- Rashad D. Lloyd, Universal Basic Income activist

=== General election ===
==== Predictions ====
Source	Ranking	As of
The Cook Political Report	Safe D	July 2, 2020
Inside Elections	Safe D	June 2, 2020
Sabato's Crystal Ball	Safe D	July 2, 2020
Politico	Safe D	April 19, 2020
Daily Kos	Safe D	June 3, 2020
RCP	Safe D	June 9, 2020
Niskanen	Safe D	June 7, 2020

==== Results ====
Maryland's 5th congressional district, 2020
Party	Candidate	Votes	%
Democratic	Steny Hoyer (incumbent)	274,210	68.8
Republican	Chris Palombi	123,525	31.0
Write-in		1,104	0.3
Total votes		398,839	100.0
Democratic hold			

== District 6 ==
2020 Maryland's 6th congressional district election
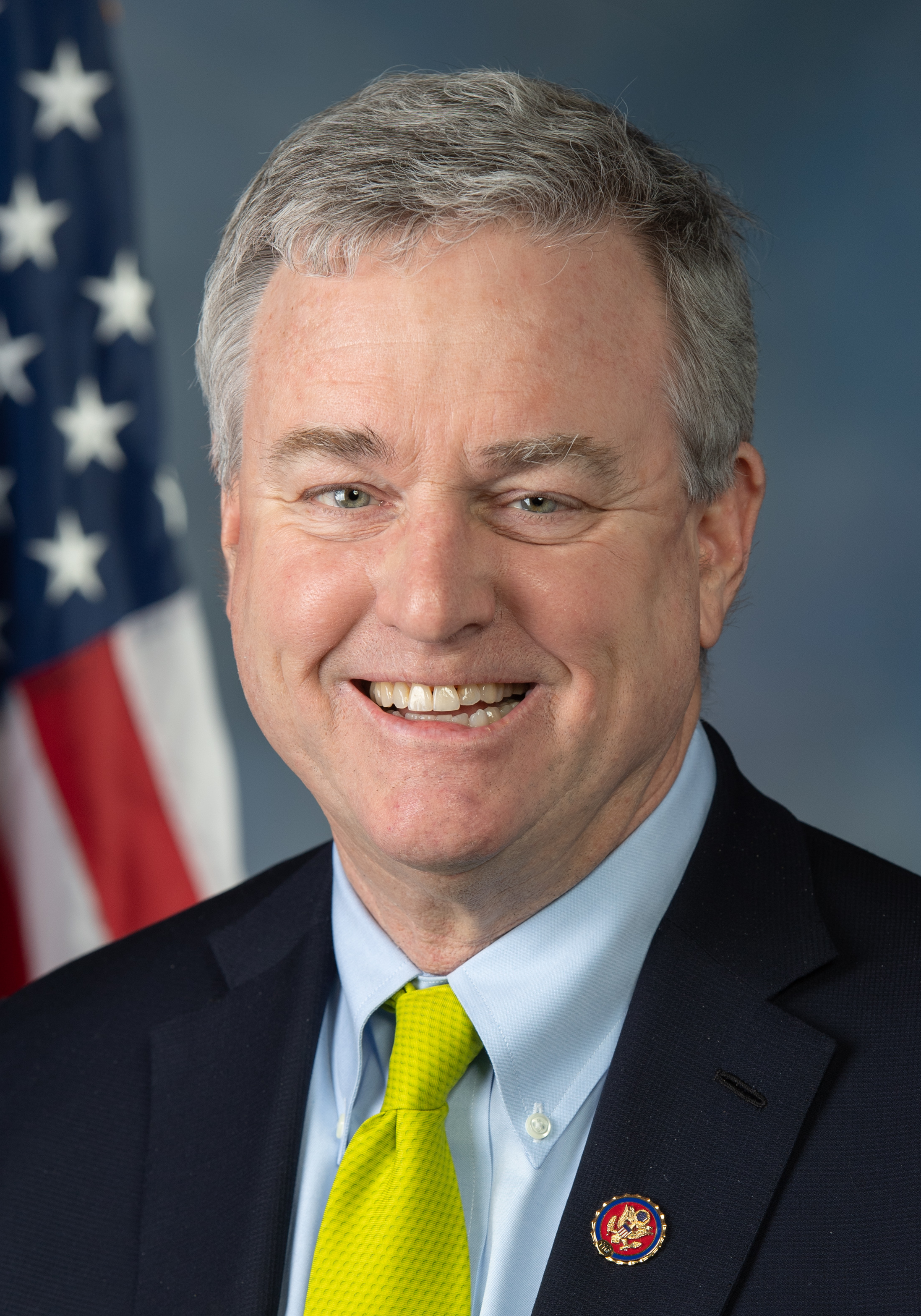

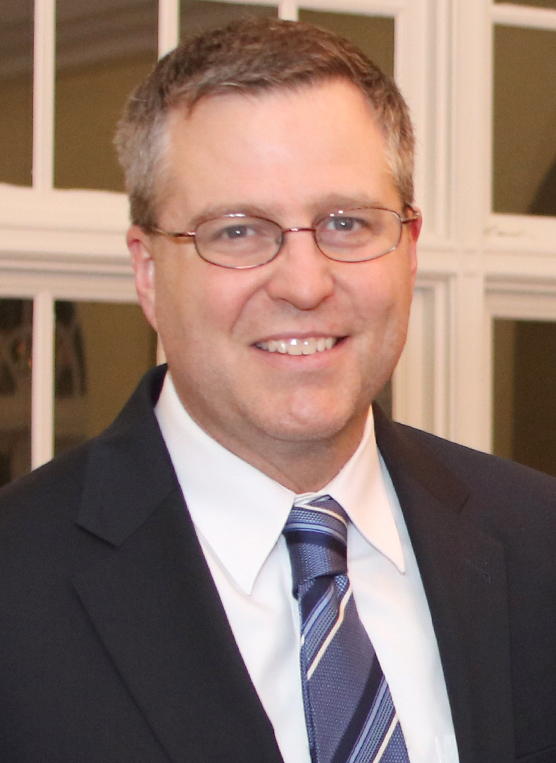
Nominee	David Trone	Neil Parrott
Party	Democratic	Republican
Popular vote	215,540	143,599
Percentage	58.8%	39.2%
- Precinct results Trone: 50–60% 60–70% 70–80% 80–90% >90% Parrott: 40–50% 50–60% 60–70% 70–80% 80–90% No votes
U.S. Representative before election
David Trone
Democratic
Elected U.S. Representative
David Trone
Democratic

The 6th district is based in western Maryland, and covers all of Garrett, Allegany, and Washington counties, and parts of Frederick County. It also extends south into the Washington, D.C. suburbs in Montgomery County, including Potomac and Germantown. The incumbent was Democrat David Trone, who was elected with 59.0% of the vote in 2018.

=== Democratic primary ===
==== Candidates ====
===== Declared =====
- Maxwell Bero, local high school teacher
- David Trone, incumbent U.S. Representative

==== Endorsements ====
David Trone

Organizations

- Equality PAC
- Humane Society of the United States Legislative Fund
- NARAL Pro-Choice America
- National Education Association
- Planned Parenthood Action Fund
- Sierra Club

==== Primary results ====
Democratic primary results
Party	Candidate	Votes	%
Democratic	David Trone (incumbent)	65,655	72.4
Democratic	Maxwell Bero	25,037	27.6
Total votes		90,692	100.0

=== Republican primary ===
==== Candidates ====
===== Declared =====
- Kevin T. Caldwell, Libertarian candidate for Maryland's 6th congressional district in 2018
- Chris P. Meyyur
- Neil Parrott, state delegate

==== Primary results ====
Republican primary results
Party	Candidate	Votes	%
Republican	Neil Parrott	28,804	65.2
Republican	Kevin T. Caldwell	11,258	25.5
Republican	Chris P. Meyyur	4,113	9.3
Total votes		44,175	100.0

=== General election ===
==== Predictions ====
Source	Ranking	As of
The Cook Political Report	Safe D	July 2, 2020
Inside Elections	Safe D	June 2, 2020
Sabato's Crystal Ball	Safe D	July 2, 2020
Politico	Safe D	April 19, 2020
Daily Kos	Safe D	June 3, 2020
RCP	Safe D	June 9, 2020
Niskanen	Safe D	June 7, 2020

==== Results ====
Maryland's 6th congressional district, 2020
Party	Candidate	Votes	%
Democratic	David Trone (incumbent)	215,540	58.8
Republican	Neil Parrott	143,599	39.2
Green	George Gluck	6,893	1.9
Write-in		402	0.1
Total votes		366,434	100.0
Democratic hold			

== District 7 ==
2020 Maryland's 7th congressional district election
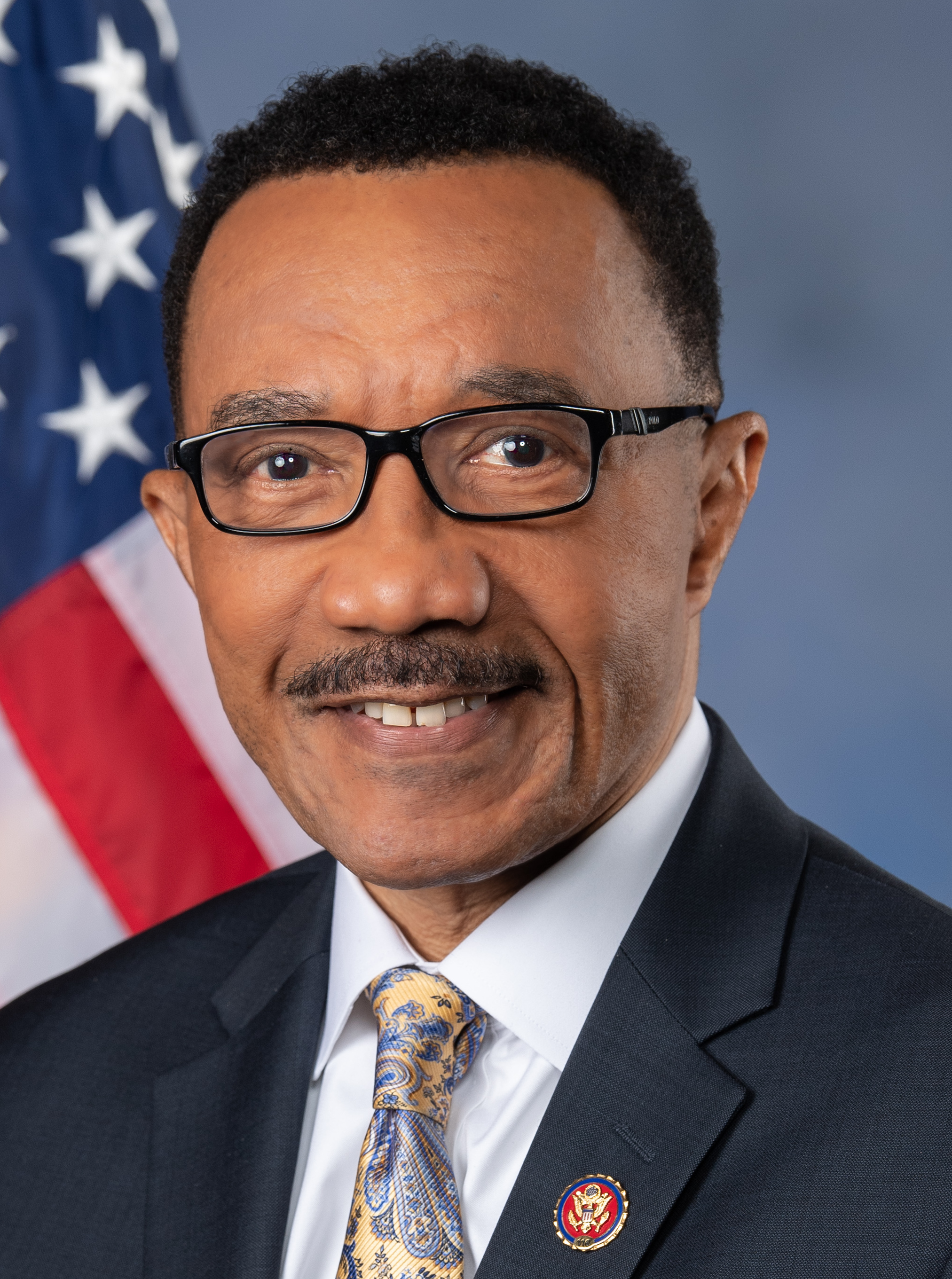

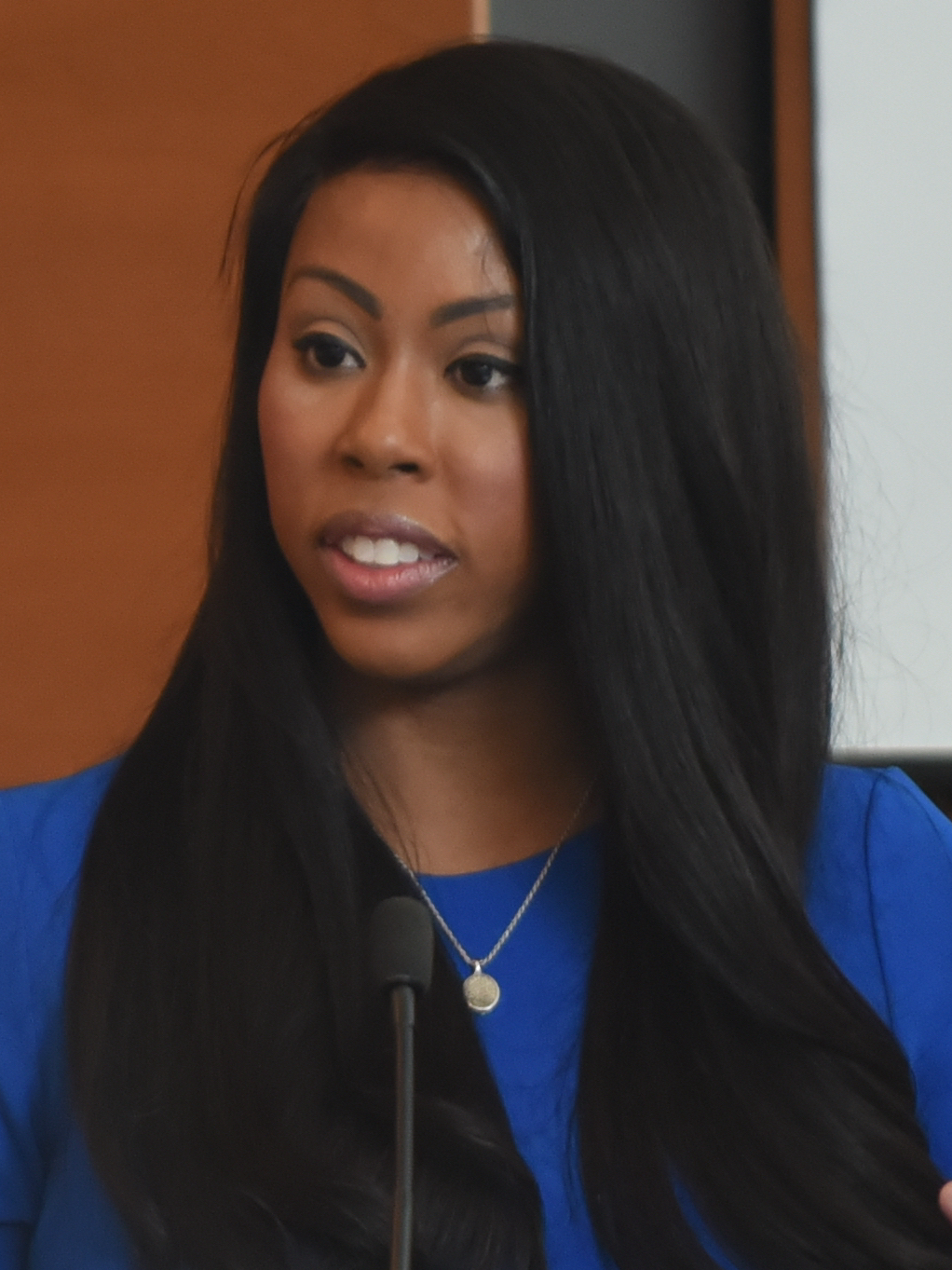
Nominee	Kweisi Mfume	Kimberly Klacik
Party	Democratic	Republican
Popular vote	237,084	92,825
Percentage	71.6%	28.0%
- Precinct results Mfume: 50–60% 60–70% 70–80% 80–90% >90% Klacik: 50–60% 60–70% 70–80% Tie: 50% No votes
U.S. Representative before election
Kweisi Mfume
Democratic
Elected U.S. Representative
Kweisi Mfume
Democratic

The 7th district is centered around the city of Baltimore, and includes Downtown Baltimore as well as northern and western Baltimore. It also extends into the western Baltimore suburbs of Woodlawn, Catonsville, Ellicott City, and Columbia, and rural northern Baltimore County. The incumbent was Democrat Elijah Cummings, who was reelected with 76.4% of the vote in 2018. Cummings died in office on October 17, 2019. Former congressman Kweisi Mfume won the special election on April 28, 2020, with 73.5% of the vote.

=== Democratic primary ===
==== Candidates ====
===== Declared =====
- T. Dan Baker, high school math teacher
- Alicia D. Brown
- Jill P. Carter, state senator
- Matko Lee Chullin III
- Maya Rockeymoore Cummings, former chairwoman of the Maryland Democratic Party and widow of U.S. Representative Elijah Cummings
- Michael Davidson
- Darryl Gonzalez, author
- Mark Gosnell, pulmonologist
- Dan Hiegel, Democratic candidate for Maryland's 3rd congressional district in 1994 and 1996
- Michael D. Howard Jr.
- Jay Jalisi, state delegate
- Kweisi Mfume, incumbent representative and former president and CEO of the NAACP
- Adrian Petrus, 2018 Democratic candidate for the Maryland State Senate, District 47, Democratic candidate for Maryland's 7th congressional district in 2016
- Saafir Rabb, community activist
- Gary Schuman
- Charles U. Smith, Democratic candidate for Maryland's 7th congressional district in 2018
- Harry Spikes, former Cummings staffer, 2014 Democratic candidate for the Maryland House of Delegates, District 45
- Charles Stokes, Democratic candidate for Maryland's 7th congressional district in 2018
- Jeff Woodard

===== Withdrawn =====
- Talmadge Branch, state delegate — withdrew candidacy on February 5, 2020
- Brian Britcher, firefighter — withdrew candidacy on November 7, 2019
- Leslie Grant, former president of the National Dental Association — withdrew candidacy on February 6, 2020
- F. Michael Higginbotham, professor, University of Baltimore School of Law — withdrew candidacy on February 6, 2020
- Terri Hill, state delegate — withdrew candidacy on February 6, 2020

==== Primary results ====
Democratic primary results
Party	Candidate	Votes	%
Democratic	Kweisi Mfume (incumbent)	113,061	74.3
Democratic	Maya Rockeymoore Cummings	15,208	10.0
Democratic	Jill P. Carter	13,237	8.7
Democratic	Alicia D. Brown	1,841	1.2
Democratic	Charles Stokes	1,356	0.9
Democratic	T. Dan Baker	1,141	0.7
Democratic	Jay Jalisi	1,056	0.7
Democratic	Harry Spikes	1,040	0.7
Democratic	Saafir Rabb	948	0.6
Democratic	Mark Gosnell	765	0.5
Democratic	Darryl Gonzalez	501	0.3
Democratic	Jeff Woodard	368	0.2
Democratic	Gary Schuman	344	0.2
Democratic	Michael D. Howard Jr.	327	0.2
Democratic	Michael Davidson	298	0.2
Democratic	Dan L. Hiegel	211	0.1
Democratic	Charles U. Smith	189	0.1
Democratic	Matko Lee Chullin	187	0.1
Democratic	Adrian Petrus	170	0.1
Total votes		152,248	100.0

=== Republican primary ===
==== Candidates ====
===== Declared =====
- Ray Bly, Republican candidate for Maryland's 7th congressional district in 2016 and 2018, Republican candidate for Maryland's 2nd congressional district in 2012
- Brian L. Brown
- Kimberly Klacik, community activist and Baltimore County Republican Committeewoman
- M. J. Madwolf
- Liz Matory, nominee for Maryland's 2nd congressional district in 2018
- William Newton, election integrity and community activist, Republican candidate for Maryland's 7th congressional district in 2016 and 2018, and Baltimore County Republican Committeeman

===== Withdrawn =====
- Christopher M. Anderson — withdrew candidacy on December 9, 2019
- Reba A. Hawkins, community activist — withdrew candidacy on January 24, 2020

==== Primary results ====
Republican primary results
Party	Candidate	Votes	%
Republican	Kimberly Klacik	16,465	68.8
Republican	Liz Matory	3,401	14.2
Republican	William T. Newton	1,271	5.3
Republican	Ray Bly	1,234	5.2
Republican	Brian L. Brown	1,134	4.7
Republican	M. J. Madwolf	442	1.8
Total votes		23,947	100.0

=== General election ===
==== Predictions ====
Source	Ranking	As of
The Cook Political Report	Safe D	July 2, 2020
Inside Elections	Safe D	June 2, 2020
Sabato's Crystal Ball	Safe D	July 2, 2020
Politico	Safe D	April 19, 2020
Daily Kos	Safe D	June 3, 2020
RCP	Safe D	June 9, 2020
Niskanen	Safe D	June 7, 2020

==== Results ====
Maryland's 7th congressional district, 2020
Party	Candidate	Votes	%
Democratic	Kweisi Mfume (incumbent)	237,084	71.6
Republican	Kimberly Klacik	92,825	28.0
Write-in		1,089	0.3
Total votes		330,998	100.0
Democratic hold			

== District 8 ==
2020 Maryland's 8th congressional district election
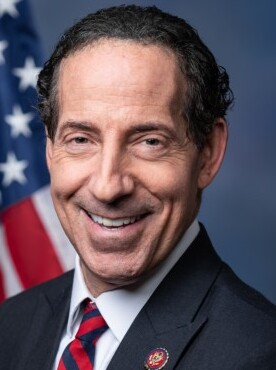

Nominee	Jamie Raskin	Gregory Thomas Coll
Party	Democratic	Republican
Popular vote	274,716	127,157
Percentage	68.2%	31.6%
- Precinct results Raskin: 50–60% 60–70% 70–80% 80–90% >90% Coll: 40–50% 50–60% 60–70% 70–80% No votes
U.S. Representative before election
Jamie Raskin
Democratic
Elected U.S. Representative
Jamie Raskin
Democratic

The 8th district stretches from the northern Washington, D.C. suburbs north toward the Pennsylvania border. It is represented by Democrat Jamie Raskin, who was reelected with 68.2% of the vote in 2018.

=== Democratic primary ===
==== Candidates ====
===== Declared =====
- Marcia H. Morgan
- Utam Paul
- Jamie Raskin, incumbent U.S. representative
- Lih Young, Democratic candidate for Maryland's 8th congressional district in 2014 and 2018, Democratic candidate for United States Senate in 2006, 2010, 2012, and 2016.

==== Endorsements ====
Jamie Raskin

Organizations

- Humane Society of the United States Legislative Fund
- National Education Association
- Sierra Club

==== Primary results ====
Democratic primary results
Party	Candidate	Votes	%
Democratic	Jamie Raskin (incumbent)	111,894	86.8
Democratic	Marcia H. Morgan	10,236	7.9
Democratic	Lih Young	4,874	3.8
Democratic	Utam Paul	1,885	1.5
Total votes		128,889	100.0

=== Republican primary ===
==== Candidates ====
===== Declared =====
- Gregory Thomas Coll
- Bridgette L. Cooper, opera singer and former music educator, 2018 Republican candidate in the 8th district
- Nicholas Gladden, businessman and contractor
- Patricia Rogers
- Shelly Skolnick
- Michael Yadeta, businessman and engineer

==== Primary results ====
Republican primary results
Party	Candidate	Votes	%
Republican	Gregory Thomas Coll	13,070	41.8
Republican	Bridgette L. Cooper	4,831	15.4
Republican	Nicholas Gladden	4,019	12.8
Republican	Patricia Rogers	3,868	12.4
Republican	Shelly Skolnick	2,979	9.5
Republican	Michael Yadeta	2,526	8.1
Total votes		31,293	100.0

=== General election ===
==== Predictions ====
Source	Ranking	As of
The Cook Political Report	Safe D	July 2, 2020
Inside Elections	Safe D	June 2, 2020
Sabato's Crystal Ball	Safe D	July 2, 2020
Politico	Safe D	April 19, 2020
Daily Kos	Safe D	June 3, 2020
RCP	Safe D	June 9, 2020
Niskanen	Safe D	June 7, 2020

==== Results ====
Maryland's 8th congressional district, 2020
Party	Candidate	Votes	%
Democratic	Jamie Raskin (incumbent)	274,716	68.2
Republican	Gregory Thomas Coll	127,157	31.6
Write-in		741	0.2
Total votes		402,614	100.0
Democratic hold			
