= 2018 United States House of Representatives elections in Maryland =

- November 6, 2018

All 8 Maryland seats to the United States House of Representatives
	Majority party	Minority party
Party	Democratic	Republican
Last election	7	1
Seats won	7	1
Seat change	Steady	Steady
Popular vote	1,493,047	737,906
Percentage	65.30%	32.28%
Swing	▲4.87%	▼3.26%

Democratic
50–60%
60–70%
70–80%
80–90%
>90%
Republican
40–50%
50–60%
60–70%
70–80%

The 2018 United States House of Representatives elections in Maryland were held on November 6, 2018, electing the eight U.S. representatives from the State of Maryland, one from each of the state's eight congressional districts. The elections coincided with the elections of other offices, including a gubernatorial election, other elections to the House of Representatives, elections to the United States Senate, and various state and local elections.

== Overview ==
United States House of Representatives elections in Maryland, 2018
Party	Votes	Percentage	+/–	Seats	+/–
Democratic	1,493,047	65.30%	+4.87%	7	-
Republican	737,906	32.28%	-3.26%	1	-
Libertarian	43,005	1.88%	-0.35%		-
Green	10,261	0.45%	-1.19%		-
Others	2,065	0.09%	-0.07%		-
Totals	2,286,284	100.00%	-	8	-

Popular vote
Democratic	65.30%
Republican	32.28%
Other	2.43%

House seats
Democratic	87.50%
Republican	12.50%

=== By district ===
Results of the 2018 United States House of Representatives elections in Maryland by district:

District	Democratic		Republican		Others		Total		Result
District	Votes	%	Votes	%	Votes	%	Votes	%	Result
District 1	116,631	38.09%	183,662	59.98%	5,893	1.93%	306,186	100.0%	Republican hold
District 2	167,201	66.01%	77,782	30.71%	8,319	3.28%	253,302	100.0%	Democratic hold
District 3	202,407	69.11%	82,774	28.26%	7,699	2.63%	292,880	100.0%	Democratic hold
District 4	209,642	78.05%	53,327	19.85%	5,614	2.09%	268,583	100.0%	Democratic hold
District 5	213,796	70.28%	82,361	27.07%	8,052	2.65%	304,209	100.0%	Democratic hold
District 6	163,346	58.95%	105,209	37.97%	8,529	3.08%	277,084	100.0%	Democratic hold
District 7	202,345	76.44%	56,266	21.26%	6,099	2.30%	264,710	100.0%	Democratic hold
District 8	217,679	68.17%	96,525	30.23%	5,126	1.61%	319,330	100.0%	Democratic hold
Total	1,493,047	65.30%	737,906	32.28%	55,331	2.42%	2,286,284	100.0%	

== District 1 ==
2018 Maryland's 1st congressional district election
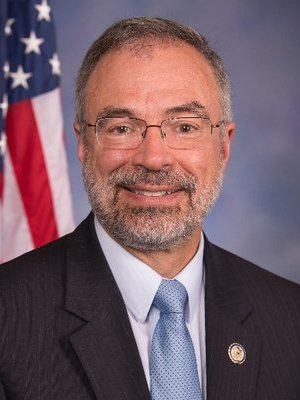

Nominee	Andy Harris	Jesse Colvin
Party	Republican	Democratic
Popular vote	183,662	116,631
Percentage	60.0%	38.1%
- Harris: 40–50% 50–60% 60–70% 70–80% 80–90% >90% Colvin: 40–50% 50–60% 60–70% 70–80% 80–90% >90% Tie: 40–50% No votes
U.S. Representative before election
Andy Harris
Republican
Elected U.S. Representative
Andy Harris
Republican

The incumbent was Republican Andy Harris, who had represented the district since 2011. Harris was re-elected with 67% of the vote in 2016.

The Democratic Congressional Campaign Committee included Maryland's 1st congressional district on its initial list of Republican-held seats considered targets in 2018.

=== Democratic primary ===
- Michael Brown
- Jesse Colvin, Army Ranger
- Allison Galbraith, small business owner
- Erik Lane
- Michael Pullen, former attorney
- Steve Worton

==== Primary results ====
Democratic primary results
Party	Candidate	Votes	%
Democratic	Jesse Colvin	13,599	38.1
Democratic	Allison Galbraith	9,977	28.0
Democratic	Michael Brown	5,354	15.0
Democratic	Michael Pullen	4,569	12.8
Democratic	Steve Worton	1,377	3.9
Democratic	Erik Lane	773	2.2
Total votes		35,649	100.0

=== Republican primary ===
- Martin Elborn, law enforcement
- Andy Harris, incumbent
- Lamont Taylor, small businessman

==== Primary results ====
Republican primary results
Party	Candidate	Votes	%
Republican	Andy Harris (incumbent)	47,590	85.8
Republican	Martin Elborn	5,429	9.8
Republican	Lamont Taylor	2,419	4.4
Total votes		55,438	100.0

=== General election ===
==== Predictions ====
Source	Ranking	As of
The Cook Political Report	Safe R	November 5, 2018
Inside Elections	Safe R	November 5, 2018
Sabato's Crystal Ball	Safe R	November 5, 2018
RCP	Safe R	November 5, 2018
Daily Kos	Safe R	November 5, 2018
538	Safe R	November 7, 2018
CNN	Safe R	October 31, 2018
Politico	Safe R	November 4, 2018

==== Results ====
Maryland's 1st congressional district, 2018
Party	Candidate	Votes	%
Republican	Andy Harris (incumbent)	183,662	60.0
Democratic	Jesse Colvin	116,631	38.1
Libertarian	Jenica Martin	5,744	1.9
n/a	Write-ins	149	0.0
Total votes		306,186	100.0
Republican hold			

== District 2 ==
2018 Maryland's 2nd congressional district election
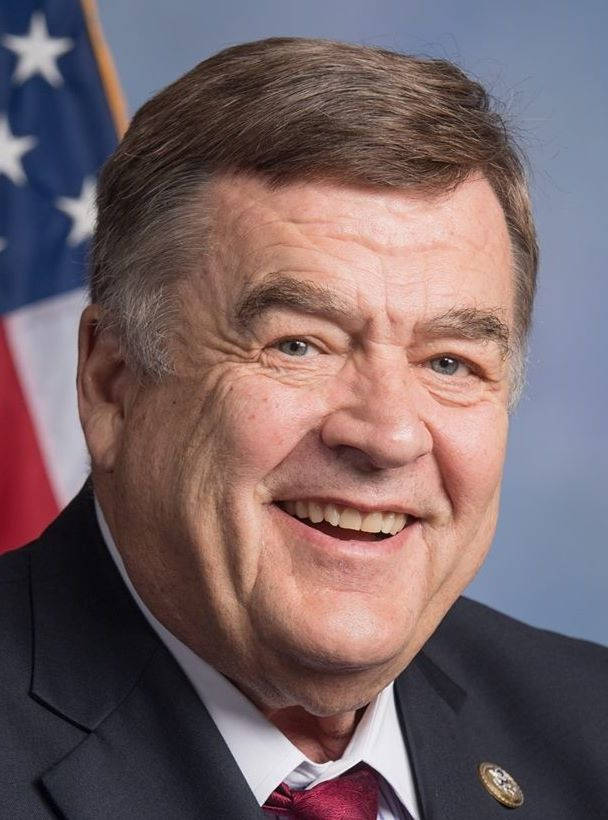

Nominee	Dutch Ruppersberger	Liz Matory
Party	Democratic	Republican
Popular vote	167,201	77,782
Percentage	66.0%	30.7%
- Ruppersberger: 40–50% 50–60% 60–70% 70–80% 80–90% >90% Matory: 40–50% 50–60% 60–70% 70–80% Tie: 40–50% 50% No votes
U.S. Representative before election
Dutch Ruppersberger
Democratic
Elected U.S. Representative
Dutch Ruppersberger
Democratic

The incumbent was Democrat Dutch Ruppersberger, who had represented the district since 2003. Ruppersberger was re-elected with 62% of the vote in 2016.

=== Democratic primary ===
- Jake Pretot
- Dutch Ruppersberger, incumbent

==== Primary results ====
Democratic primary results
Party	Candidate	Votes	%
Democratic	Dutch Ruppersberger (incumbent)	45,674	78.2
Democratic	Jake Pretot	12,738	21.8
Total votes		58,412	100.0

=== Republican primary ===
- Liz Matory, small business owner
- Hubert Owens Jr.
- Mark Shell
- Mitchell Toland Jr.

==== Primary results ====
Republican primary results
Party	Candidate	Votes	%
Republican	Liz Matory	7,137	42.0
Republican	Mark Shell	4,048	23.8
Republican	Mitchell Toland Jr.	2,921	17.2
Republican	Hubert Owens Jr.	2,903	17.1
Total votes		17,009	100.0

=== General election ===
==== Predictions ====
Source	Ranking	As of
The Cook Political Report	Safe D	November 5, 2018
Inside Elections	Safe D	November 5, 2018
Sabato's Crystal Ball	Safe D	November 5, 2018
RCP	Safe D	November 5, 2018
Daily Kos	Safe D	November 5, 2018
538	Safe D	November 7, 2018
CNN	Safe D	October 31, 2018
Politico	Safe D	November 4, 2018

==== Results ====
Maryland's 2nd congressional district, 2018
Party	Candidate	Votes	%
Democratic	Dutch Ruppersberger (incumbent)	167,201	66.0
Republican	Liz Matory	77,782	30.7
Libertarian	Michael Carney	5,215	2.1
Green	Guillaume "Guy" Mimoun	2,904	1.1
n/a	Write-ins	200	0.1
Total votes		253,302	100.0
Democratic hold			

== District 3 ==
2018 Maryland's 3rd congressional district election
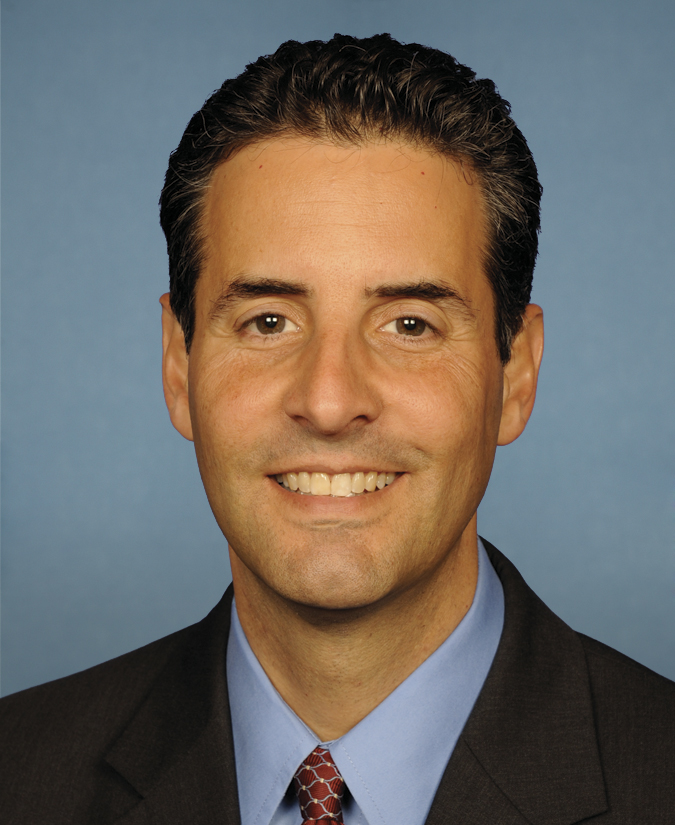

Nominee	John Sarbanes	Charles Anthony
Party	Democratic	Republican
Popular vote	202,407	82,774
Percentage	69.1%	28.3%
- Precinct results Sarbanes: 40–50% 50–60% 60–70% 70–80% 80–90% >90% Anthony: 40–50% 50–60% 60–70% 70–80% No votes
U.S. Representative before election
John Sarbanes
Democratic
Elected U.S. Representative
John Sarbanes
Democratic

The incumbent was Democrat John Sarbanes, who had represented the district since 2007. Sarbanes was re-elected with 63% of the vote in 2016.

=== Democratic primary ===
- Adam DeMarco
- John Rea
- Eduardo Rosas, U.S. Navy (retired), Iraq War combat veteran
- John Sarbanes, incumbent

==== Primary results ====
Democratic primary results
Party	Candidate	Votes	%
Democratic	John Sarbanes (incumbent)	61,203	82.4
Democratic	Adam DeMarco	6,350	8.5
Democratic	Eduardo Rosas	4,568	6.1
Democratic	John Rea	2,180	2.9
Total votes		74,301	100.0

=== Republican primary ===
- Charles Anthony
- Rob Seyfferth

==== Primary results ====
Republican primary results
Party	Candidate	Votes	%
Republican	Charles Anthony	6,648	43.5
Republican	Thomas Harris	5,528	36.1
Republican	Rob Seyfferth	3,121	20.4
Total votes		15,297	100.0

=== General election ===
==== Predictions ====
Source	Ranking	As of
The Cook Political Report	Safe D	November 5, 2018
Inside Elections	Safe D	November 5, 2018
Sabato's Crystal Ball	Safe D	November 5, 2018
RCP	Safe D	November 5, 2018
Daily Kos	Safe D	November 5, 2018
538	Safe D	November 7, 2018
CNN	Safe D	October 31, 2018
Politico	Safe D	November 4, 2018

==== Results ====
Maryland's 3rd congressional district, 2018
Party	Candidate	Votes	%
Democratic	John Sarbanes (incumbent)	202,407	69.1
Republican	Charles Anthony	82,774	28.3
Libertarian	J. David Lashar	7,476	2.6
n/a	Write-ins	223	0.1
Total votes		292,880	100.0
Democratic hold			

== District 4 ==
2018 Maryland's 4th congressional district election
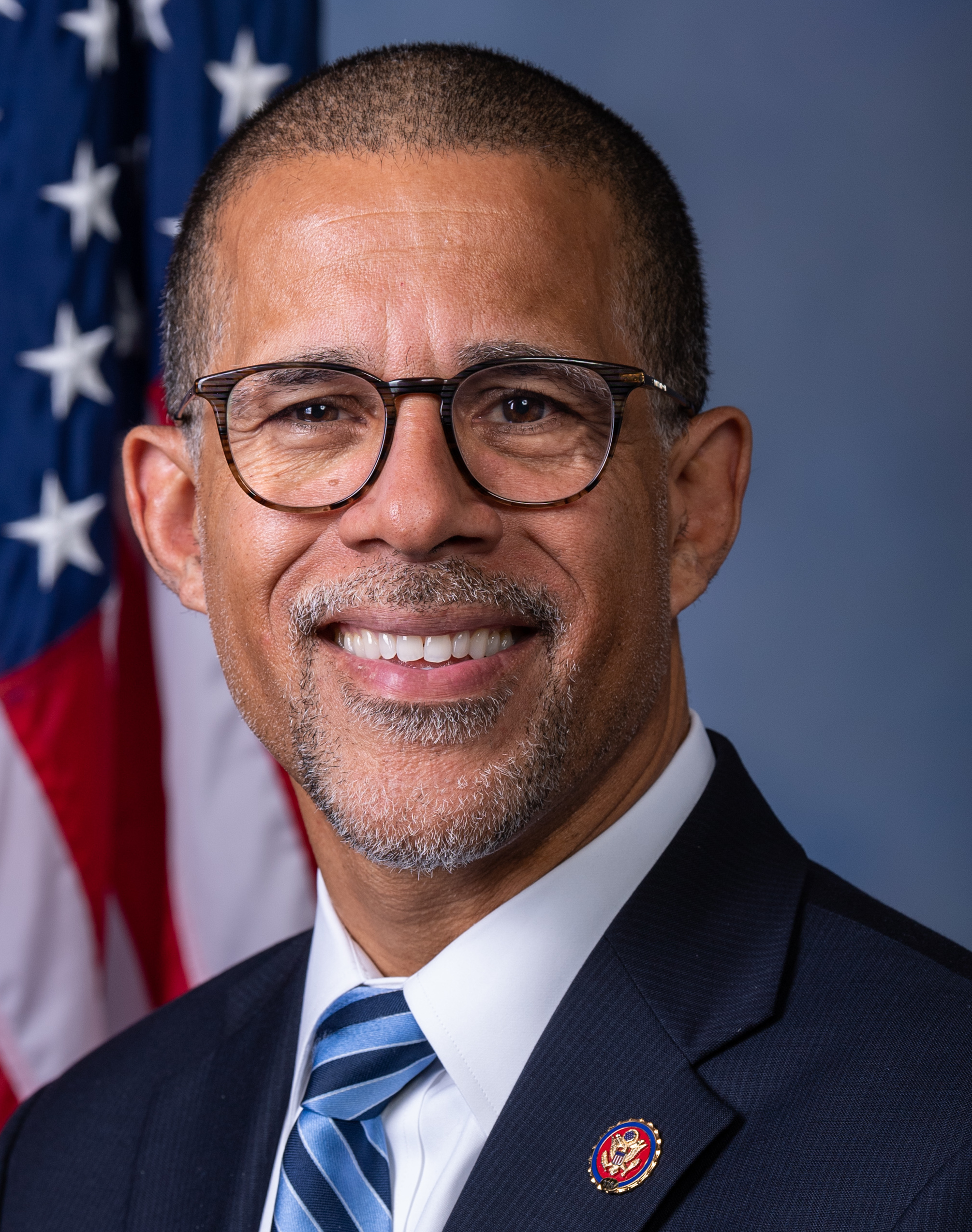

Nominee	Anthony Brown	George McDermott
Party	Democratic	Republican
Popular vote	209,642	53,327
Percentage	78.1%	19.9%
- Precinct results Brown: 40–50% 50–60% 60–70% 70–80% 80–90% >90% McDermott: 40–50% 50–60% 60–70% 70–80% No votes
U.S. Representative before election
Anthony Brown
Democratic
Elected U.S. Representative
Anthony Brown
Democratic

The incumbent was Democrat Anthony Brown, who had represented the district since 2017. Brown was elected with 74% of the vote in 2016.

=== Democratic primary ===
- Anthony Brown, incumbent

==== Primary results ====
Democratic primary results
Party	Candidate	Votes	%
Democratic	Anthony Brown (incumbent)	76,761	100.0
Total votes		76,761	100.0

=== Republican primary ===
- George McDermott

==== Primary results ====
Republican primary results
Party	Candidate	Votes	%
Republican	George McDermott	11,989	100.0
Total votes		11,989	100.0

=== Libertarian Party ===
- Dave Bishop
Dave Bishop

Organizations

- Red Maryland

=== General election ===
==== Predictions ====
Source	Ranking	As of
The Cook Political Report	Safe D	November 5, 2018
Inside Elections	Safe D	November 5, 2018
Sabato's Crystal Ball	Safe D	November 5, 2018
RCP	Safe D	November 5, 2018
Daily Kos	Safe D	November 5, 2018
538	Safe D	November 7, 2018
CNN	Safe D	October 31, 2018
Politico	Safe D	November 4, 2018

==== Results ====
Maryland's 4th congressional district, 2018
Party	Candidate	Votes	%
Democratic	Anthony Brown (incumbent)	209,642	78.1
Republican	George McDermott	53,327	19.9
Libertarian	Dave Bishop	5,326	2.0
n/a	Write-ins	288	0.1
Total votes		268,583	100.0
Democratic hold			

== District 5 ==
2018 Maryland's 5th congressional district election
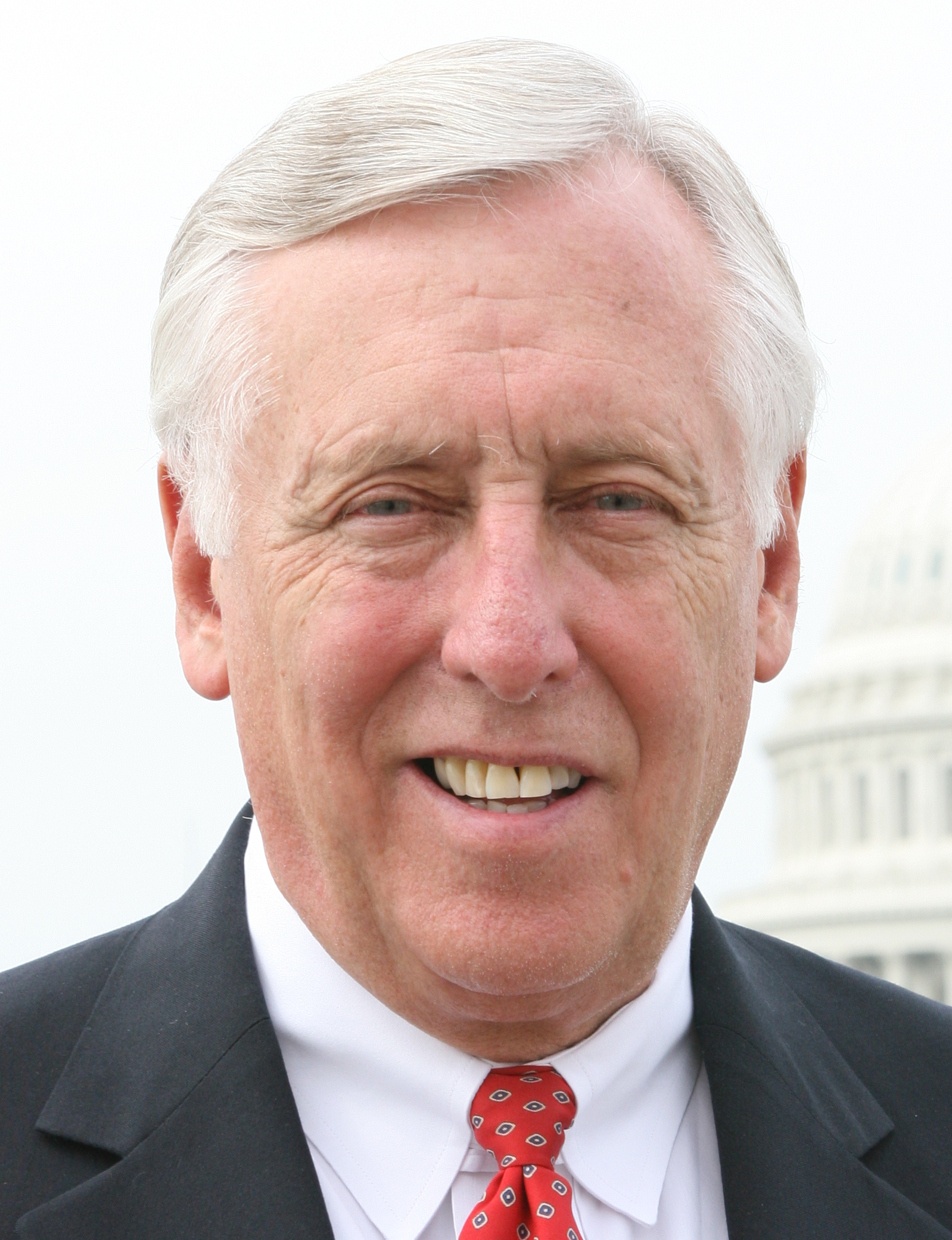

Nominee	Steny Hoyer	William Devine
Party	Democratic	Republican
Popular vote	213,796	82,361
Percentage	70.3%	27.1%
- Precinct results Hoyer: 40–50% 50–60% 60–70% 70–80% 80–90% >90% Devine: 40–50% 50–60% 60–70% No votes
U.S. Representative before election
Steny Hoyer
Democratic
Elected U.S. Representative
Steny Hoyer
Democratic

The incumbent was Democrat Steny Hoyer, who had represented the district since 1981. Hoyer was re-elected with 67% of the vote in 2016.

=== Democratic primary ===
- Dennis Fritz
- Steny Hoyer, incumbent

==== Primary results ====
Democratic primary results
Party	Candidate	Votes	%
Democratic	Steny Hoyer (incumbent)	69,834	84.2
Democratic	Dennis Fritz	13,056	15.8
Total votes		82,890	100.0

=== Republican primary ===
- William Devine III
- Johnny Rice

==== Primary results ====
Republican primary results
Party	Candidate	Votes	%
Republican	William Devine III	10,963	57.5
Republican	Johnny Rice	8,095	42.5
Total votes		19,058	100.0

=== General election ===
==== Predictions ====
Source	Ranking	As of
The Cook Political Report	Safe D	November 5, 2018
Inside Elections	Safe D	November 5, 2018
Sabato's Crystal Ball	Safe D	November 5, 2018
RCP	Safe D	November 5, 2018
Daily Kos	Safe D	November 5, 2018
538	Safe D	November 7, 2018
CNN	Safe D	October 31, 2018
Politico	Safe D	November 4, 2018

==== Results ====
Maryland's 5th congressional district, 2018
Party	Candidate	Votes	%
Democratic	Steny Hoyer (incumbent)	213,796	70.3
Republican	William Devine III	82,361	27.1
Green	Patrick Elder	4,082	1.3
Libertarian	Jacob Pulcher	3,592	1.2
n/a	Write-ins	279	0.1
Republican	Johnny Rice (write-in)	99	0.0
Total votes		304,479	100.0
Democratic hold			

== District 6 ==
2018 Maryland's 6th congressional district election
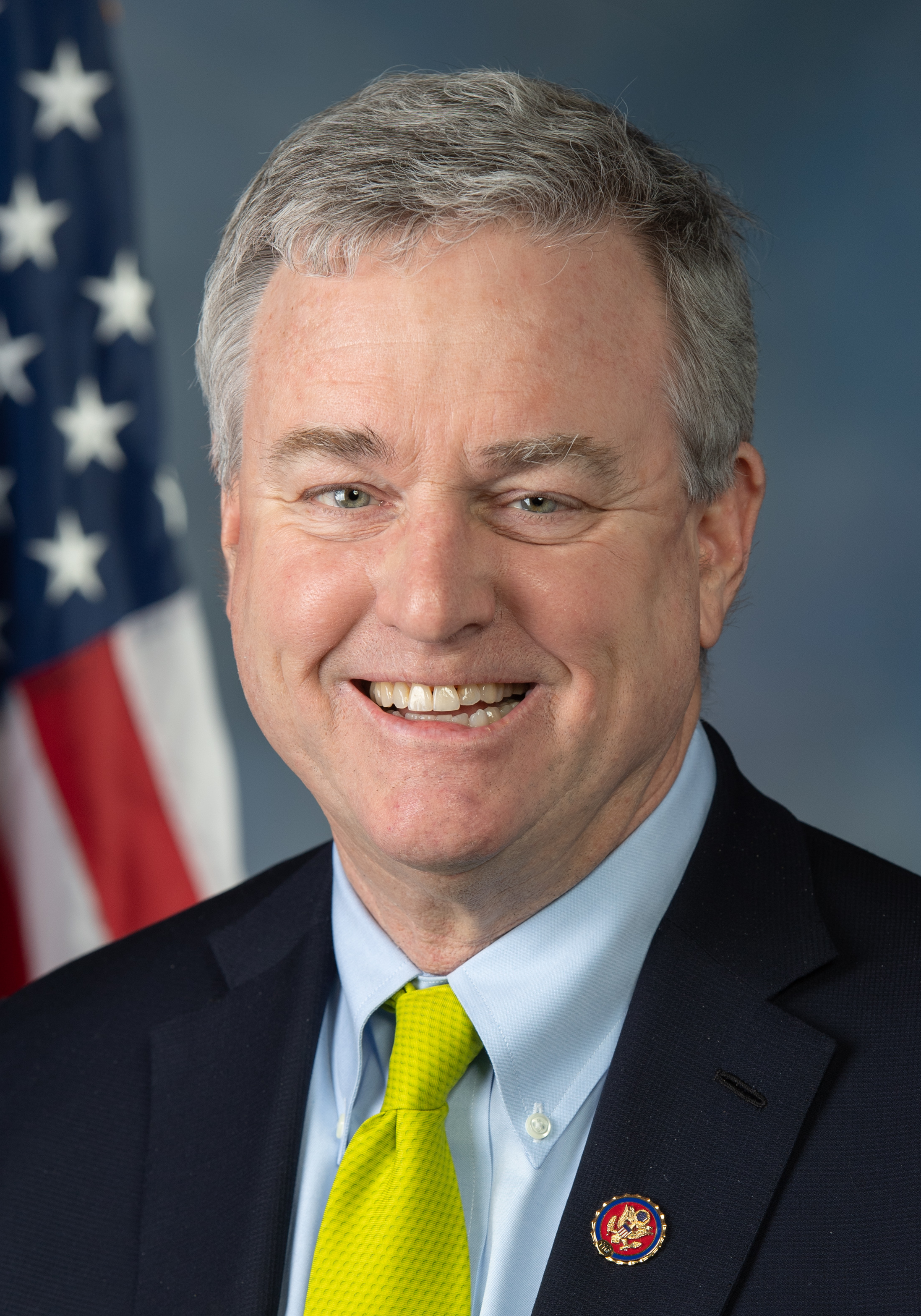

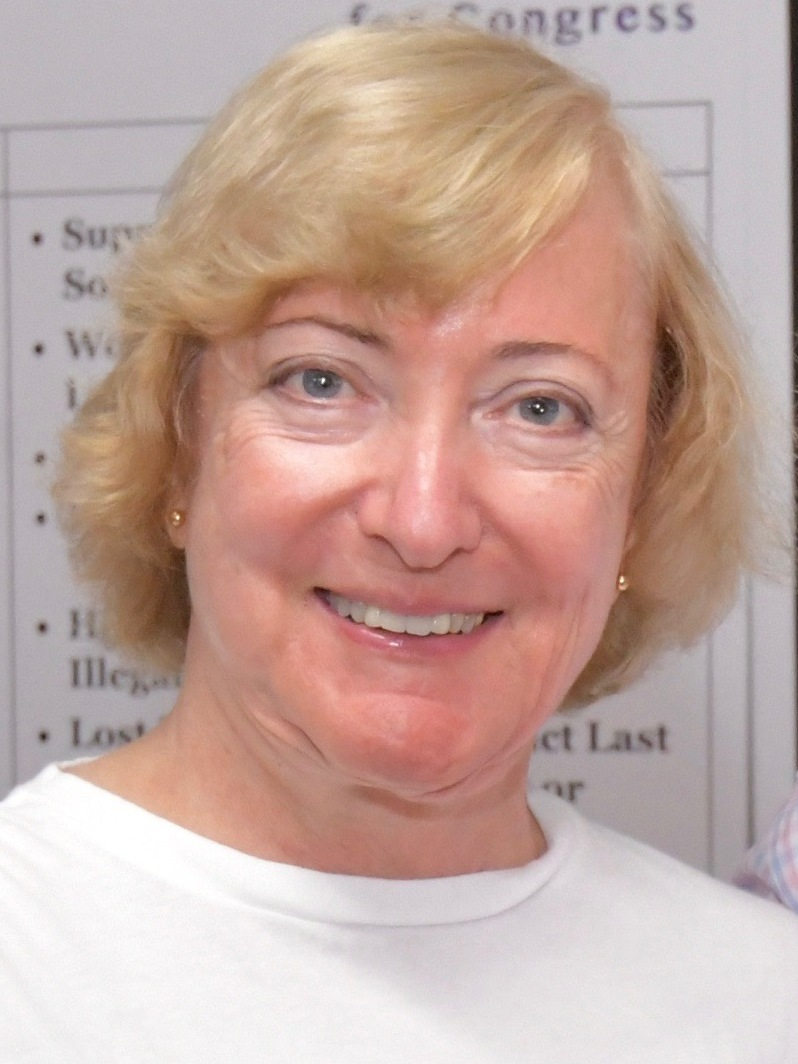
Nominee	David Trone	Amie Hoeber
Party	Democratic	Republican
Popular vote	163,346	105,209
Percentage	59.0%	38.0%
- Precinct results Trone: 40–50% 50–60% 60–70% 70–80% 80–90% >90% Hoeber: 40–50% 50–60% 60–70% 70–80% 80–90% >90% Tie: 40–50% 50% No votes
U.S. Representative before election
John Delaney
Democratic
Elected U.S. Representative
David Trone
Democratic

The incumbent was Democrat John Delaney, who had represented the district since 2013. Delaney was re-elected with 56% of the vote in 2016.

Delaney later retired to seek the Democratic Party's nomination for president of the United States in 2020. This is the last election without Neil Parrott as the Republican nominee.

=== Democratic primary ===
- Andrew Duck, Democratic candidate for Maryland's 6th congressional district in 2006 and 2010
- George English
- Chris Graves
- Nadia Hashimi, emergency pediatrician and novelist
- Christopher Hearsey
- Roger Manno, member of the Maryland Senate for the 19th district
- Aruna Miller, member of the Maryland House of Delegates for the 15th district
- David Trone, businessman and candidate for Maryland's 8th congressional district in 2016

==== Primary results ====
Democratic primary results
Party	Candidate	Votes	%
Democratic	David Trone	22,855	40.4
Democratic	Aruna Miller	17,311	30.6
Democratic	Nadia Hashimi	5,871	10.4
Democratic	Roger Manno	5,788	10.2
Democratic	Andrew Duck	2,758	4.9
Democratic	Chris Graves	900	1.6
Democratic	George English	577	1.0
Democratic	Christopher Hearsey	479	0.8
Total votes		56,539	100

=== Republican primary ===
- Kurt Elsasser, former U.S. Marine
- Amie Hoeber, former deputy under secretary of the Army and nominee in 2016
- Lisa Lloyd, nurse practitioner
- Brad Rohrs, realtor

==== Primary results ====
Republican primary results
Party	Candidate	Votes	%
Republican	Amie Hoeber	18,751	68.1
Republican	Lisa Lloyd	4,884	17.7
Republican	Kurt Elsasser	2,390	8.7
Republican	Brad Rohrs	1,528	5.5
Total votes		27,373	100.0

=== Endorsements ===
Roger Manno

Organizations

- IBEW Local Union 307
- Maryland State and DC AFL-CIO
- National Nurses United
- Our Revolution
- SEIU Local 500
- UFCW Local 1994
- Working Families Party
Aruna Miller

U.S. senators

- Kirsten Gillibrand (D-New York)

U.S. representatives

- Ami Bera (D-CA-07)
- Pramila Jayapal (D-WA-07)
- Ro Khanna (D-CA-17)
- Raja Krishnamoorthi (D-IL-08)

State-level officials

- Kathleen Kennedy Townsend, former lieutenant governor of Maryland

State legislators

- Erek Barron, state delegate (Prince George's County)
- Kumar Barve, state delegate (Montgomery County)
- Michael E. Busch, state delegate (Anne Arundel County) and speaker of the Maryland House of Delegates
- Kathleen M. Dumais, state delegate (Montgomery County)
- David Fraser-Hidalgo, state delegate (Montgomery County)
- Tawanna P. Gaines, state delegate (Prince George's County)
- Shelly Hettleman, state delegate (Baltimore County)
- Terri L. Hill, state delegate (Howard County)
- Sheila Hixson, state delegate (Montgomery County)
- Carolyn J. B. Howard, state delegate (Prince George's County)
- Adrienne A. Jones, state delegate (Baltimore County) and speaker pro tempore of the Maryland House of Delegates

Organizations

- 314 Action
- ASPIRE PAC
- EMILY's List
- End Citizens United
- National Education Association
- Sierra Club

=== General election ===
==== Predictions ====
Source	Ranking	As of
The Cook Political Report	Safe D	November 5, 2018
Inside Elections	Safe D	November 5, 2018
Sabato's Crystal Ball	Safe D	November 5, 2018
RCP	Safe D	November 5, 2018
Daily Kos	Safe D	November 5, 2018
538	Safe D	November 7, 2018
CNN	Safe D	October 31, 2018
Politico	Safe D	November 4, 2018

==== Debates ====
- Complete video of debate, October 23, 2018

==== Results ====
Maryland's 6th congressional district, 2018
Party	Candidate	Votes	%
Democratic	David Trone	163,346	59.0
Republican	Amie Hoeber	105,209	38.0
Libertarian	Kevin Caldwell	4,972	1.8
Green	George Gluck	3,275	1.2
n/a	Write-ins	282	0.1
Total votes		277,084	100.0
Democratic hold			

== District 7 ==
2018 Maryland's 7th congressional district election
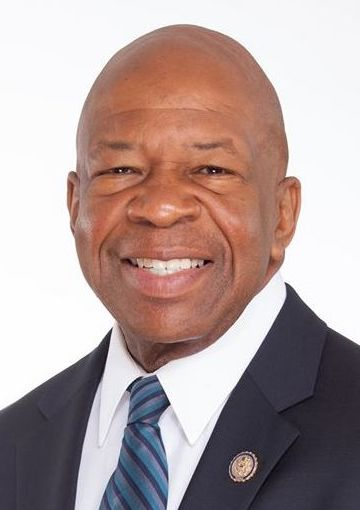

Nominee	Elijah Cummings	Richmond Davis
Party	Democratic	Republican
Popular vote	202,345	56,266
Percentage	76.4%	21.3%
- Precinct results Cummings: 40–50% 50–60% 60–70% 70–80% 80–90% >90% Davis: 40–50% 50–60% 60–70% No votes
U.S. Representative before election
Elijah Cummings
Democratic
Elected U.S. Representative
Elijah Cummings
Democratic

The incumbent was Elijah Cummings. He had represented the district since 1996. Cummings was re-elected with 76.4% of the vote in 2018.

=== Democratic primary ===
- Anthony Carter Sr.
- Elijah Cummings, incumbent representative
- John Moser
- Charles Smith
- Charles Stokes

==== Primary results ====
Democratic primary results
Party	Candidate	Votes	%
Democratic	Elijah Cummings (incumbent)	77,110	91.5
Democratic	Anthony Carter Sr.	2,143	2.5
Democratic	John Moser	2,134	2.5
Democratic	Charles Stokes	2,130	2.5
Democratic	Charles Smith	771	0.9
Total votes		84,288	100.0

=== Republican primary ===
- Ray Bly
- Richmond Davis, attorney
- Thomas Harris
- William Newton
- Michael Pearson

==== Primary results ====
Republican primary results
Party	Candidate	Votes	%
Republican	Richmond Davis	3,421	31.2
Republican	Michael Pearson	3,283	29.9
Republican	William Newton	2,451	22.3
Republican	Ray Bly	1,821	16.6
Total votes		10,976	100.0

=== General election ===
==== Predictions ====
Source	Ranking	As of
The Cook Political Report	Safe D	November 5, 2018
Inside Elections	Safe D	November 5, 2018
Sabato's Crystal Ball	Safe D	November 5, 2018
RCP	Safe D	November 5, 2018
Daily Kos	Safe D	November 5, 2018
538	Safe D	November 7, 2018
CNN	Safe D	October 31, 2018
Politico	Safe D	November 4, 2018

==== Results ====
Maryland's 7th congressional district, 2018
Party	Candidate	Votes	%
Democratic	Elijah Cummings (incumbent)	202,345	76.4
Republican	Richmond Davis	56,266	21.3
Libertarian	David Griggs	5,827	2.2
n/a	Write-ins	272	0.1
Total votes		264,710	100.0
Democratic hold			

== District 8 ==
2018 Maryland's 8th congressional district election
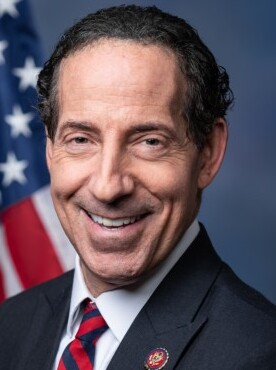

Nominee	Jamie Raskin	John Walsh
Party	Democratic	Republican
Popular vote	217,679	96,525
Percentage	68.2%	30.2%
- Precinct results Raskin: 40–50% 50–60% 60–70% 70–80% 80–90% >90% Walsh: 40–50% 50–60% 60–70% 70–80% No votes
U.S. Representative before election
Jamie Raskin
Democratic
Elected U.S. Representative
Jamie Raskin
Democratic

The incumbent was Democrat Jamie Raskin, who had represented the district since 2017. Raskin was elected with 61% of the vote in 2016.

=== Democratic primary ===
- Utam Paul
- Jamie Raskin, incumbent
- Summer Spring

==== Primary results ====
Democratic primary results
Party	Candidate	Votes	%
Democratic	Jamie Raskin (incumbent)	74,303	90.5
Democratic	Summer Spring	4,759	5.8
Democratic	Utam Paul	3,032	3.7
Total votes		82,094	100.0

=== Republican primary ===
- Bridgette Cooper
- John Walsh
- Victor Williams

==== Primary results ====
Republican primary results
Party	Candidate	Votes	%
Republican	John Walsh	8,686	45.1
Republican	Bridgette Cooper	5,995	31.2
Republican	Victor Williams	4,558	23.7
Total votes		19,239	100.0

=== General election ===
==== Predictions ====
Source	Ranking	As of
The Cook Political Report	Safe D	November 5, 2018
Inside Elections	Safe D	November 5, 2018
Sabato's Crystal Ball	Safe D	November 5, 2018
RCP	Safe D	November 5, 2018
Daily Kos	Safe D	November 5, 2018
538	Safe D	November 7, 2018
CNN	Safe D	October 31, 2018
Politico	Safe D	November 4, 2018

==== Results ====
Maryland's 8th congressional district, 2018
Party	Candidate	Votes	%
Democratic	Jamie Raskin (incumbent)	217,679	68.2
Republican	John Walsh	96,525	30.2
Libertarian	Jasen Wunder	4,853	1.5
n/a	Write-ins	273	0.1
Total votes		319,330	100.0
Democratic hold			
