= Dennis Hayes =

Dennis Hayes may refer to:

- Dennis Hayes (businessman) (born 1950), founder of Hayes Microcomputer Products
- Dennis Hayes (musician), American bass guitarist
- Dennis Hayes (professor) (born 1950), professor of education
- Dennis Courtland Hayes (born 1951), executive at the National Association for the Advancement of Colored People

== See also ==
- Denis Hayes (born 1944), environmental advocate and proponent of solar power
- Denis A. Hayes (1860–1917), American labor union leader
- Dennis K. Hays (born 1953), United States Ambassador to Suriname
