= OCE =

OCE refers to:

- Office of Congressional Ethics for the U.S. House of Representatives
- French Polynesia, ITU country code (for Établissements français d'Océanie)
- Oregon College of Education, former name (1939–1981) of Western Oregon University
