= Cheryl Johnson =

American government official (born 1960)

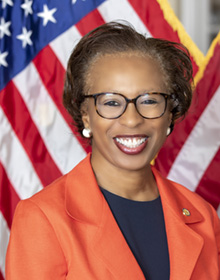
- Official portrait, 2020

36th Clerk of the United States House of Representatives
- In office February 26, 2019 – June 30, 2023
- Speaker: Nancy Pelosi; Kevin McCarthy
- Preceded by: Karen L. Haas
- Succeeded by: Kevin McCumber

Presiding Officer of the United States House of Representatives
- Acting; January 3, 2023 – January 7, 2023
- Preceded by: Nancy Pelosi (as Speaker)
- Succeeded by: Kevin McCarthy (as Speaker)

Personal details
- Born: Cheryl Lynn Johnson; May 8, 1960 (age 66) New Orleans, Louisiana, U.S.
- Party: Democratic
- Education: University of Iowa (BA); Howard University (JD)

Cheryl Lynn Johnson (born May 8, 1960) is an American government official who served as the 36th clerk of the United States House of Representatives from February 26, 2019, to June 30, 2023. Between January 3, 2023, and January 7, 2023, Johnson served as the acting presiding officer of the House while the election of a speaker for the 118th United States Congress was deadlocked until Kevin McCarthy was elected after 15 ballots.

== Early life and education ==
Johnson was born in New Orleans, Louisiana, to Austin Johnson and Cynthia Terry Davis.

Johnson graduated from the University of Iowa with a bachelor's degree in journalism and mass communication in 1980. She earned her J.D. degree from the Howard University School of Law in 1984. She is a graduate of the senior management program at the Harvard Kennedy School.

== Career ==
In Congress, Johnson served as the director and counsel of the United States House Committee on House Administration's Subcommittee on Libraries and Memorials, House Committee on Post Office, and Civil Service Subcommittee on Investigations. She worked with the Subcommittee chair, Bill Clay, to exercise oversight and legislative responsibility over the Library of Congress and the Smithsonian Institution.

Johnson served as the chief education and investigative counsel for the House Committee on Education and the Workforce. She was the principal policy advisor and spokesperson for the committee. She primarily focused on elementary and secondary education issues, juvenile justice, child nutrition, labor issues, and older Americans' employment and nutrition programs.

After nearly twenty years in the House of Representatives, Johnson went on to serve in the Smithsonian Institution's Office of Government Relations for ten years, serving one of those years as director.

=== Clerk of the U.S. House of Representatives ===
In late December 2018, Speaker-designate Nancy Pelosi named Johnson as her choice for the next Clerk of the U.S. House of Representatives, making her the second African American to serve in the post after Lorraine C. Miller. On February 25, 2019, Johnson was sworn in as the 36th Clerk and assumed the role on February 26, 2019. She was preceded by Karen L. Haas.

On January 3, 2023, pursuant to her duties as clerk, Johnson presided over the first session of the 118th United States Congress until January 7, 2023, making her the first African American woman and person of color to wield the gavel for the U.S. House of Representatives. After fourteen failed attempts by the House to elect a Speaker, her presiding role concluded when Representative Kevin McCarthy was elected the 55th Speaker of the House in the 15th ballot.

Johnson also served as Clerk during the 116th United States Congress (2019–2021) and 117th United States Congress (2021–2023). After her presiding role, she was renominated, this time, by McCarthy, to remain Clerk during the 118th United States Congress. In June 2023, she addressed the House to announce her resignation effective June 30, 2023, receiving a standing ovation from the representatives. She was succeeded by her deputy clerk, Kevin McCumber.

=== Board of the Office of Congressional Conduct ===
On June 23, 2025, Johnson was appointed to the Board of the Office of Congressional Conduct (OCC) after being nominated by House Democratic Leader Hakeem Jeffries, after consultation with Speaker of the House, Mike Johnson. The OCC is in charge of investigating any alleged violation of a "law, rule, regulation, or other standard of conduct" committed by a "Member, officer, or employee of the House". The OCC Board decides, after an OCC preliminary investigation and second-phase review, recommend to the House Committee on Ethics if further investigation is warranted or to dismiss the complaint.

== Personal life ==
Johnson lives in Chevy Chase, Maryland, with her husband, Clarence Ellison, and their son.

She is a member of the District of Columbia and the Louisiana bars. She serves on the board of the Nineteenth Street Baptist Church and the Faith and Politics Institute.

Government offices
Preceded by Karen L. Haas	36th Clerk of the United States House of Representatives; 2019–2023	Succeeded by Kevin McCumber
Political offices
Preceded by Nancy Pelosi as Speaker of the U.S. House of Representatives	Presiding Officer of the United States House of Representatives; 2023	Succeeded by Kevin McCarthy as Speaker of the U.S. House of Representatives
