= Bruce S. Gordon =

American businessperson

Bruce Gordon
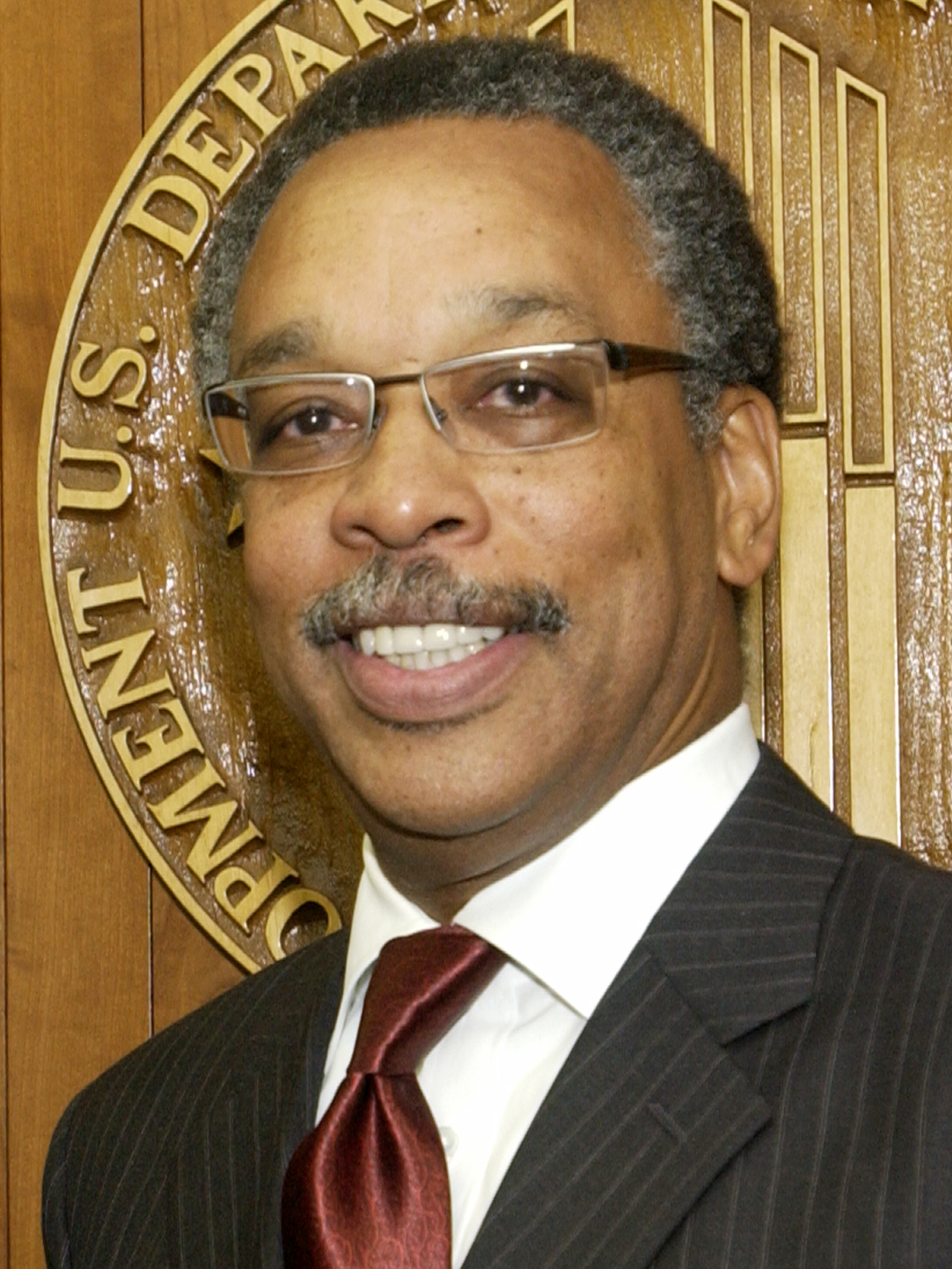

President and CEO of the NAACP
- In office 2005–2007
- Preceded by: Dennis Courtland Hayes (acting)
- Succeeded by: Dennis Courtland Hayes (acting)

Personal details
- Born: Bruce Scott Gordon; February 15, 1946 (age 80) Camden, New Jersey, U.S.
- Education: Gettysburg College (BA); Massachusetts Institute of Technology (MBA)

Bruce Scott Gordon (born February 15, 1946) is an American business executive who spent most of his career with Verizon and currently serves as a corporate director of CBS, Northrop Grumman, and Tyco International. He was selected in June 2005 to head the NAACP, a major American civil rights organization. Gordon served in that position until March 2007.

== Early life ==
Born in Camden, New Jersey, Gordon's parents were both active in the civil rights movement. A 1968 graduate of Gettysburg College, where he was a member of Tau Kappa Epsilon fraternity, and a 1988 Master's degree in Management (M.B.A.) graduate of the Sloan Fellows program of the MIT Sloan School of Management.

== Career ==
Gordon's professional career began at Bell of Pennsylvania, where he rose in corporate management to become the Head of the Retail Markets Division of Verizon upon his retirement in December 2003. Other Verizon executives have credited him with helping to promote diversity and a corporate culture based on customer service at the telecom company.

The American Advertising Federation inducted him into the Advertising Hall of Fame, the industry's most prestigious honor, in March 2007. Ebony magazine named him one of its "100 Most Influential Black Americans and Organization Leaders" in May 2006. He was ranked #6 on Fortune magazine's list of the "50 Most Powerful Black Executives" in July 2002. Black Enterprise magazine named him executive of the year in 1998.

Gordon is a member of the boards of CBS Corporation, Northrop Grumman Corporation, and Tyco International, Ltd., where he serves as lead director. He is a diversity consultant to Fortune 500 companies. Gordon is a trustee of U.S. Fund for UNICEF, National Underground Railroad Freedom Center, and Newport Festivals Foundation; a member of the Advisory Boards for New York Urban League, and Bishop John T. Walker School for Boys; and a member of the Executive Leadership Council. He previously served on the boards of Southern Company, Office Depot, Best Foods, Infinity Broadcasting and Bartech Group; previously chaired the Chancellor's Advisory Board on Student Motivation in the New York Public School System; was a trustee of Alvin Ailey American Dance Theater Foundation, The Barnes Foundation, Gettysburg College and Lincoln Center.

== NAACP ==
Gordon's selection as NAACP president on 25 June 2005 was widely regarded as unusual — most of the organization's past presidents have been prominent figures in politics, religion, or the civil rights movement before holding the office. The only candidate seriously considered by the organization's board, he was approved by a unanimous vote and was confirmed at the July 2005 NAACP convention. He succeeded Kweisi Mfume, who resigned his post as NAACP president in late 2004.

President George W. Bush made his first appearance at the NAACP on July 20, 2006, half-way through his second term. After having declined to address the organization for most of his presidency, it was Gordon's "moderate" political views that led Bush to acquiesce to the appearance, according to White House spokesman Tony Snow.

Citing strain with the board, Gordon resigned in March 2007. He stated "I did not step into the role to be a caretaker, to be dictated to," Gordon said. "I stepped into the role to understand as best I could the needs of the African American community and then to propose strategies and policies and programs and practices that could improve conditions for African Americans…. The things I had in mind were not consistent with what some — unfortunately, too many — on the board had in mind."

Non-profit organization positions
Preceded by Dennis Courtland Hayes; Acting	President and CEO of the National Association for the Advancement of Colored People; 2005–2007	Succeeded by Dennis Courtland Hayes; Acting
