= Office of Congressional Conduct =

Nonpartisan entity in the United States

The Office of Congressional Conduct (OCC), formerly called the Office of Congressional Ethics (OCE), established by the U.S. House of Representatives in March 2008, is a nonpartisan, independent entity charged with reviewing allegations of misconduct against members of the House of Representatives and their staff and, when appropriate, referring matters to the United States House Committee on Ethics.

== Overview ==
The OCC's mission is "to assist the House in upholding high standards of ethical conduct for its Members, officers, and staff and, in so doing, to serve the American people"; within that framework it strives to foster transparency by keeping the public informed of its activities. With its online presence, it aims to “give the public a 'window' into ethics enforcement in the United States House of Representatives.” The office is governed by an eight-person Board of Directors, composed of members who are private citizens and cannot serve as members of Congress, or work for the federal government.

The OCC lacks subpoena power and must complete each review in a relatively short period of time—approximately three months at most. The OCC review process requires approval of the board at each step. In order to open a preliminary review, lasting no longer than 30 days, there must be "reasonable cause to believe allegations," according to the OCC. In order to proceed to a second phase, or further review, there must be "probable cause to believe allegations." The second phase must be completed within 45 days, with the possibility of a 14-day extension. Following completion of the second-phase review, the OCE board votes to refer a matter to the House Ethics Committee with a recommendation for or against further review by the committee. The recommendation comes in the form of a report which must be released to the public, unless the OCE recommendation was against further review.

Consequently, the OCE has published nearly two dozen reports on members believed to have violated House rules—leading to cheers from government watchdog groups and to calls by some in Congress for gutting the office, which requires reauthorization at the beginning of each new Congress. "The extent and level of ethics scrutiny the OCE has brought is unprecedented in the House," according to The Hill newspaper, in a Sept. 8, 2010 article on the future of the office.

At least 20 of the OCE's referrals on sitting members of the House of Representatives were published on its website in its first Congressional session of operation—a demonstration, according to The Washington Post, that the office "has taken its mission seriously."

Although the office does not have subpoena power, it has played a significant role in 2010 investigations concerning alleged ethics violations by Rep. Charlie Rangel (D-N.Y.) and Rep. Maxine Waters (D-Calif.), and former Rep. Nathan Deal (R-Ga.)

== History ==
The OCE was created by House Resolution 895 of the 110th United States Congress in March 2008, in the wake of across-the-board Democratic victories in the 2006 elections. It was created under the leadership of then-Speaker of the U.S. House of Representatives Nancy Pelosi as part of her effort to clean up what she called the "culture of corruption" in official Washington, which had garnered so much attention in the preceding congressional sessions. According to OCE Communications Director Jon Steinman, in a statement in 2010, "keeping the public informed is a paramount responsibility for the OCE" and "providing information to the public, improving transparency, is a central element of the OCE's mission.

The office's launch and first two years were led by Leo Wise, who prior to joining the OCE, earned top honors at the United States Department of Justice where he was a member of the Enron task force that successfully prosecuted Ken Lay and Jeffrey Skilling and the tobacco litigation team that successfully prosecuted the civil racketeering case against the cigarette industry. He joined the United States Department of Justice through the prestigious Attorney General's Honors Program after graduating from Harvard Law School. Wise is a graduate of the Johns Hopkins University and the Paul H. Nitze School of Advanced International Studies. He is also an officer in the United States Navy Reserve.

The OCE opened dozens of reviews, based on publicly available information, submissions from the public, press accounts and other sources of information. This included the multiple ethical and criminal violations stemming from, among others, disgraced lobbyist Jack Abramoff, and former representatives Duke Cunningham, Tom DeLay, Bob Ney, Mark Foley and William J. Jefferson.

Wise announced in October 2010 that he was leaving the OCE to join the office of the United States Attorney for the District of Maryland following what OCE Chairman David Skaggs termed an "extraordinary job 'standing up' and managing OCE operations during its first two years."

Calls to eliminate the office have come from both Republicans and Democrats in Congress. The New York Times Editorial Board wrote in 2010 that "Grumblers on both sides want to gut the ethics office... because it has been fulfilling its mission to put life into the lawmakers' own stultified ethics process, to penetrate the murk of misbehavior and keep the public better informed." Given these threats, a number of outside government groups, watchdogs and editorial writers campaigned that year to ensure the survival of the OCE into another session of Congress. They sent letters supporting the OCE to then-Speaker Nancy Pelosi and then-House Minority Leader John Boehner. The Sunlight Foundation stated at the time: "More than anything else the Office of Congressional Ethics has helped to reveal to the public the patent absurdity of the self-policing oversight that members provide through the House Ethics Committee."

On January 2, 2017, one day before the 115th United States Congress was scheduled to convene for its first session, House Republicans held a "surprise vote" to effectively place the OCE under direct control of the House Ethics Committee, therefore making any future review of potential violations of criminal law by members of Congress subject to approval following referral to the Ethics Committee or an appropriate federal law enforcement agency. These new rules also bar the OCE from independently releasing statements publicly on pending or completed investigations. This move was immediately met with criticism by Democratic leaders in both the House and the Senate, with House Minority Leader Nancy Pelosi, claiming that "ethics are the first casualty of the new Republican Congress", and Senate Minority Leader Chuck Schumer saying that the GOP had failed to keep their promise to "drain the swamp", referring to the frequent use of the phrase by President-elect Donald Trump and other Republican leaders during the 2015 campaign.

The 119–74 vote reflected the frustration of many lawmakers who questioned the non-partisanship of the OCE. In a statement, Representative Bob Goodlatte (R-Va.) defended pushing the rules amendment because it "builds upon and strengthens the existing Office of Congressional Ethics by maintaining its primary area of focus of accepting and reviewing complaints from the public and referring them, if appropriate, to the Committee on Ethics."

House Republicans reversed their plan to gut the OCE less than 24 hours after the initial vote, under bipartisan pressure from Representatives of both parties, their constituents and the President-elect, Donald Trump. In addition to negative Trump tweets, criticism was widespread including from Judicial Watch, the Project on Government Oversight, former Representative Bob Ney, who was convicted of receiving bribes, and Jack Abramoff, the lobbyist who provided such bribes.

After regaining a majority in the House of Representatives during the 118th United States Congress, House Republicans announced plans to change OCE rules, with the set of changes including "reinstat[ing] two four-year term limits for board members, which haven’t been enforced since 2014. It also could require the board to hire the office’s staff for the entire session within 30 calendar days of the rules package passing. Any new hires would require the approval of at least four board members." According to Forbes, "the term limits would immediately remove three of the four Democratic members from the office’s board, but none of the four Republican board members would be dismissed. (Although members of each party chose the board’s members, they are supposed to perform their duties independently of their affiliation.) It could be difficult to fill the newly vacated spots within 30 days, which might leave the board with just five members. That would, in turn, make it harder to hire new employees, as four votes would be required to extend a job offer. The change also would leave Republican-appointed members with almost total control of staffing decisions. Even at full strength, hiring personnel sometimes take months." The Guardian stated that "though seemingly innocuous, the changes appear to have been drafted to strike at the principal vulnerabilities of OCE and defang its investigative powers for at least the next two years." Various government watchdog groups, like Campaign Legal Center, Citizens for Responsibility and Ethics in Washington (CREW) and Accountable.US, pushed back on the GOP move.

House Republicans renamed it the Office of Congressional Conduct in 2025.

== Board of directors ==
The membership as of August 2025:

- Karen L. Haas, former House Clerk and former Republican congressional staffer
- Bill Luther, former Democratic congressman from Minnesota
- Lorraine C. Miller, former House Clerk
- Leon Acton Westmoreland, former Republican congressman from Georgia
- Cheryl Johnson, former House Clerk
- Jody Hice, former Republican congressman from Georgia

Former board members include:

- Mike Barnes, chair former Democratic congressman from Maryland
- Paul Vinovich, co-chair and former Republican congressional staffer
- David Skaggs, co-chair and former Democratic congressman
- Belinda Pinckney, retired United States Army brigadier general
- Karan English, former Democratic congresswoman
- Robert Hurt
