= Lia Epperson =

American civil rights lawyer and legal scholar

Lia Beth Epperson
- Born: 1971 or 72; Pittsburgh, Pennsylvania
- Other name: Lia Epperson Jealous
- Citizenship: American
- Occupation: Professor of Law
- Spouse: Ben Jealous (m. 2002; div. 2015)
- Children: 2
- Parent(s): David E. Epperson and Cecelia T. Epperson
- Relatives: Sharon Epperson (sister); Christopher John Farley (brother-in-law)

Academic background
- Education: Harvard University, B.A.; Stanford Law School, J.D.

Academic work
- Discipline: Legal scholar
- Institutions: Santa Clara University School of Law (2005-2010); University of Maryland Francis King Carey School of Law (2009-2010); American University Washington College of Law (2010-present)
- Main interests: Civil rights, education law, constitutional law, public law

Lia Beth Epperson (born 1971 or 1972) is an American civil rights lawyer and professor of law at American University Washington College of Law. She previously served as the senior associate dean for faculty and academic affairs at the law school. Epperson served as director for education litigation and policy at the NAACP Legal Defense and Educational Fund from 2001 to 2005. Her scholarship focuses primarily on federal courts and educational policies with regard to race. Epperson was a senior fellow at the Center for American Progress and an Institute of Advanced Studies Fellow at Collegium de Lyon. Epperson has authored multiple amicus briefs for the Supreme Court of the United States related to affirmative action and education law.

== Early life and education ==
Epperson grew up in Pittsburgh, Pennsylvania, alongside sister Sharon Epperson. Epperson's father, Dr. David E. Epperson, was the dean of the School of Social Work at the University of Pittsburgh for nearly 30 years and was the first African-American dean at the school. Her mother was a first-grade teacher at Lincoln Elementary School in Pittsburgh.

Epperson attended Harvard University, where she received a Bachelor of Arts in sociology and graduated magna cum laude. While at Harvard, Epperson joined Alpha Kappa Alpha, the first historically African-American Greek-lettered sorority, of which her sister, Sharon, was also a member. In her senior year, Epperson received the Bayard Rustin Fellowship. She later attended Stanford University School of Law, receiving a juris doctor in 1998. At Stanford, Epperson worked as an editor of the Stanford Law Review and the Stanford Law and Policy Review. Prior to graduating, Epperson was a summer associate at the Children's Defense Fund. Epperson was admitted to the California State Bar on May 5, 1999, although her license is no longer active in the state.

== Career ==
After graduating from Stanford Law School, Epperson worked as a law clerk for Timothy K. Lewis of the United States Court of Appeals for the Third Circuit. Epperson and Lewis later served together as board members for The Constitution Project. In 1991, Epperson began working as an associate at Morrison & Foerster in Palo Alto, California. Epperson litigated commercial and civil rights. Additionally, she was a board member for Big Brothers Big Sisters of San Francisco and the Peninsula. From 2001 to 2005, Epperson served as the director of education litigation and policy at the NAACP Legal Defense and Educational Fund.

Epperson began her career in academics in 2005, serving as an associate professor at Santa Clara University School of Law, where she taught constitutional law until 2010. While at Santa Clara, Epperson served on the Board Nominating Committee of the American Civil Liberties Union of Northern California and the Justice Fund Honorary Committee of the Legal Aid Society-Employment Law Center. Epperson was a senior fellow at the Center for American Progress from 2008 to 2010, conducting research that focused on federal civil rights enforcement of educational policies and practices. From 2009 to 2010, Epperson also worked as a visiting professor at the University of Maryland Francis King Carey School of Law. In 2010, Epperson began working at American University Washington College of Law. She previously served as director of the Doctor of Juridical Science Program. In addition, Epperson served as senior associate dean of faculty and academic affairs at the school. Epperson received the school's Excellence in Teaching Award in February 2022.

On several occasions, Epperson has been a panelist and correspondent on C-SPAN, discussing the Supreme Court case Ricci v. DeStefano as well as public school integration.

As of January 2025, Epperson was a member-at-large, representing Washington, D.C., for the national board of the American Civil Liberties Union.

== Publications ==
=== Books ===
- Racial Discrimination in Education The Child: An Encyclopedic Companion (Richard A. Shweder ed., U. Chi. Press 2009).
- The Rehnquist Court, the Resurrection of Plessy and the Elusive Definition of “Societal Discrimination" Awakening From the Dream: Pursuing Civil Rights in a Conservative Era (Denise C. Morgan et al. eds, Carolina Acad. Press 2006).
- Biography of Sadie Tanner Mossell Alexander African American Lives (Henry Louis Gates & Evelyn Brooks Higginbotham eds., Oxford U. Press 2004).

=== Articles ===
- Resisting Retreat: A Trench-Level View of the Struggle for Equity in Educational Opportunity in the Post-Brown Era, 66 U. Pitt. L. Rev. 131 (2005).
- True Integration: Advancing Brown's Goal of Educational Equity in the Wake of Grutter, 67 U. Pitt. L. Rev. 175 (2005-2006).
- Undercover Power: Examining the Role of the Executive Branch in Determining the Meaning and Scope of School Integration Jurisprudence, 10 Berkeley J. Afr.-Am. L. & Pol'y 146 (2008).
- Equality Dissonance, 7 Stan. J. Civ. Rights & Civ. Liberties 101 (2011).
- New Legal Perspectives: Implications for Diversity in the Post-Grutter Era Diversity in American Higher Education: Toward a More Comprehensive Approach (Lisa M. Stulberg & Sharon L. Weinberg, eds., Routledge Press 2011).
- Legislating Inclusion, 6 Harv. L. & Pol. Rev. 801 (2012).
- Bringing the Market to Students? School Choice and Vocational Education in the 21st Century, 87 Notre Dame L. Rev. 1861 (2012).
- The Promise and Pitfalls of Empiricism in Educational Equality Jurisprudence, 48 Wake Forest. L. Rev. 101 (forthcoming 2013).
- Brown's Dream Deferred: Lessons on Democracy and Identity from Cooper v. Aaron to the School-to-Prison Pipeline, 49 Wake Forest L. Rev. 687 (2014).
- Beware the Unintended Consequences: Government Transparency, Racial Data Collection, and Minority Rights in the United States and Abroad, Revue Internationale des Gouvernements Ouverts (2016).

=== Briefs ===
- Brief for the NAACP Legal Defense and Educational Fund, Inc. and the American Civil Liberties Union as Amici Curiae in Support of Respondents, Grutter v. Bollinger, 5 Rutgers Race & L. Rev. 149 (2003).

== Personal life ==
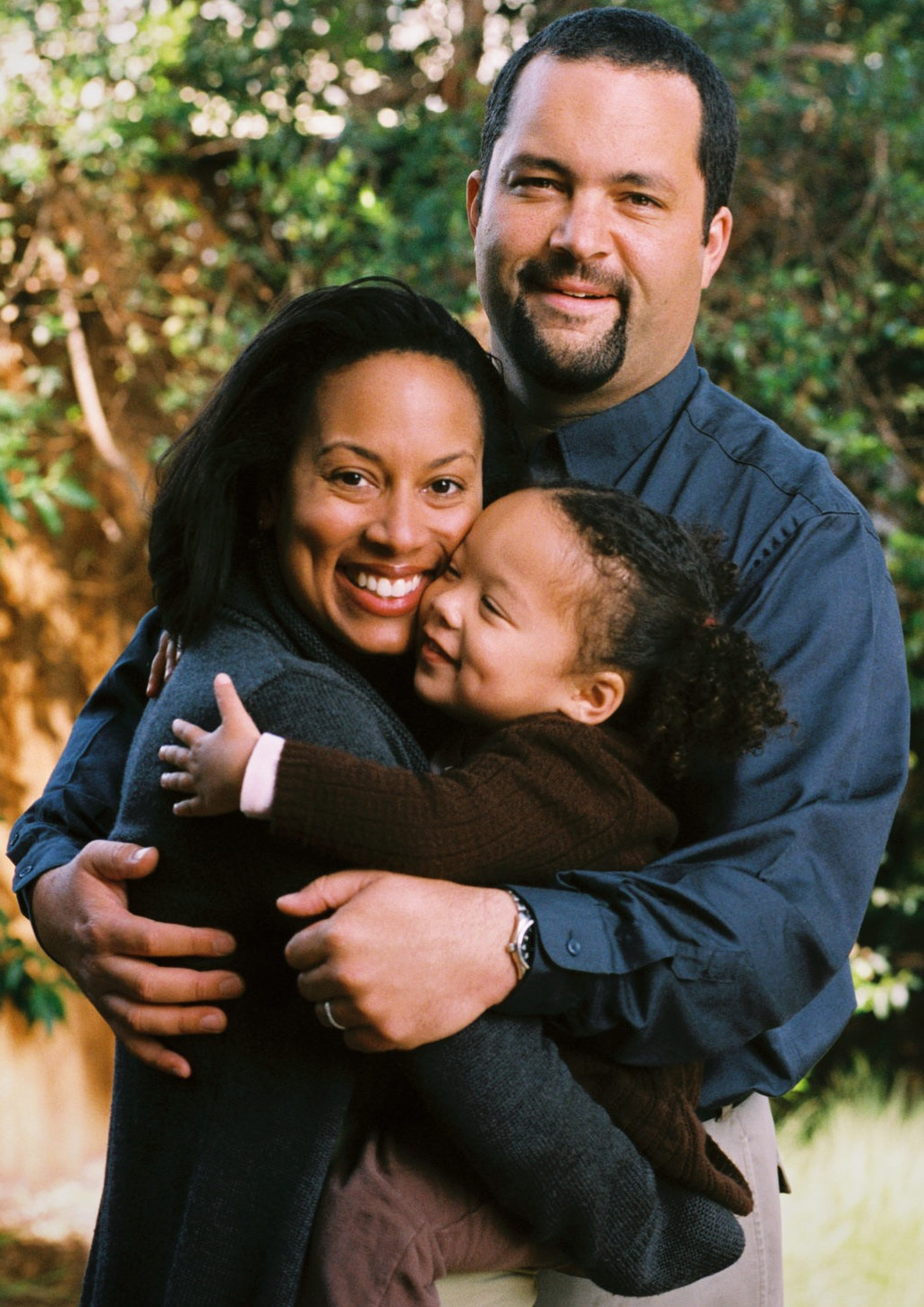
Epperson, Jealous, and their child in 2008

Epperson married Benjamin Jealous, the former president and chief executive officer of the National Association for the Advancement of Colored People (NAACP), in July 2002. Epperson and Jealous met in 1993, when Epperson replaced Jealous as the intern at the New York national office of the NAACP Legal Defense and Educational Fund. Epperson and Jealous have two children together. The couple divorced in 2015. Epperson and Jealous remain amicable, and co-parent their two children. Epperson is the sister of CNBC correspondent Sharon Epperson.

== Honors and awards ==
In 2013, she was the Honorary Chair for the Women in NAACP program at the NAACP National Convention.

== See also ==
- NAACP Legal Defense and Education Fund
