= Kevin McCumber =

American government official (born 1979)

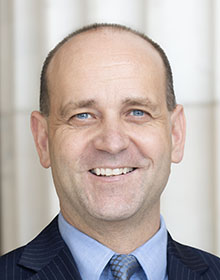
- Official portrait, 2024

37th Clerk of the United States House of Representatives
- Incumbent
- Assumed office July 1, 2023; Acting: July 1, 2023 – January 3, 2025
- Speaker: Kevin McCarthy; Mike Johnson
- Preceded by: Cheryl Johnson

Personal details
- Born: 1979 (age 46–47)
- Education: University of Colorado Denver (BA)

Kevin F. McCumber (born 1979) is an American government official who has served as the 37th clerk of the United States House of Representatives since 2025. He previously served as acting clerk from 2023 to 2025, being appointed by Kevin McCarthy following the resignation of Cheryl Johnson.

== Early life and education ==
McCumber grew up in Germantown Hills, Illinois. He studied political science at the University of Colorado Denver.

== Career ==
McCumber worked as a House page in 1996. He worked for the House clerk again from 2000 to 2006 in various roles. He returned in 2012, and was appointed as deputy clerk in 2021. Following Cheryl Johnson's resignation on June 30, 2023, he was appointed as acting Clerk of the United States House of Representatives by Kevin McCarthy. He remained as acting clerk under Speaker Mike Johnson for the duration of the 118th Congress and was elected clerk at the beginning of the 119th Congress.

== Personal life ==
McCumber lives in Alexandria, Virginia.

Government offices
Preceded by Cheryl Johnson	Clerk of the United States House of Representatives; 2023–present	Incumbent
