= Cornell William Brooks =

American activist and lawyer

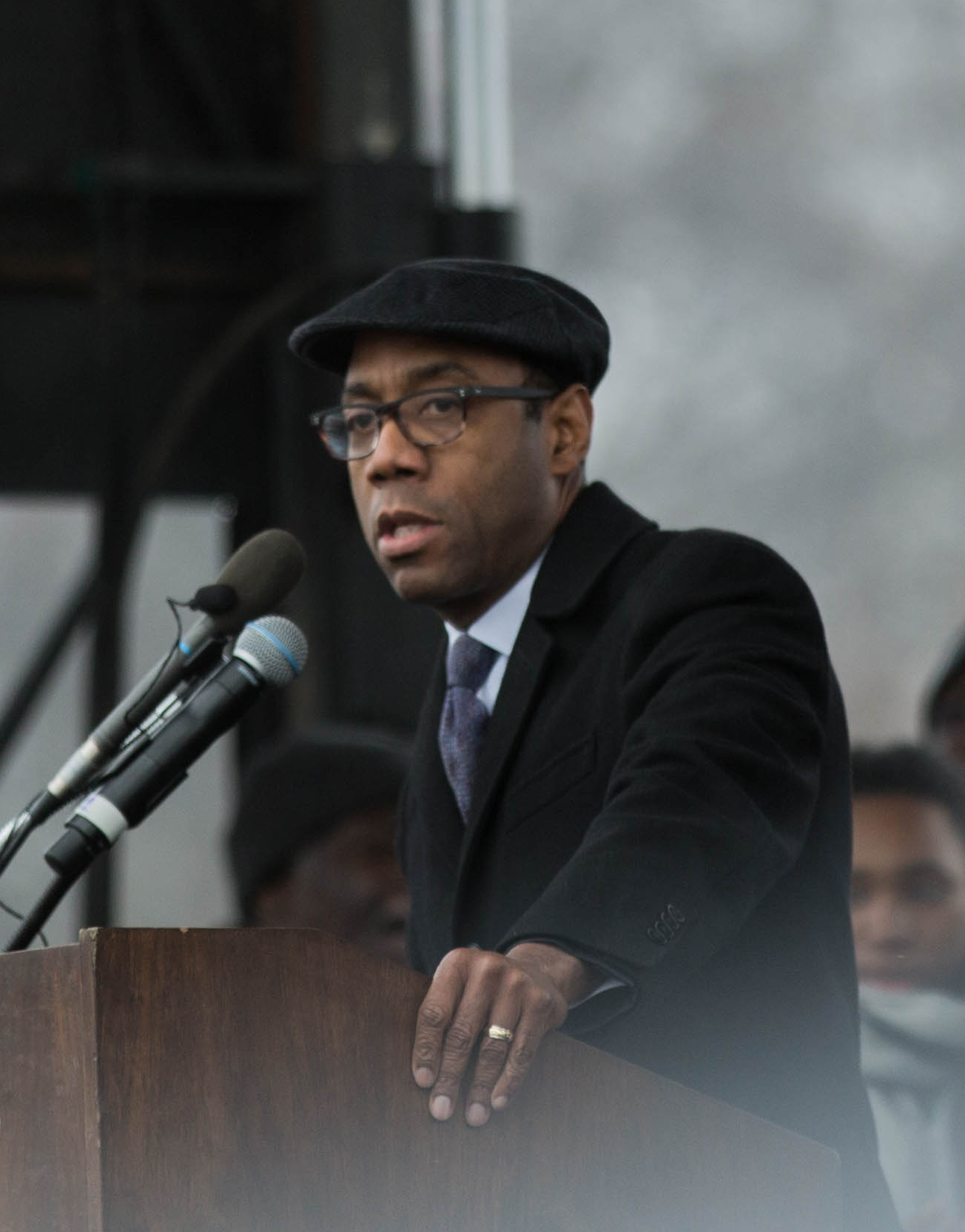
- Brooks in 2017

President and CEO of the NAACP
- In office May 2014 – June 2017
- Preceded by: Lorraine Miller (acting)
- Succeeded by: Derrick Johnson

Personal details
- Born: 1961 (age 64–65) El Paso, Texas, U.S.
- Education: Jackson State University (BA); Boston University (MDiv); Yale University (JD)

Cornell William Brooks (born 1961) is an American lawyer and activist. He was chosen to be the president of the National Association for the Advancement of Colored People (NAACP) in May 2014. He previously served as president of the New Jersey Institute for Social Justice in Newark, New Jersey, and as executive director of the Fair Housing Council of Greater Washington.

Brooks was formerly senior counsel with the Federal Communications Commission (FCC), directing the FCC's Office of Communication Business Opportunities. He also served as a trial attorney with the Lawyers' Committee for Civil Rights Under Law and ran as the Democratic nominee for U.S. Congress for the 10th District of Virginia in 1998. Brooks has served on the transition team for two New Jersey governors.

== Early life and education ==
Brooks was born in El Paso, Texas, in 1961. He grew up in Georgetown, South Carolina, and is a graduate of Head Start. Brooks attended Jackson State University, where he received a B.A. degree in political science with honors. He subsequently earned his Master of Divinity, with a concentration in social ethics and systematic theology, at the Boston University School of Theology. While studying as a Martin Luther King Scholar, Brooks was awarded both the Oxnam-Leibman Fellowship for outstanding scholarship and promoting racial harmony, and the Jefferson Fellowship for outstanding scholarship and excellence in preaching. He also received a J.D. degree from Yale Law School, where he was a senior editor of the Yale Law Journal and member of the Yale Law & Policy Review.

== Career ==
Brooks began his career serving a judicial clerkship with Chief Judge Sam J. Ervin, III, on the U.S. Court of Appeals for the Fourth Circuit. In Washington, DC, he directed the FCC's Office of Communication Business Opportunities and served as the executive director of the Fair Housing Council of Greater Washington. His work continued as a trial attorney with the Lawyers' Committee for Civil Rights Under Law and the U.S. Department of Justice, where he secured one of the largest government settlements for victims of housing discrimination based on testing, and filed the government's first lawsuit against a nursing home alleging housing discrimination based on race.

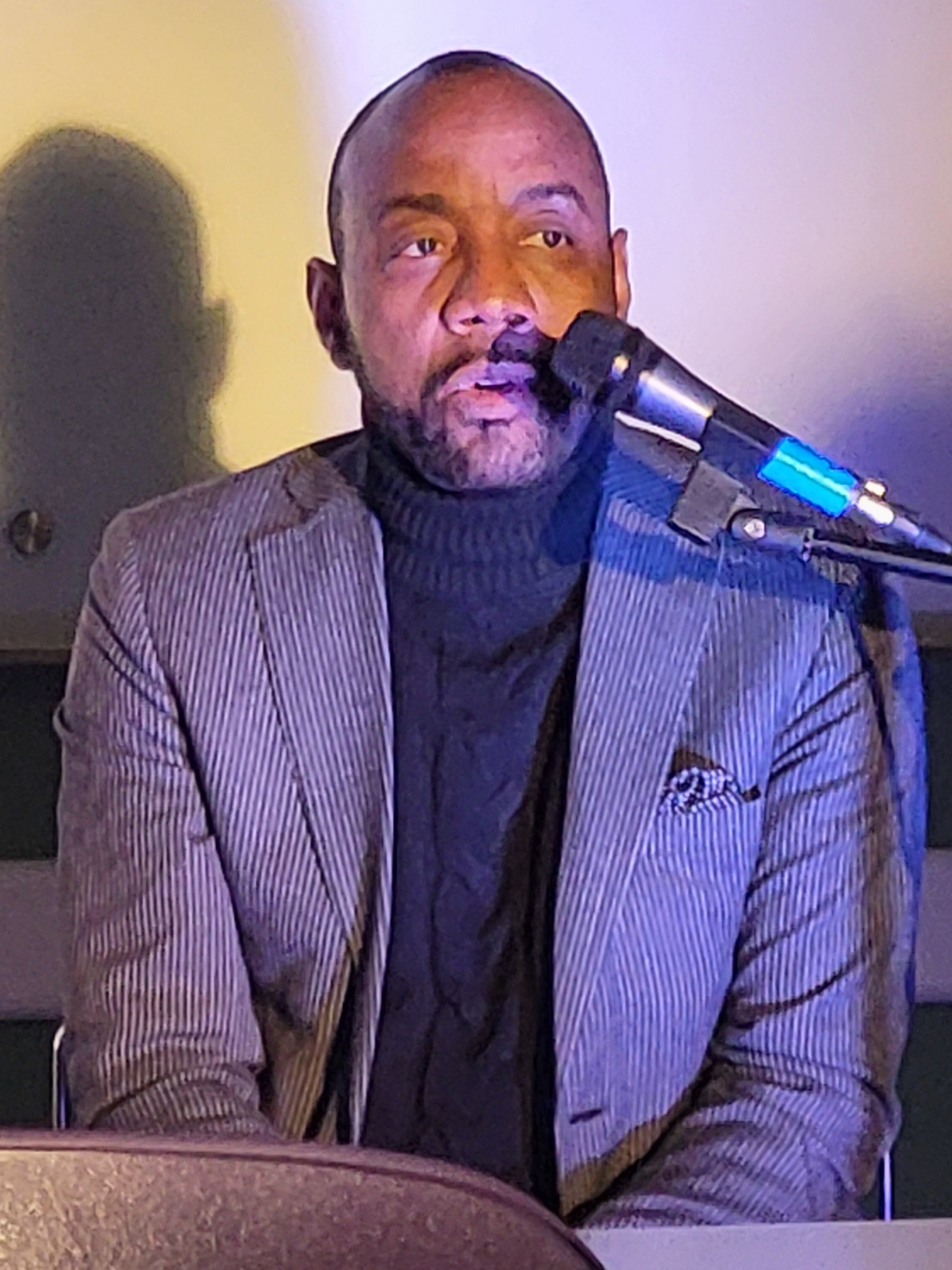
Brooks speaking at Binghamton University in 2022

Brooks's grandfather, the Rev. James Edmund Prioleau, ran for Congress in the 1940s as a Progressive Democrat in a symbolic effort to help increase voter registration among blacks and recruit NAACP members. Brooks was the Democratic nominee for U.S. Congress for the 10th District of Virginia in 1998.

He was the president and CEO of Newark-based New Jersey Institute for Social Justice prior to taking the helm of the NAACP. Following his tenure with the NAACP, Brooks has held a variety of appointments in higher education, including visiting professor of social ethics, law, & justice movements at Boston University, visiting fellow and director of the Campaigns and Advocacy Program at the Institute of Politics at the Harvard Kennedy School, and a senior fellow at the New York University School of Law. He is a regular contributor on CNN. In 2012, Brooks was elected to the Common Cause National Governing Board.

As of August 2018, Brooks is Professor of the Practice of Public Leadership and Social Justice at Harvard Kennedy School.

== NAACP leadership ==
=== Election ===
The executive board of the NAACP elected Brooks as the next chief executive on May 16, 2014, by a large majority. His appointment followed a period of turmoil for the organization, which had a severe budget shortfall and laid off workers only months before Brooks' election. Furthermore, even though branches are autonomous from the main organization, the national office received scrutiny about fundraising after the Los Angeles branch awarded Donald Sterling, the Los Angeles Clippers owner who was banned from the NBA after racist remarks, with a lifetime achievement award.

Brooks led the NAACP during a period of national turmoil through a three-pronged action plan of polls, protest, and policy. During the NAACP's 2014 convention, where Vice President Joe Biden addressed delegates about voter suppression, Brooks called for an NAACP "one million members strong". Near his exit youth leaders protested at the National Convention in 2016, stating "We are tired. We want accountability." "Youth leaders want its demands heard by national NAACP president Cornell William Brooks and the board."

=== Direct action and civil disobedience ===
In October 2014, Brooks began a Justice Tour, starting in his birthplace, El Paso, Texas. The bus tour had a goal to encourage people to vote and discuss social justice issues in their community. He also led a 7-day "Journey for Justice" through Missouri from the Canfield Green Apartments, where unarmed 18-year-old Michael Brown was shot and killed by a Ferguson police officer, to Jefferson City in 2014. The march met ice storms, bitter cold, and racist taunts. Brooks was heckled down by St. Louis activists about the organization lack of youth participation at a major "Ferguson October" rally. One woman is quoted as saying, "I had my back turned while that NAACP guy was speaking", explaining the divide between historic black civil rights organizations and the new Black Lives Matter movement taking shape. In Rosebud, Missouri, a "display of fried chicken, a melon and a 40-ounce beer bottle had been placed in the street." The 134-mile march culminated with a protest at the state Capitol Building. The agitation and advocacy in Missouri contributed to the Ferguson Police Department being held accountable by the Department of Justice using the Racial Profiling Law that the NAACP passed.

In the summer of 2015, the NAACP took the Journey for Justice millions of steps further. NAACP staff, volunteers, and allies marched 1,002 miles from Selma, AL to Washington, DC to demonstrate the urgency of voting rights and police reform. America's Journey for Justice – and the thousands who marched by day and slept in synagogues and church halls by night – worked to consolidate support among progressive organizations to advance voting rights legislation in the House and the Senate.

The NAACP led a coalition of nearly 300 grassroots organizations representing thirty million members in mass rallies and protests at the Capitol in the spring of 2016 to call for restoration of the Voting Rights Act and a fully seated Supreme Court. The Nation magazine touted the demonstration, with its 1,400 arrests, "The Most Important Protest of the 2016 Election".

In January 2017, the NAACP stood against the Trump administration with the sit-in opposing the nomination of Jeff Sessions. The NAACP organized a sit-in at Senator Sessions' Alabama office, turning his workplace into a digital and broadcast platform to teach the country about the evils of voter suppression. Brooks was arrested alongside five other NAACP activists in the first highly visible act of civil disobedience against the Trump administration. This sit-in energized other nomination fights and flooded Senate phone lines. On January 11, 2018, Brooks was one of four opposition voices asked to testify before the U.S. Senate Judiciary Committee at Sessions' confirmation hearing.

=== Legislative advocacy ===
In the second decade of the 21st century, criminal justice reform emerged as a priority for the NAACP and for the nation. The NAACP successfully advocated for the Missouri Municipal Fine Law after the death of Michael Brown, as well as the federal racial profiling guidance during the Obama administration. To combat the culture of mass incarceration, NAACP staff and members successfully pushed for more Ban-the-Box laws in states and municipalities across the country. Another legislative priority for the NAACP under Brooks' leadership was the passage of the Every Student Succeeds Act (ESSA).

=== Litigation ===
Under Brooks' leadership, the NAACP Legal Department achieved eleven major legal victories against voter suppression within the span of about a year. The NAACP Texas State Conference saved 608,470 votes with a victorious decision from the U.S. Court of Appeals for the Fifth Circuit. The NAACP North Carolina State Conference saved nearly five percent of the electorate when the U.S. Court of Appeals for the Fourth Circuit ruled that the state legislature had enacted discriminatory voting laws that intentionally targeted and disenfranchised black voters. And, just days before Election Day, the NAACP saved nearly 4,500 voters from being purged from the North Carolina rolls.

After children were poisoned with lead in Flint, MI, the NAACP took to the streets and the courts, engaging in direct action and filing a federal lawsuit against Michigan and its governor on behalf of the residents and businesses in Flint.

=== Select news coverage ===
Brooks' NAACP tenure saw a rise in the association's presence in print, on television, and on social media. Brooks became a frequent guest on broadcast news shows like CNN's The Situation Room with Wolf Blitzer and Out Front with Erin Burnett.

The Nation termed the NAACP's Democracy Awakening protest, "The Most Important Protest of the 2016 Election".

Brooks was praised for how he handled allegations that Rachel Dolezal, former president of the NAACP's Spokane, WA chapter, was a white woman who was telling people she was Black. In a The Wall Street Journal article on the NAACP's treatment of the controversy, Anthony Johndrow, co-founder and CEO of Reputation Economy Advisors, said: "I cannot think of an organization that has done a better job of using the attention that comes from a crisis to emphasize a core message 'to ensure the political, educational, social, and economic equality of rights of all persons.' For an organization that has largely been out of the public eye for some time, it is surprising how articulate and focused the NAACP is on both its civil and human rights mission and its intersection with the far more weighty issues of the day ... Meanwhile, for Cornell William Brooks to be able to clearly and succinctly say 'our focus must be on issues not individuals' is far better than the typical corporate dodge and a forceful shift to what we all should be focusing on instead of this story."

=== Departure ===
On May 19, 2017, the national board of the NAACP voted to dismiss Brooks from his position as president and CEO, explaining the move was part of a "systemwide refresh". In discussing the decision, NAACP Board Chairman Leon Russell said the change was made to ensure the organization would be better positioned to contest the "onslaught of civil rights assaults and rollbacks" the board expected would occur under the new presidential administration of Donald Trump. The press coverage of Brooks' departure reflected a general sense of surprise at the Board's unexpected decision, and several, including the president of the National Congress of Black Women, spoke out in favor of his reinstatement. In October 2017, the NAACP Board of Directors named Derrick Johnson the next president and CEO.

== Personal life ==
Brooks is a fourth-generation minister in the African Methodist Episcopal Church. Brooks was called to join the ministry while attending Jackson State University where he met his wife, Janice. He has two sons, Cornell II and Hamilton. Brooks is a member of Alpha Phi Alpha fraternity.

Non-profit organization positions
Preceded by Lorraine Miller; Acting	President and CEO of the National Association for the Advancement of Colored People; 2014–2017	Succeeded by Derrick Johnson
