= Edward David Bland =

American politician

Member of the Virginia House of Delegates from the Prince George/Surry district
- In office 1879–1884
- Preceded by: Robert E. Bland
- Succeeded by: William Faulcon

Personal details
- Born: October 1848 Dinwiddie County, Virginia, U.S.
- Died: February 13, 1927 (aged 78) Prince George County, Virginia, U.S.
- Resting place: People's Memorial Cemetery, Petersburg, Virginia
- Party: Republican
- Spouse: Nancy Jones
- Children: 9

Edward David Bland (October 1848 – February 13, 1927) was an American politician. A three-term member of the Virginia House of Delegates, Bland was known for helping to forge an alliance between African-American Republicans and the Readjuster Party.

== Early life ==
Bland was born into slavery, probably in Dinwiddie County, Virginia, to Frederick Bland and Nancy Yates Bland. After the Civil War, the family moved to Petersburg, Virginia, where Frederick Bland worked as a shoemaker and preacher. Bland learned the shoemaker's trade from his father, and attended a local night school organized by Northerners for African Americans. He married Nancy Jones of Petersburg on December 18, 1872; two years later, they moved to City Point, Virginia, where he worked as a shoemaker. The couple had nine children.

== Political career ==
Bland became involved in local politics in the 1870s. At a mass meeting of black Republicans in 1879, Bland gave a speech advocating an alliance with the Readjuster party led by William Mahone. With the support of the Readjusters, Bland was elected to the Virginia House of Delegates that year, defeating incumbent Robert E. Bland to represent Prince George and Surry Counties. He served on the Committee on Executive Expenditures and the Committee on Schools and Colleges, and was a delegate to the Virginia Republican Party convention in 1880.

After being re-elected in 1881, he served on the Committee on Agriculture and Mining, the Committee on Claims, and the Committee on Retrenchment and Economy. During that session, black Republicans passed legislation to create a state college and an insane asylum for Virginia's African Americans and increase funding for black public schools. Their success was followed by white backlash; in 1883, Conservatives launched a white supremacy campaign which helped them regain a majority in the Virginia General Assembly. Bland was nevertheless re-elected that year and served on the Committee on Propositions and Grievances, the Committee on Enrolled Bills, and the Committee on Officers and Offices at the Capitol. After serving his third term, he yielded his seat to Republican William Faulcon but remained active in local politics.

== Later years ==
Bland spent the rest of his life in Prince George County. He worked as a teacher, minister, shoemaker, and keeper of the Jordan Point Lighthouse, near City Point, Virginia. Around 1900, he moved to a farm, where he died of nephritis on February 13, 1927. He was buried at Providence Cemetery (now People's Memorial Cemetery) in Petersburg, Virginia.

In 2012, Virginia state senator Jennifer McClellan introduced a bill (VA HJR64) to "Recognize and celebrate the outstanding service of the African American men elected to the Virginia General Assembly during Reconstruction, on the occasion of the Sesquicentennial of the Emancipation Proclamation on January 1, 2013." The bill recognized Bland along with Samuel P. Bolling, Daniel M. Norton, and other notable African-American legislators.

In 1954, the Edward D. Bland Courts housing project in Hopewell, Virginia, was named in his honor.

Bland's descendants include civil rights leader Ben Jealous, his great-great-grandson.

== See also ==
- African American officeholders from the end of the Civil War until before 1900
