= Sharon Epperson =

American journalist (born 1968)

- Born: Sharon Emily Epperson; April 12, 1968 (age 58); Pittsburgh, Pennsylvania, U.S.
- Occupation: Television correspondent
- Title: Senior personal finance correspondent
- Spouse: Christopher John Farley (m. 1997)
- Parent(s): David and Cecelia Epperson

Sharon Emily Epperson (born April 12, 1968) is a senior personal finance correspondent for CNBC. She also appears on NBC News shows, Today and NBC Nightly News.

== Early life and education ==
Epperson is the daughter of David E. Epperson and Ceceila T. Epperson, a retired schoolteacher in the Pittsburgh Public School System, last teaching at Lincoln Elementary School in Pittsburgh. Her grandfather was a steelworker. Her father, now deceased, was Dean of the School of Social Work at the University of Pittsburgh for nearly 30 years and was the first African-American dean at the school.

Epperson graduated from Pittsburgh's Taylor Allderdice High School in 1986 and was inducted into their alumni hall of fame in 2011. She served a summer internship at the age of 18 in the Pittsburgh Press library department.

Epperson holds a bachelor's degree in sociology and government from Harvard University, a master's degree in international affairs from Columbia University, and an honorary doctorate from Carlow University in Pittsburgh. At Harvard, she joined the Lambda Upsilon chapter of the Alpha Kappa Alpha sorority. She has been an adjunct instructor of international affairs at Columbia University's School of International Public Affairs since 2000.

== Career ==
In 1996, Epperson began working with CNBC. She was previously CNBC's senior energy correspondent, stationed at the New York Mercantile Exchange (NYMEX) covering the commodities markets on a daily basis for eight years. In 2015, Epperson was one of six panelists covering the Republican presidential debate.

Epperson has covered personal finance in a column for USA Weekend magazine and her writing has also appeared in Essence magazine, The Boston Globe, The Washington Post, The Wall Street Journal, and Self magazine.

She also authored The Big Payoff: 8 Steps Couples Can Take to Make the Most of Their Money and Live Richly Ever After.

Epperson hosts the digital video series Retire Well.

== Awards ==
1995: 1st place honors from the National Association of Black Journalists for team coverage on Time magazine's cover story on the Nation of Islam.
1999: Silver World Medal from the New York Festivals, an international television programming competition.
2001: Gracie Allen Award from the Foundation of American Women in Radio and Television.
2003: Trailblazer of the Year Award from the New York Association of Black Journalists.
2003: All-Star Award from the Association of Women in Communications.

== Personal life ==
A native of Pittsburgh, she and her husband, Christopher John Farley, also a journalist and author, live in Westchester County, N.Y., with their two children. They have been married since August 30, 1997. Her sister, Lia Epperson, is a civil rights lawyer and law professor at American University Washington College of Law, and former NAACP CEO Ben Jealous is Sharon's former brother-in-law.

In 2016, Epperson suffered rupture of a brain aneurysm while at the gym, but had no permanent brain damage.

== See also ==
- New Yorkers in journalism
