= Derrick Johnson (activist) =

American civil rights activist

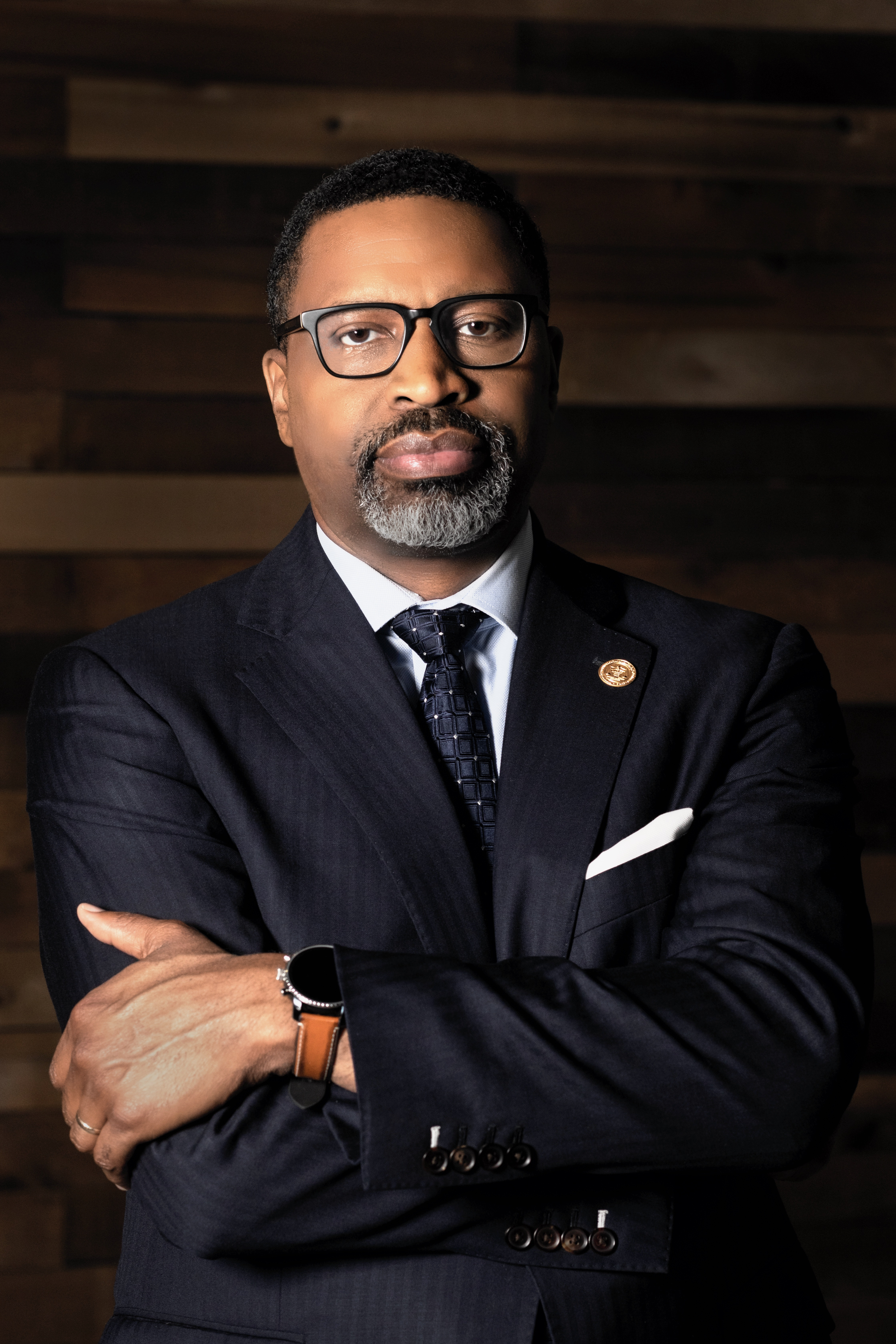

President and CEO of the NAACP
- Incumbent
- Assumed office October 2017
- Preceded by: Cornell William Brooks

Personal details
- Born: Detroit, Michigan, U.S.
- Education: Tougaloo College (BA); South Texas College of Law (JD)

Derrick Johnson is an American lawyer who is the current president and CEO of the NAACP. He previously served as president of the NAACP's Mississippi state chapter, and vice chairman of its board of directors. Johnson is the founder of the Mississippi nonprofit group One Voice Inc., which aims to improve quality of life for African Americans through public engagement.

== Early life and education ==
Johnson was born in Detroit. He attended Tougaloo College, then studied law at the South Texas College of Law, where he was awarded his Juris Doctor.

== NAACP ==
At the NAACP, Johnson works closely with the national staff, including Wisdom Cole, the National Director of the NAACP Youth & College Division for the Association.

=== NAACP Image Awards ===
At the 2020 NAACP Image Awards, hosted by BET, Rihanna accepted the President's Award from Derrick Johnson. In giving her the award, Johnson highlighted Rihanna’s artistic career in music, business achievements, activism, and philanthropy, stating "Rihanna epitomizes the type of character, grace, and devotion to justice that we seek to highlight in our President's Award.”

=== Re-envisioning of the NAACP ===
In a statement, the NAACP announced that Johnson was elected president to guide "the Association through a period of re-envisioning and reinvigoration." On June 30, 2020, with Mayor Muriel Bowser's support, the NAACP announced its plans to move its headquarters from Baltimore to Washington, D.C.

=== 2020 election ===
In an interview with GQ Magazine, Derrick Johnson expressed that the NAACP does not endorse Presidential candidates. However, when asked about Donald Trump, Johnson opined that he has not "seen a single president as bad as Trump." On June 10, 2020, the NAACP hosted a virtual town hall with former Vice President Joe Biden.

=== Jimmy Fallon interview ===
On June 1, 2020, Johnson joined Jimmy Fallon on the Tonight Show. In the interview, Fallon apologized for wearing blackface in an old Saturday Night Live sketch that had resurfaced. Johnson acknowledged Fallon’s apology as powerful and courageous, and emphasised the continued need for courage in speaking up with authenticity in an angry and hopeless time. Johnson later added, "we are all born flawed, but flawed is part of the journey we are on to get to perfection. If anyone can stand up and say, 'I haven't made a mistake,' run, because that person is clearly a liar."

=== DACA ===
On June 18, 2020, in Trump v. NAACP, the Supreme Court of the United States blocked the Trump administration's effort to rescind the Deferred Action for Child Arrivals program for young immigrants in "Donald J. Trump, President of the United States, et al., Petitioners v. National Association for the Advancement of Colored People, et al." The Supreme Court ruled in favor of the NAACP in a 5-to-4 decision. President Trump later wrote in a tweet that this was a "shotgun blasts into the face of people that are proud to call themselves Republicans or Conservatives."

GQ Magazine reported that under Derrick Johnson's leadership the NAACP had landed a huge win against the Trump administration, with Johnson noting, "It's a huge victory for us."

Johnson further stated that the NAACP’s decision to defend DACA came in part because of the organization's traditional role of being a voice for Black communities, which often included immigrants.

=== Facebook: Stop Hate For Profit campaign ===
In the summer of 2020, the NAACP launched the Stop Hate For Profit campaign, targeting Facebook and its founder Mark Zuckerberg for refusing to take down hate speech on the platform. In a live interview on MSNBC's Morning Joe, Johnson called Facebook "one of the biggest threats to democracy". It was later revealed that The Duke and Duchess of Sussex, Prince Harry and Meghan Markle were working with the NAACP in this campaign. Johnson praised the couple for embodying “the kind of leadership that meets the moment."

In an interview with Forbes, Johnson called on brands to boycott the platform, emphasizing his concerns about Facebook’s failure to regulate misinformation on its platform.

By July 3, over 750 advertisers joined the boycott, including Unilever, Ben & Jerry's, Patagonia, The North Face, Lululemon Athletica, Coca-Cola, Ford, Starbucks, Target, Pfizer, Microsoft, PlayStation, LEGO, Dunkin' Donuts, Best Buy, Adidas, Clorox, and Walgreens.

In response to these efforts, on July 1, 2020, CNBC reported that Zuckerberg would be meeting with the organizers of the boycott.

On July 7, 2020, Members of the Stop Hate For Profit coalition met with Facebook CEO Mark Zuckerberg. CNN reported that the meeting had not gone well. Derrick Johnson added, in an interview with The New York Times, that “They lack this cultural sensitivity to understand that their platform is actually being used to cause harm, or they understand the harm that the platform is causing and they have chosen to take the profit as opposed to protecting the people.”

=== CBS Studios partnership ===
On July 15, 2020, the NAACP and Johnson announced a multi-year deal with CBS Television Studios. Variety announced that the deal would involve developing and producing scripted, unscripted and documentary projects, with a particular focus on diverse and Black artists. The deal would not be restricted to CBS-owned platforms, and NAACP was permitted to supply content for third-party platforms.

"In this moment of national awakening, the time has never been better to further tell stories of the African American experience,” said Johnson. "Programming and content have the power to shape perspectives and drive conversations around critical issues. This partnership with CBS allows us to bring compelling and important content to a broad audience."

=== Meeting with President Biden ===
Johnson and others met with President Joe Biden on July 8, 2021. The meeting focused on the issue of voting rights. Johnson stated, following the meeting, that he was "encouraged" by the President's commitment to the issue.

== Other activities and commentary ==
=== Hurricane Katrina ===
The Chief Justice of the Supreme Court of Mississippi appointed Derrick Johnson to the Mississippi Access to Justice Commission. The Governor of Mississippi also appointed Johnson as the Chair of the Governor's Commission for Recovery, Rebuilding, and Renewal after his humanitarian work following Hurricane Katrina.

=== The Guardian ===
On June 3, 2020, The Guardian published an op-ed by Johnson titled "In America, Black deaths are not a flaw in the system. They are the system." In the op-ed, Johnson cited the statistic that Black people in America, making up 13% of the population, as three and a half times more likely to die of COVID-19 than white people. He pointed to racism and resulting inequalities as the underlying causes. This op-ed was quoted the following day by Wolf Blitzer on CNN, in a special coverage of George Floyd's memorial.

=== "Real Facebook Oversight Board" ===
On September 25, 2020, Johnson was named as one of the 25 members of the "Real Facebook Oversight Board", an independent monitoring group over Facebook.

=== COVID-19 ===
In a CNN opinion piece, Derrick Johnson highlighted the challenges African Americans faced in accessing COVID-19 testing and treatment, citing racial bias and a lack of available healthcare resources in communities. He also wrote about racial polarization in the pandemic response, particularly by the chief executive, leading to high levels of scarcity and unemployment.

== Notes ==
Non-profit organization positions
Preceded by Cornell William Brooks	President and CEO of the National Association for the Advancement of Colored People; 2017–present	Incumbent
