= Karen L. Haas =

American government official (born 1962)

Karen Haas
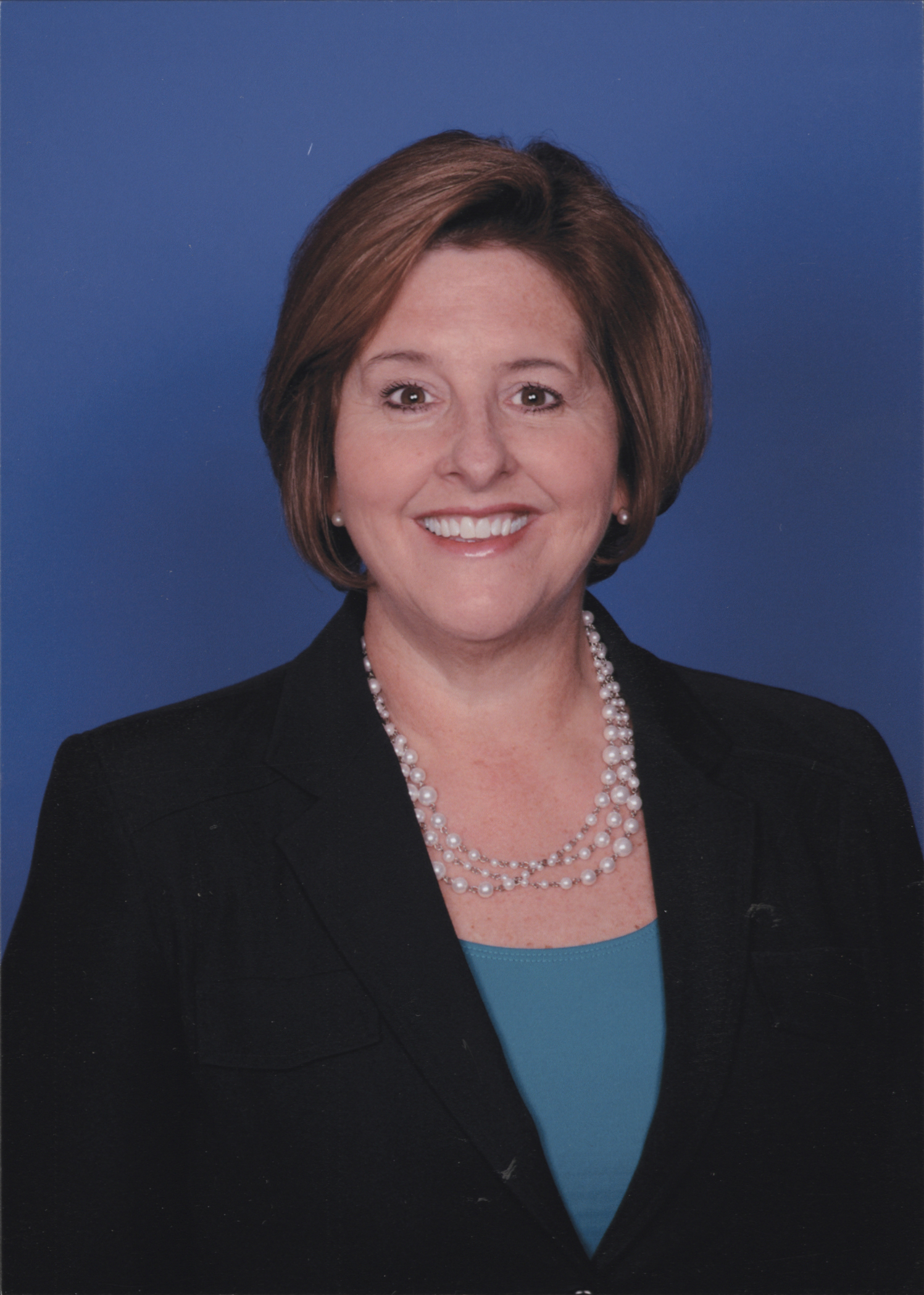

34th Clerk of the United States House of Representatives
- In office January 5, 2011 – February 26, 2019
- Speaker: John Boehner Paul Ryan Nancy Pelosi
- Preceded by: Lorraine Miller
- Succeeded by: Cheryl Johnson
- In office December 1, 2005 – February 15, 2007
- Speaker: Dennis Hastert; Nancy Pelosi
- Preceded by: Jeff Trandahl
- Succeeded by: Lorraine Miller

Personal details
- Born: April 13, 1962 (age 64) Catonsville, Maryland, U.S.
- Party: Republican
- Education: University of Maryland, College Park (BA)

Karen Lehman Haas (born April 13, 1962) is an American government affairs official who served as the Clerk of the United States House of Representatives from December 2005 to February 2007, and again from January 2011 to February 2019. After leaving the position, she was named to the governing board of the Office of Congressional Ethics in 2021.

A native of Catonsville, Maryland, Karen Lehman Haas graduated from the University of Maryland with a bachelor's degree in political science and a minor in economics. She is a former floor assistant to Speaker of the House Dennis Hastert and served from 1984 to 1994 as Executive and Legislative Assistant to Bob Michel while he was the Republican Minority Leader. Haas worked as a lobbyist for ABC/Disney and also has experience as a government affairs director for several corporate entities.

Government offices
Preceded by Jeff Trandahl	34th Clerk of the United States House of Representatives; 2005–2007, 2011–2019	Succeeded by Lorraine Miller
Preceded by Lorraine Miller	34th Clerk of the United States House of Representatives; 2005–2007, 2011–2019	Succeeded by Cheryl L. Johnson
