= Reach: 40 Black Men Speak on Living, Leading and Succeeding =

- Author: Ben Jealous, Trabian Shorters
- Language: English
- Genre: Nonfiction
- Publisher: Atria Books
- Publication date: February 3, 2015
- Publication place: United States
- Media type: Print (Paperback)
- Pages: 304
- ISBN: 978-1-4767-9983-4

Reach: 40 Black Men Speak on Living, Leading and Succeeding is a book of personal essays edited by Ben Jealous and Trabian Shorters. Black men from various backgrounds tell their stories and show how they have impact.

The book includes forty first-person narratives from Black leaders, community organizers, entrepreneurs, religious figures, philanthropists and educators. Contributors include John Legend, Rev. Al Sharpton, Bill T. Jones, Talib Kweli, Isiah Thomas, Melvin T Mason and Louis Gossett Jr.

Reach made the Washington Post national bestseller list for Nonfiction/General for the week ending May 10, 2015.
