= Kweisi Mfume =

American politician (born 1948)

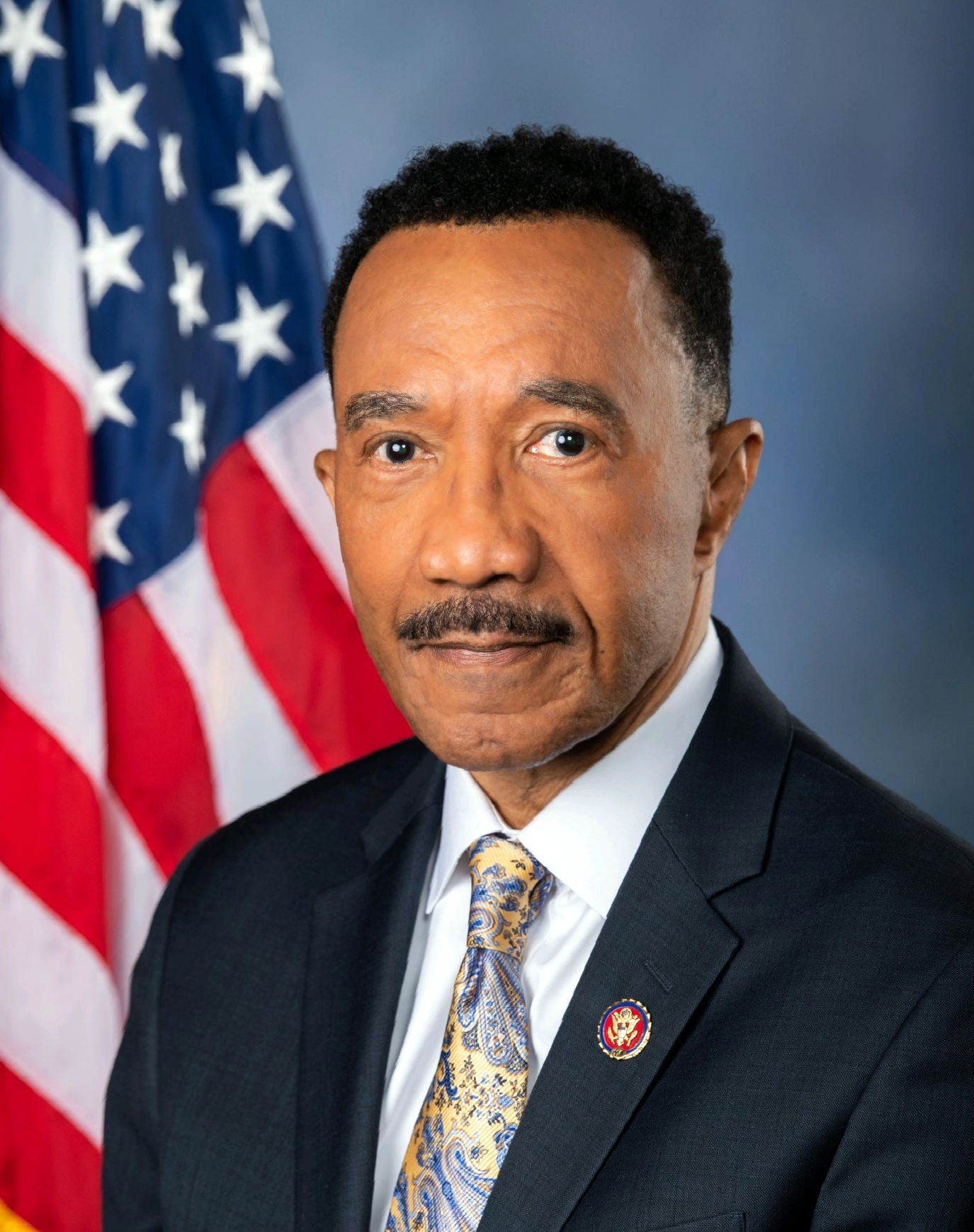
- Official portrait, 2022

Member of the U.S. House of Representatives from Maryland's 7th district
- Incumbent
- Assumed office May 5, 2020
- Preceded by: Elijah Cummings
- In office January 3, 1987 – February 15, 1996
- Preceded by: Parren Mitchell
- Succeeded by: Elijah Cummings

President and CEO of the NAACP
- In office February 20, 1996 – November 30, 2004
- Preceded by: Rupert Richardson (President); Earl Shinhoster (Executive Director)
- Succeeded by: Dennis Courtland Hayes (acting)

Member of the Baltimore City Council from the 4th district
- In office 1978–1986
- Preceded by: Multi-member district
- Succeeded by: Multi-member district

Personal details
- Born: Frizzell Gerard Tate; October 24, 1948 (age 78) Baltimore, Maryland, U.S.
- Party: Democratic
- Spouse(s): Linda Shields (m. 1972; div. 1975) Tiffany McMillan (m. 2012)
- Children: 6
- Education: Baltimore City Community College (attended); Morgan State University (BS); Johns Hopkins University (MA)
- Website: House website Campaign website
- Mfume's voice Mfume's first speech after his return to Congress. Recorded May 5, 2020

Kweisi Mfume (/kwaɪˈiːsi ʊmˈfuːmeɪ/ kwy-EE-see uum-FOO-may; born Frizzell Gerard Tate; October 24, 1948) is an American politician who is the U.S. representative for Maryland's 7th congressional district, first serving from 1987 to 1996 and again since 2020. A member of the Democratic Party, Mfume first left his seat to become the president and CEO of the National Association for the Advancement of Colored People (NAACP), a position he held from 1996 to 2004. In 2006, he ran for the United States Senate seat being vacated by Paul Sarbanes, losing the Democratic primary to the eventual winner, Ben Cardin. Mfume returned to his former House seat in 2020 after it was left vacant by the death of Elijah Cummings.

== Early life and education ==
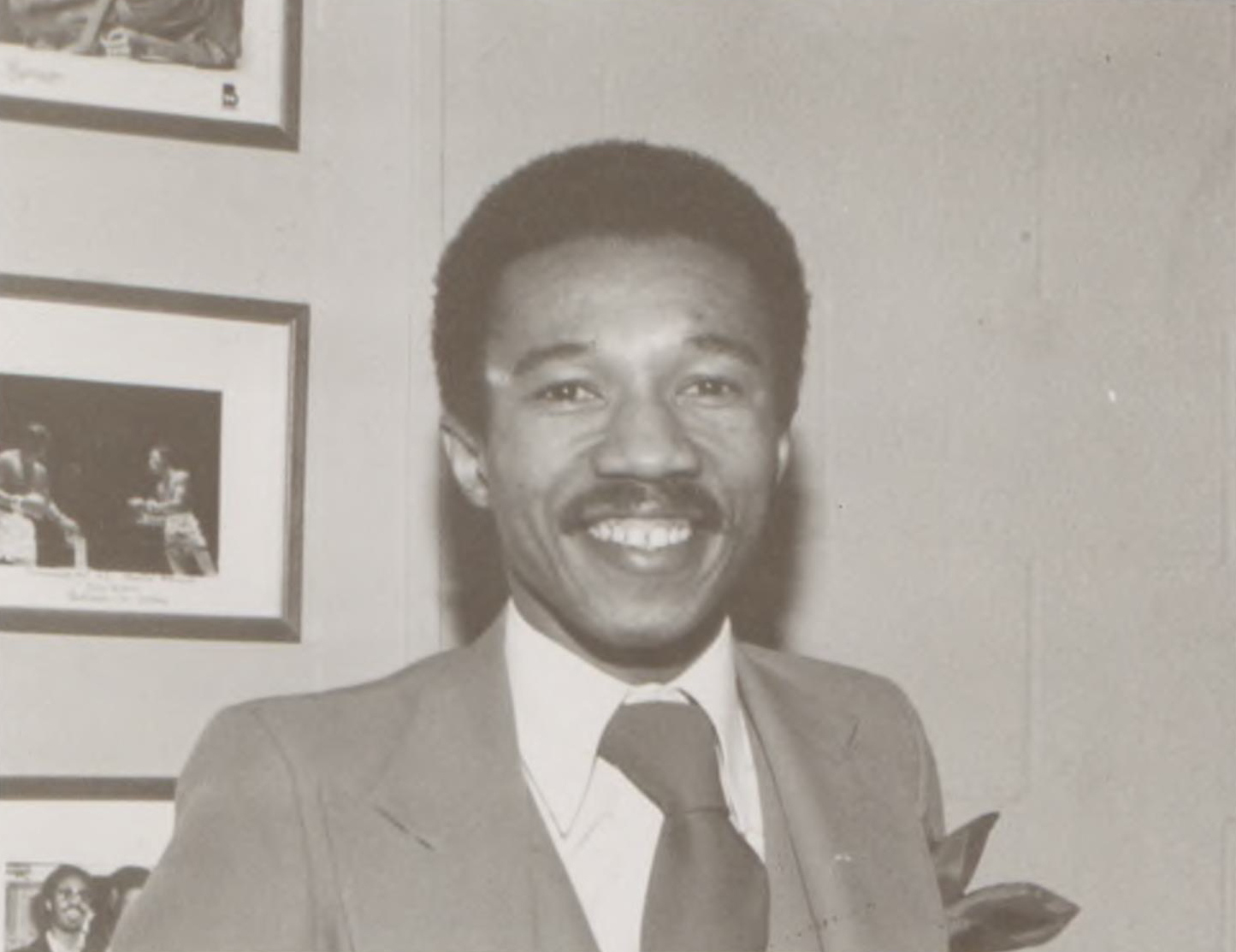
Mfume as program director of WEAA 88.9 FM, 1979

Mfume was born as Frizzell Gerard Tate in Baltimore, Maryland, on October 24, 1948, the eldest of four. As a child, his surname was changed to Gray after his stepfather, a truck driver who abandoned his family in Gray's youth. Upon the death of his mother, Gray dropped out of high school at 16 to begin working as many as three jobs at a time to support his three sisters. He also began hanging around on street corners, which included being in the company of gang members.

He changed his name to Kweisi Mfume in the early 1970s.

In his 1996 autobiography, No Free Ride, Mfume wrote that he "was locked up a couple of times on suspicion of theft because [he] happened to be black and happened to be young." Speculation as to the degree of his entanglement with the law has varied, especially as he later came into prominence. He fathered five children with several different women during his teenage years. He has since adopted another child.

Mfume received a Bachelor of Science degree from Morgan State University in 1976 and a Master of Science degree from Johns Hopkins University in 1984.

== Early career ==
In 1978, Mfume was elected to the Baltimore City Council, where he opposed mayor William Donald Schaefer, whom he accused of ignoring the city's poor neighborhoods. He was elected to the U.S. House of Representatives in 1986.

== U.S. House of Representatives (1987–1996) ==
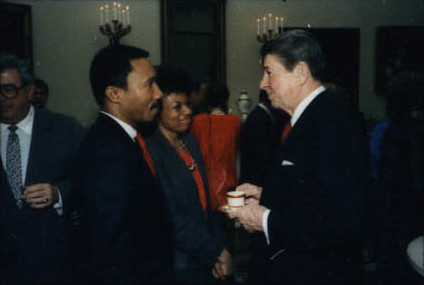
Mfume with President Ronald Reagan in 1987

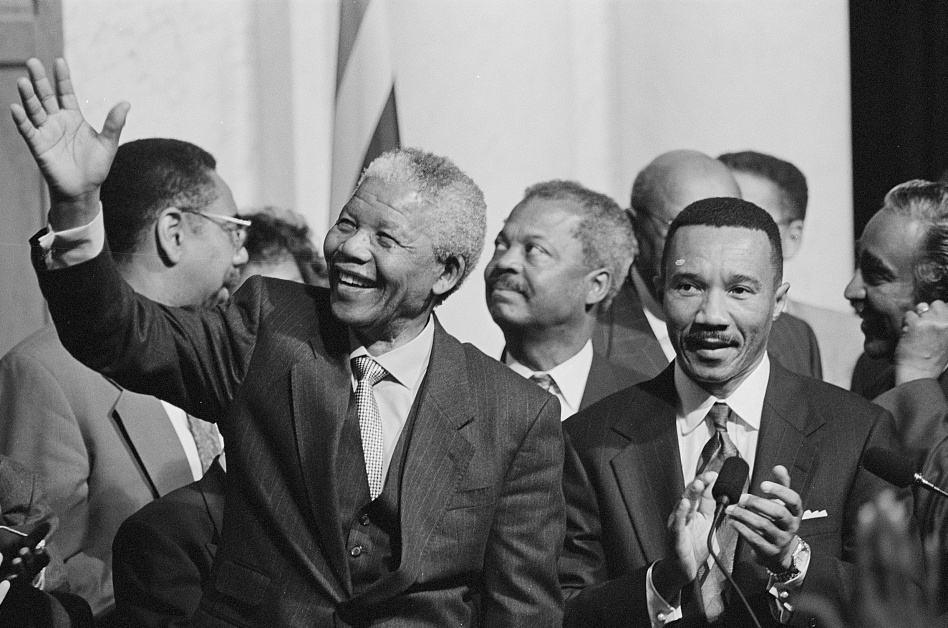
Mfume with Nelson Mandela in 1994

In November 1986, Mfume was elected to represent Maryland's 7th congressional district, succeeding fellow Democrat Parren Mitchell. He won reelection four times.

Mfume made himself known as a Democrat with an apparent balance between progressive ideologies and a capacity for practical compromise, representing a district that included both West Baltimore and suburban and rural communities, though his primary goal was an increase in federal aid to American inner cities. From 1993 to 1995, Mfume served as chairman of the Congressional Black Caucus.

== Post-congressional career ==
=== NAACP ===
Mfume receiving a special commendation presented by Miami-Dade County elected officials at a Florida NAACP meeting in 1999

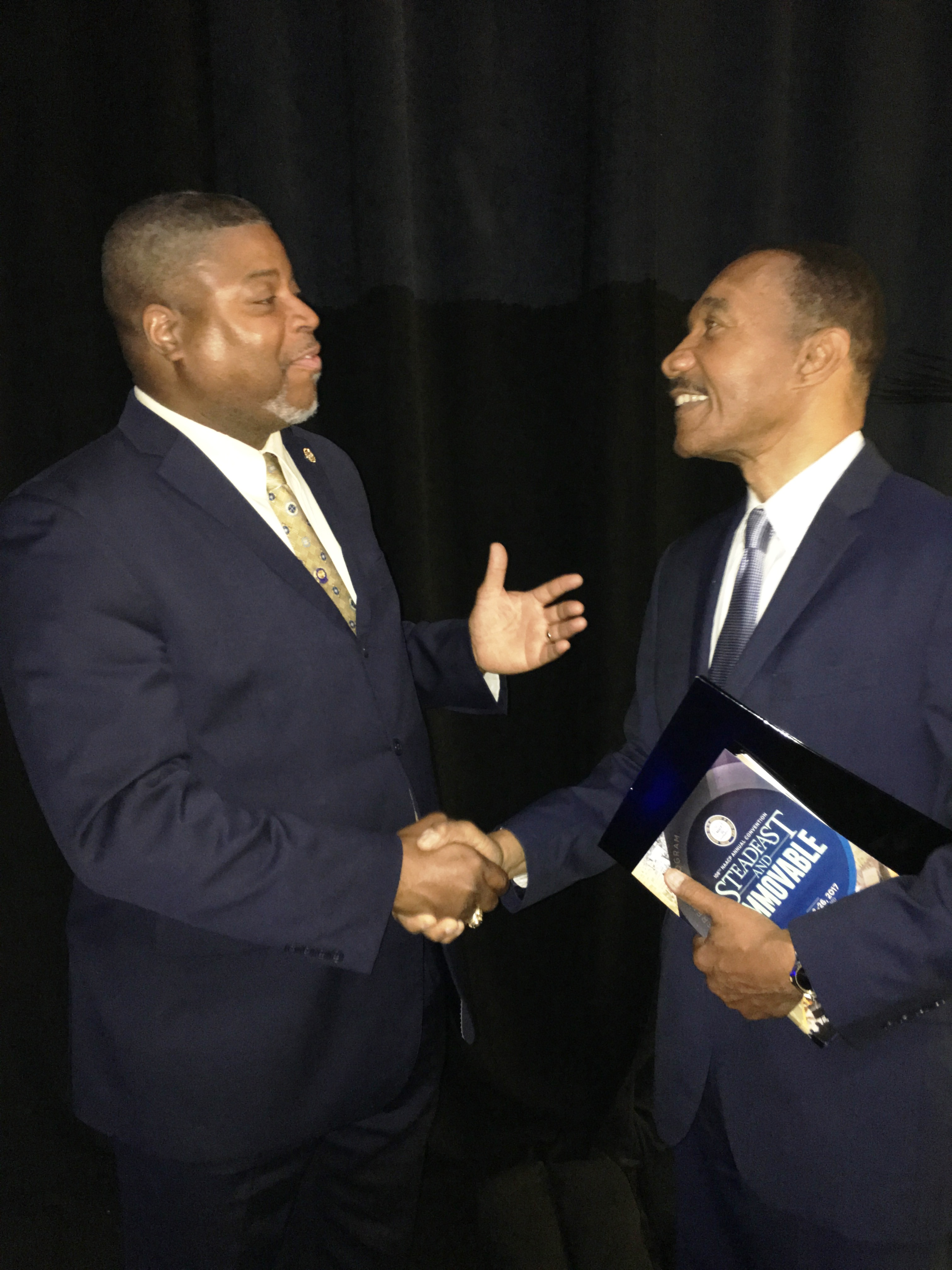
Mfume and Dayton, Ohio NAACP President Derrick L. Foward meet for the first time at the NAACP National Convention, 2017

In February 1996, Mfume left the House to accept the presidency of the National Association for the Advancement of Colored People (NAACP), saying that he could do more to improve American civil rights there than in Congress. He reformed the NAACP's finances to pay off its considerable debt while pursuing the cause of civil rights advancement for African Americans. Though many in Baltimore wanted Mfume to run for mayor in the 1999 election, he stayed with the NAACP.

Mfume stepped down from the NAACP in 2004 after an internal investigation of allegations that he had sexually harassed female subordinates. He acknowledged dating an NAACP employee, and in May 2005 apologized for having had the affair while leading the organization.

The NAACP reportedly paid out $100,000 to settle Mfume's alleged improprieties.

=== 2006 U.S. Senate campaign ===
On March 14, 2005, Mfume announced that he would seek the United States Senate seat of incumbent Paul Sarbanes, following Sarbanes's announcement that he would not seek reelection in 2006. Mfume lost the Democratic primary for this seat on September 12, 2006, to U.S. Representative Ben Cardin.

In the wake of his primary defeat, Mfume was believed to be considering running for mayor of Baltimore in 2007, though he had not publicly expressed interest in it. On November 13, 2006, Mfume told a Baltimore-area radio station, "I don't have any plans to run for mayor. She [incoming mayor Sheila Dixon]'s worked for and deserves an opportunity to lead. ... I want her to succeed. I want the city to be united. I think at this point we owe her at least the opportunity to try to lead it."

=== 2007–2020 ===
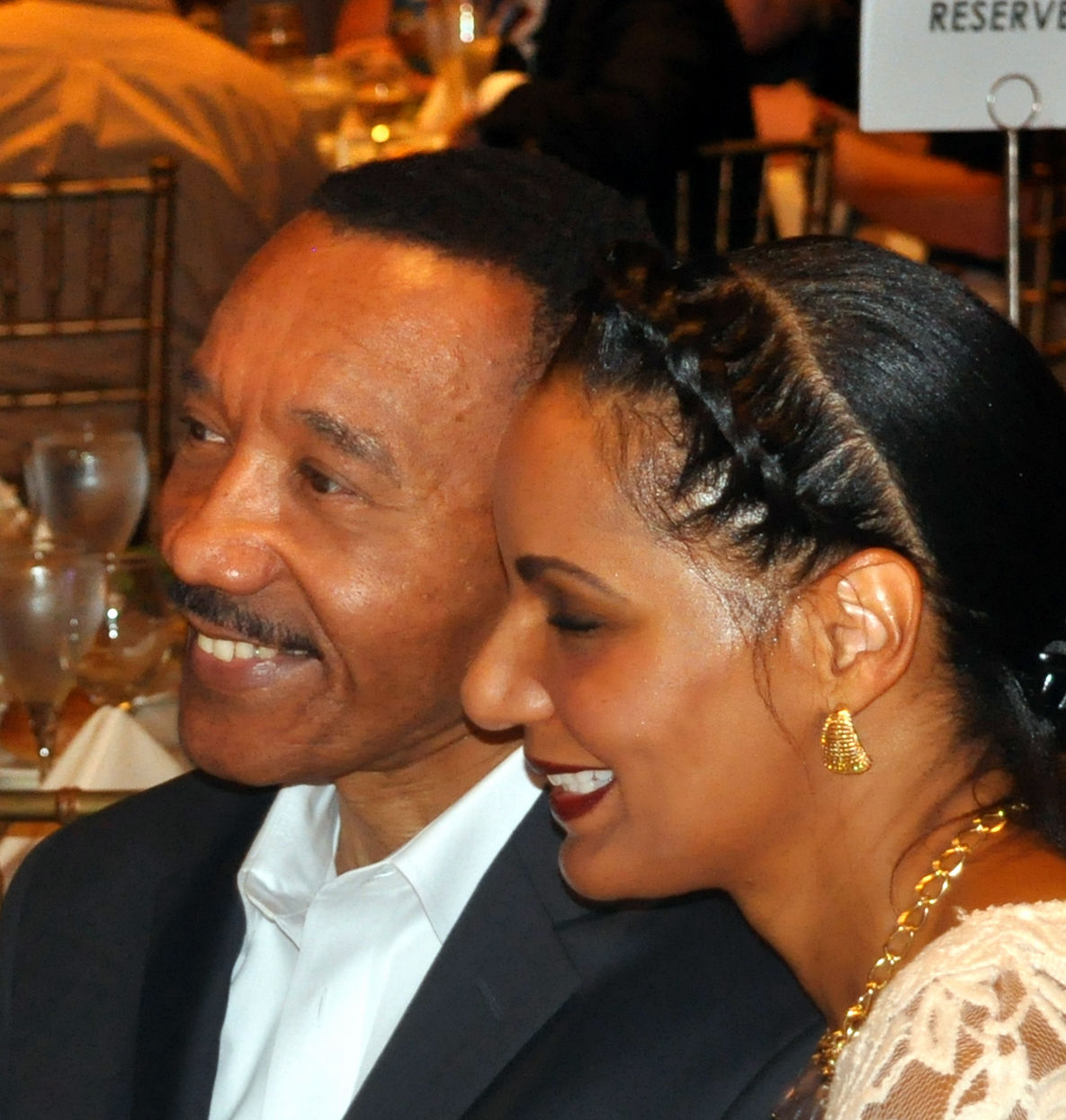
Mfume with wife Tiffany McMillan at the 2016 Democratic National Convention

In March 2010, Mfume was named chief executive officer of the National Medical Association (NMA). In late 2010, he was again rumored to be considering a run in the 2011 Baltimore mayoral election. He left the NMA in June 2011.

In May 2013, Mfume was named chair of the board of regents of his alma mater, Morgan State University. He assumed the position on July 1, 2013, succeeding the interim chair Martin Resnick.

From 2013 to 2018, Mfume was the principal investigator for the Health Policy Research Consortium.

== Return to the U.S. House of Representatives (2020–present) ==
=== Elections ===
==== 2020 special ====
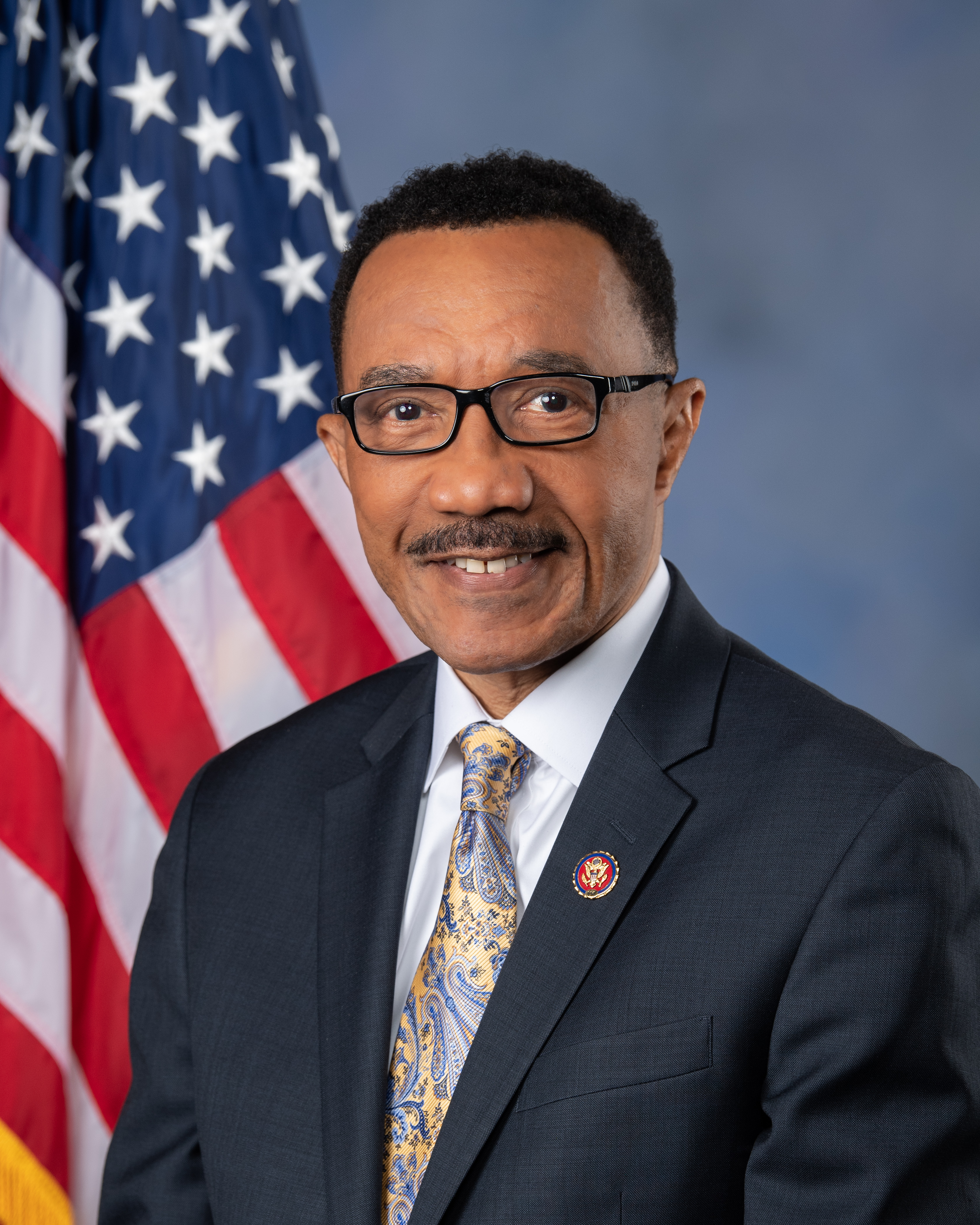
Mfume during the 116th Congress

On November 4, 2019, Mfume announced his candidacy for the special election for his old congressional seat to fill the vacancy created by the October death of Elijah Cummings, who had succeeded him in Congress. On February 4, 2020, Mfume won the Democratic nomination, defeating Maya Rockeymoore Cummings, Cummings's widow. As the 7th is a heavily Democratic district, this all but assured Mfume's return to Congress after a 24-year absence. He defeated Republican nominee Kimberly Klacik in the general election on April 28, 2020 and was sworn in on May 5.

==== 2020 ====
Mfume ran for a full term in the November 2020 race and won, defeating Klacik in a rematch.

==== 2022 ====
Mfume was reelected to his second term in 2022, winning 80 percent of the vote over Republican Scott Collier.

==== 2024 ====
Mfume won the general election with 80.25% of the vote, again defeating Republican nominee Scott Collier.

==== 2026 ====
Mfume was reelected in 2026, winning the general election with over 80% of the vote. He previously won 70% of the vote in a four-candidate primary field, advancing to the general election where he faced Republican nominee Scott Collier for the third straight cycle.

=== Committee assignments ===
In the 119th Congress Mfume serves on the following committees:

- Committee on Oversight and Government Reform
  - Subcommittee on Government Operations (Ranking Member)
  - Subcommittee on Military and Foreign Affairs
- Committee on Foreign Affairs
  - Subcommittee on the Middle East and North Africa
  - Subcommittee on South and Central Asia

=== Caucus memberships ===
- Black Maternal Health Caucus
- Congressional Black Caucus
- Congressional Equality Caucus
- Congressional Progressive Caucus
- Congressional Ukraine Caucus
- Congressional Bipartisan HBCU Caucus
- Congressional Caribbean Caucus

== Political positions ==
Mfume voted with President Joe Biden's stated position 100% of the time in the 117th Congress, according to a FiveThirtyEight analysis.

== Personal life ==
Mfume is a member of the Prince Hall Freemasons and Omega Psi Phi fraternity.

His first marriage to Linda Shields was from 1972 to 1975; it ended in divorce. In 2012, he married Tiffany McMillan, the granddaughter of Enolia McMillan, the first female president of the NAACP. He has six children, including Michael Mfume, who wrote, produced, directed and starred in the 1992 slasher film Ax 'Em.

== See also ==
- List of African-American United States representatives
- List of African-American United States Senate candidates

U.S. House of Representatives
Preceded by Parren Mitchell	Member of the U.S. House of Representatives from Maryland's 7th congressional district 1987–1996	Succeeded by Elijah Cummings
Preceded by Edolphus Towns	Chair of the Congressional Black Caucus; 1993–1995	Succeeded by Donald M. Payne
Preceded by Dave Obey	Chair of the Joint Economic Committee; 1994–1995	Succeeded by Connie Mack III
Preceded by Elijah Cummings	Member of the U.S. House of Representatives from Maryland's 7th congressional district 2020–present	Incumbent
Non-profit organization positions
Preceded by Rupert Richardson as President of the NAACP	President and CEO of the NAACP; 1996–2004	Succeeded by Dennis Courtland Hayes; Acting
Preceded by Earl Shinhoster as Executive Director of the NAACP	President and CEO of the NAACP; 1996–2004	Succeeded by Dennis Courtland Hayes; Acting
U.S. order of precedence (ceremonial)
Preceded by Bill Foster	United States representatives by seniority 77th	Succeeded by Rick Crawford
