= Ben Jealous =

American civil rights activist and businessman (born 1973)

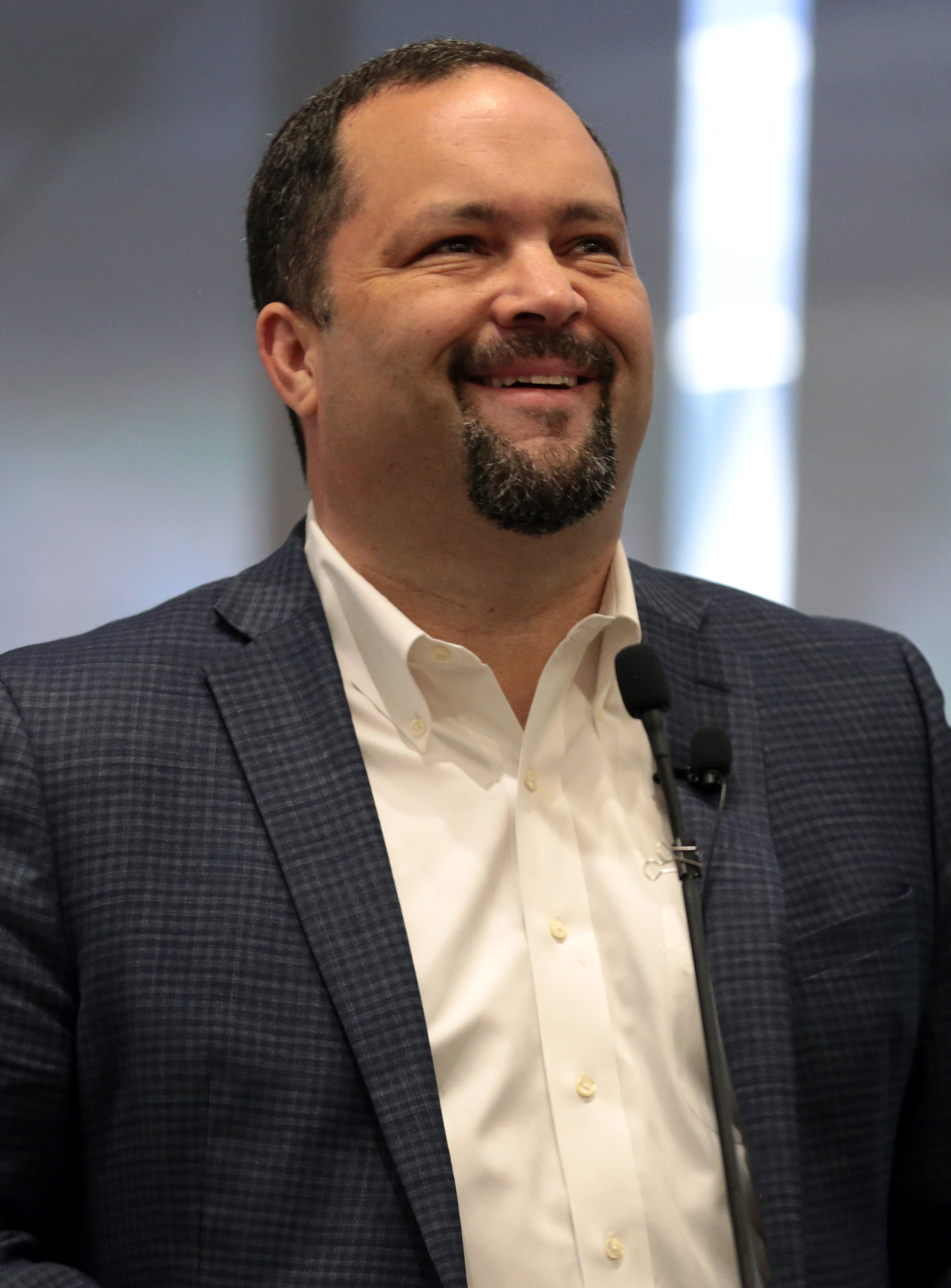
- Jealous in 2017

Executive Director of the Sierra Club
- In office November 14, 2022 – August 11, 2025
- Preceded by: Michael Brune
- Succeeded by: Loren Blackford

President and CEO of the NAACP
- In office September 1, 2008 – November 1, 2013
- Preceded by: Dennis Courtland Hayes (acting)
- Succeeded by: Lorraine Miller (acting)

Personal details
- Born: Benjamin Todd Jealous; January 18, 1973 (age 53) Pacific Grove, California, U.S.
- Party: Democratic
- Spouse: Lia Epperson (m. 2002; div. 2015)
- Children: 2
- Relatives: Thomas Jefferson; Peter G. Morgan; Edward David Bland
- Education: Columbia University (BA); St Antony's College, Oxford (MSc)

Benjamin Todd Jealous (born January 18, 1973) is an American political activist. He served as the president and CEO of the National Association for the Advancement of Colored People (NAACP) from 2008 to 2013.

Jealous was the Democratic nominee in the 2018 Maryland gubernatorial election, losing to the incumbent Republican governor Larry Hogan.

Jealous then served as president of People for the American Way from 2020 to 2022. In November 2022, he was named executive director of the Sierra Club. He led the Sierra Club from January 2023 until his termination in August 2025.

== Early life and education ==
Jealous was born in 1973 in Pacific Grove, California, and grew up on the Monterey Peninsula. His mother, Ann Jealous (née Todd), is biracial. She worked as a psychotherapist and had grown up in Baltimore. She had participated there in the desegregation of Western High School. She is the author, with Caroline Haskell, of Combined Destinies: Whites Sharing Grief about Racism (2013). His father, Fred Jealous, who is white, is descended from settlers of the Massachusetts Bay Colony, related to businessman Joseph B. Sargent, and directly in line to inherit the fortune from the Sargent and Co business. He founded the Breakthrough Men's Community and participated in Baltimore sit-ins to desegregate lunch counters. Jealous's parents met in Baltimore in 1966. At the time, they did not openly date each other in public; when they went to the movies, they took separate paths to adjacent seats to hide their relationship. As an interracial couple, they were prohibited by state law from marrying in Maryland before 1967. They married in Washington, D.C., and returned to live in Baltimore for a time before moving to California in the early-1970s. As a child, Jealous was sent to Baltimore to spend his summers with his maternal grandparents, who lived in the Ashburton neighborhood. Jealous graduated from York School in Monterey, California in 1990.

Jealous's father was best friends with comedian Dave Chappelle's father, William David Chappelle III; as a result, Jealous has been friends with Dave Chappelle since childhood, and the two are god-brothers.

Jealous earned a Bachelor of Arts degree in political science from Columbia University. A Rhodes Scholar, he later earned a Master of Science in comparative social research from St Antony's College, Oxford.

== Career ==
=== Early activism ===
At Columbia University, Jealous began working as an organizer with the NAACP Legal Defense Fund. As a student, he protested the university's plan to turn the Audubon Ballroom (the site of Malcolm X's assassination) into a research facility and was suspended. During his suspension, Jealous traveled through the South. During this time Mississippi's three black colleges were slated to be closed because of financial difficulties. Jealous organized with the local NAACP chapter to keep them fully funded and maintain their operations.

While in Mississippi, Jealous began working as a reporter for Jackson Advocate, Mississippi's oldest historically black newspaper, under the tutelage of publisher Charles Tisdale. He eventually became its managing editor. His reporting was credited with exposing corruption among high-ranking officials at the state prison in Parchman. In addition, he helped acquit a small farmer who had been wrongfully accused of arson. Jealous returned to Columbia in 1997, where he applied for and was awarded a Rhodes Scholarship.

After completing his degree at Oxford and returning to the US, Jealous worked as executive director of the National Newspaper Publishers Association (NNPA), a federation of more than 200 black community newspapers. During his term, he relocated the organization's editorial office to Howard University in Washington, D.C. He set up an online syndicated news service that shared content with all of the organization's member papers.

After the NNPA, he served as director of the US Human Rights Program at Amnesty International. He focused on issues such as promoting federal legislation against prison rape, racial profiling, and the sentencing of persons to life without the possibility of parole (LWOP) who are convicted for acts committed as children. (In 2012, the US Supreme Court ruled that such sentencing was unconstitutional, and ordered its ruling to be applied to people already in prison.) Jealous is the lead author of the 2004 report "Threat and Humiliation: Racial Profiling, Domestic Security, and Human Rights in the United States."

Jealous was President of the Rosenberg Foundation, a private foundation located in San Francisco, California from 2005 to 2008.

=== NAACP ===
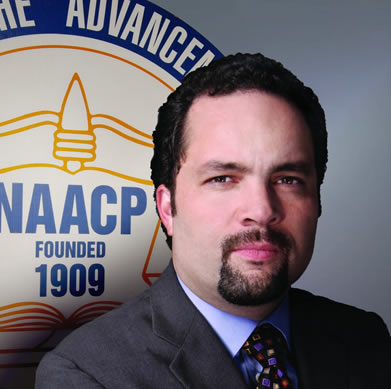
Jealous in 2009

Jealous was elected in 2008 as president and CEO of the NAACP; at age 35, he was the youngest person to serve in that position. He served until late 2013. During his term, Jealous initiated national programs on criminal justice, health, environmental justice and voting rights, expanded existing programs and opened the NAACP Financial Freedom Center to provide financial education and banking resources.

During his tenure, the NAACP helped register 374,553 voters and mobilize 1.2 million new voters to turn out at the polls for the 2012 presidential election. It supported abolition of the death penalty in Connecticut and Maryland, endorsed same-sex marriage, and fought laws it believed were intended for voter suppression in states across the country.

During Jealous's tenure, the number of NAACP's online activists increased from 175,000 to more than 675,000; its donors increased from 16,000 individuals to more than 132,000; and the number of total NAACP activists was 1.7 million.

Jealous led the NAACP to work closely with other civil rights, labor and environmental groups. In 2010 the NAACP was one of the conveners of the One Nation Working Together Rally, which Jealous referred to as "an antidote" to the Tea Party. In June 2012, the NAACP led several thousand protesters from different groups to march down New York City's Fifth Avenue in protest of the NYPD's policy of stop-and-frisk policing. In 2012 Jealous formed the Democracy Initiative along with other progressive leaders, to build a national campaign around three goals: getting big money out of politics, supporting voting rights, and reforming broken Senate rules. Finally, in 2013 Jealous gave the keynote address at the A10 Rally for Citizenship, a major rally for immigration reform at the US Capitol.

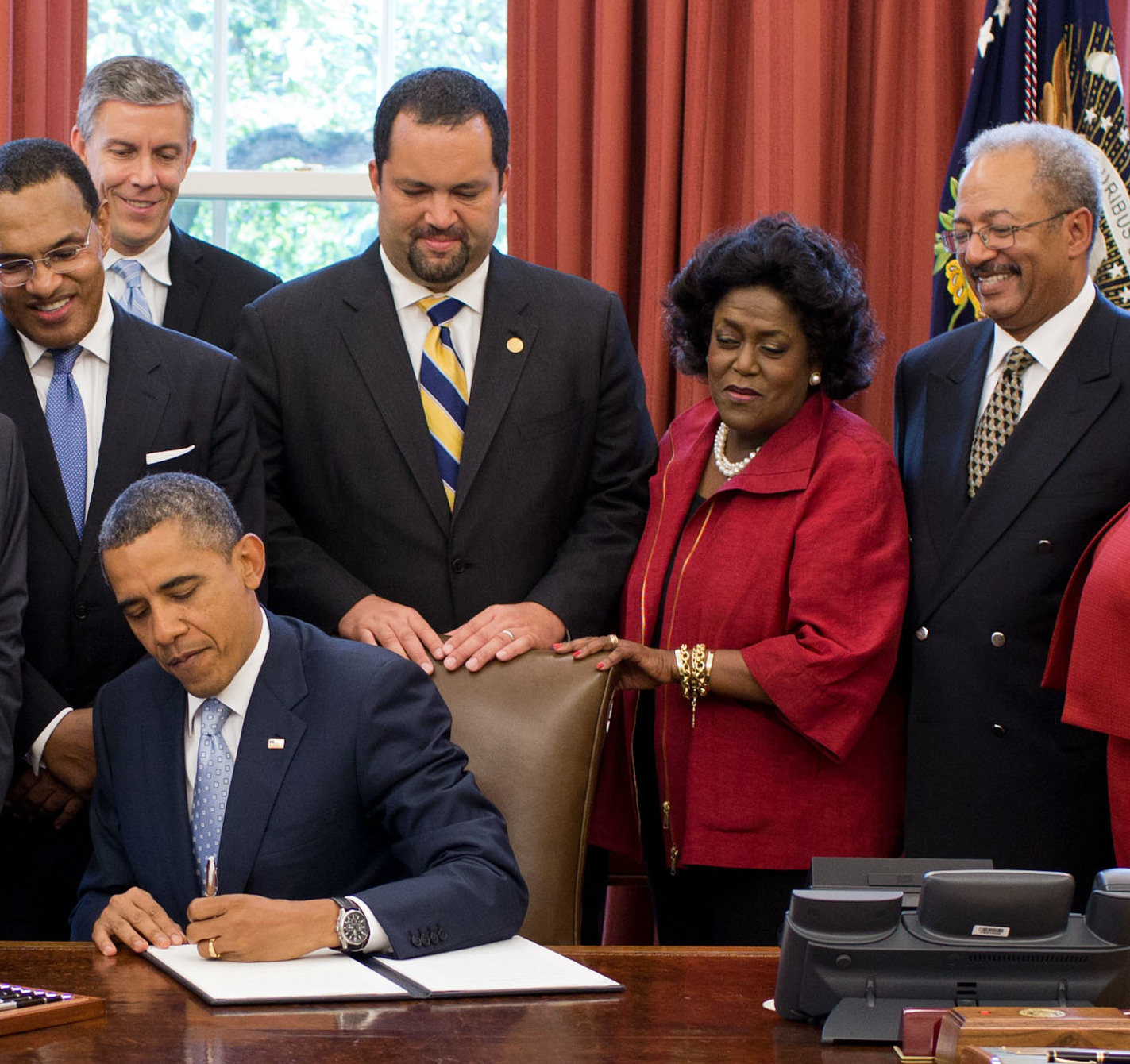
Jealous behind President Barack Obama as he signs the Educational Excellence for African Americans executive order, 2012

Jealous broadened the NAACP's alliances in 2011 at the National Press Club when a conservative coalition of criminal justice reform advocates endorsed an NAACP report authored by Jealous. In the report, Jealous highlights the adverse effects of over-incarceration of youth on society and the case for increasing public funding for education. In Texas later that year, the NAACP worked with leaders of the Tea Party to pass a dozen criminal justice reform measures, leading to the first scheduled prison closure in state history. Similarly, in 2013, the NAACP worked closely with Virginia Governor Bob McDonnell to pass bipartisan voting rights reform that gave former offenders the chance to vote after they served the terms of their sentence.

Upon announcing his resignation in 2013, Jealous was praised by activists for his coalition-building efforts.

Jealous was noted for reviving and building the resources of the NAACP. According to The Chronicle of Philanthropy, he was:

...credited with infusing the organization, once seen as graying and vulnerable, with energy, modernity... On his watch over the past five years, the group doubled its budget and national staff, thanks to sometimes explosive growth in fundraising. It shook off years of scandal and torpor, racked up victories in city halls and statehouses, and registered hundreds of thousands of voters. Now, as Mr. Jealous, 40, this week announces his resignation... he leaves a road map for reinvigorating nonprofit advocacy.

=== 2018 Maryland gubernatorial election campaign ===
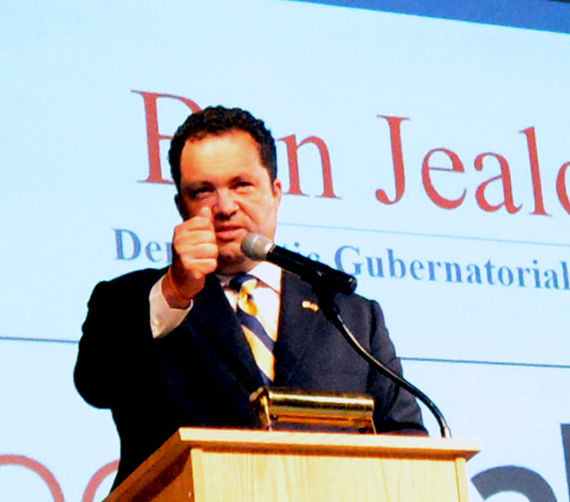
Jealous campaigning in September 2018

On May 31, 2017, Jealous announced his candidacy for governor of Maryland in the 2018 election, then held by Larry Hogan (R). His running mate was Susan Turnbull.

Many labor and progressive groups issued early endorsements of Jealous, including the American Postal Workers Union (APWU-Maryland), Communications Workers of America (CWA), National Nurses United, the Maryland State Education Association, the Service Employees International Union (SEIU), UNITE-HERE, Democracy for America, Friends of the Earth Action, the Maryland Working Families Party, Our Revolution and Progressive Maryland.

Jealous received endorsements from Senators Bernie Sanders, Cory Booker, and Kamala Harris, as well as longtime friend, comedian Dave Chappelle.

The Democratic primary was held on June 26, 2018. Despite trailing in polling in the months prior to the primary, Jealous and Turnbull won the primary with 40% of the vote in a nine-candidate field, 10% ahead of the second place duo.

Jealous ran on a platform that included free college tuition, legalized marijuana, universal healthcare, and a $15 minimum wage for Marylanders. His views were described by an analyst for Circa News as democratic socialist. However, Jealous disputed this characterization. On August 8, 2018, when questioned by a reporter about whether he considered himself a socialist, Jealous referred to himself as a "venture capitalist." When the reporter asked a second time whether he was a socialist, he responded, "Are you fucking kidding me?"

In October 2018, Jealous confirmed to Washington Jewish Week that he would "vow to defend" the Executive Order by Hogan related to banning companies from working with the state who boycott the Israeli Occupation and/or settlements. This order is very similar to one the ACLU successfully challenged into suspension in Arizona as unconstitutional. Jealous's campaign added that if the ACLU was successful in suspending the Maryland order, he would "bring leaders in the Jewish community and the Maryland-Israel Development Center together ...to figure out if there's a constitutional way to discourage the BDS movement in Maryland."

The general election was held on November 6, 2018, and Jealous lost the election to the incumbent governor, Hogan by a wide margin of 11.9%.

=== Memberships ===
In 2014, Jealous became a senior partner at Kapor Capital. He also joined the Center for American Progress as a senior fellow.

As of 2025, Jealous is a contributing editor for The Daytona Times.

=== Political endorsements ===
Jealous is a progressive Democrat. He endorsed Bernie Sanders in his 2016 campaign for U.S. president, then supported Hillary Clinton after she became the Democratic nominee.

=== Sierra Club ===
Ben Jealous was appointed executive director of the Sierra Club in 2022, following the departure of Michael Brune, during a period when the environmental organization had no permanent leadership. Jealous's tenure has been marked by significant internal strife, including repeated restructures and layoffs that sparked tension with staff, unions, and stakeholders. Allegations of unfair labor practices and union-busting were filed against both Jealous and the Sierra Club, contributing to growing discontent within the organization. In the spring of 2024, Progressive Workers Union, which represents over 50% of Sierra Club staff, conducted a vote of no confidence in Jealous's leadership.

In April 2025, Robert D. Bullard publicly requested that the Sierra Club remove his name from its Robert Bullard Environmental Justice Award, citing unmet promises and a failure to protect the predominantly Black Shiloh community. His statement intensified criticism of Jealous's leadership, after Jealous was reported to have referred to Bullard and community members as "snakes" in response to public criticism. Bullard subsequently called for a vote of no confidence in Jealous. Multiple no-confidence votes from staff, volunteers, and chapters further underscored organizational unrest. In July 2025, Jealous took a leave of absence from his role at the Sierra Club.

In August 2025, Jealous was removed from his position as executive director following a unanimous vote by the organization's board of directors. The decision was a culmination of internal disputes and allegations regarding Jealous's leadership and conduct.

The primary allegation against Jealous centered around his behavior towards staff and his perceived lack of transparency in handling organizational matters. Reports surfaced that Jealous exhibited a pattern of jealousy and undermining of colleagues, particularly in relation to the Sierra Club's senior leadership and key partners. These actions were described as fostering a toxic work environment that diminished the organization's ability to work effectively.

An independent investigation was launched following multiple complaints, which concluded that Jealous's leadership style had led to growing tensions within the organization. The investigation also uncovered claims that Jealous had publicly disparaged colleagues and worked to consolidate power in a way that alienated other stakeholders. In August 2025, Bloomberg revealed that Jealous faced a sexual harassment and bullying complaint.

== Personal life ==
Jealous has been a vegetarian since 1978. Jealous was married to Lia Epperson, an NAACP lawyer and law professor at American University Washington College of Law in July 2002. Epperson is the sister of CNBC correspondent Sharon Epperson. Jealous and Epperson have two children. The couple divorced in 2015. He is a resident of Alameda, California.

== Awards and honors ==
Jealous has earned the following awards and honors for his activism:

- In March 2009, Jealous received the John Jay Award for distinguished professional achievement from Columbia College and in 2010 spoke as the Class Day speaker at Columbia University.
- In 2010, Jealous was named to Time magazine's "40 Under 40" rising stars of American politics.
- In 2010 and 2011, Jealous was named to the Nonprofit Times "Power & Influence Top 50" list.
- In 2012 Jealous was named to Fortune magazine's "40 Under 40" list.
- Jealous was ranked No. 3 on the 2012 Root Top 100 list.
- In December 2012, Jealous was awarded the 2012 Puffin/Nation Prize for Creative Citizenship, which is given annually to an individual who has challenged the status quo through distinctive, courageous, imaginative, and socially responsible work of significance.
- In March 2013, Jealous was named a Young Global Leader by the Davos World Economic Forum.
- Jealous was ranked No. 1 on The 2013 Root Top 100 list.
- In December 2013 Jealous was named Marylander of The Year by the Baltimore Sun.

== See also ==
- Reach: 40 Black Men Speak on Living, Leading and Succeeding, a book of personal essays edited by Jealous and Trabian Shorters

Non-profit organization positions
| Preceded by Dennis Courtland Hayes; Acting | President and CEO of the National Association for the Advancement of Colored People; 2008–2013 | Succeeded by Lorraine Miller; Acting |
Party political offices
| Preceded by Anthony Brown | Democratic nominee for Governor of Maryland; 2018 | Succeeded by Wes Moore |
