= Dennis Courtland Hayes =

President and CEO of the NAACP
- Acting
- In office 2007–2008
- Preceded by: Bruce S. Gordon
- Succeeded by: Ben Jealous
- In office 2004–2005
- Preceded by: Kweisi Mfume
- Succeeded by: Bruce S. Gordon

Personal details
- Born: Dennis Courtland Hayes; January 29, 1951 (age 74); Indianapolis, Indiana, U.S.
- Education: Indiana University Bloomington (BS); Indiana University School of Law – Indianapolis (JD)

Dennis Courtland Hayes (born January 29, 1951) was General Counsel as well as the interim President and CEO of the National Association for the Advancement of Colored People in 2005 and from 2007 to 2008. During his time as interim CEO, Hayes criticized President George W. Bush's Social Security reform proposals and Major League Baseball's recruitment efforts of black baseball players.

Non-profit organization positions
Preceded by Kweisi Mfume	President and CEO of the National Association for the Advancement of Colored People; Acting; 2004–2005	Succeeded by Bruce S. Gordon
Preceded by Bruce S. Gordon	President and CEO of the National Association for the Advancement of Colored People; Acting; 2007–2008	Succeeded by Ben Jealous
