= Dennis Hayes (professor) =

Dennis Hayes (born November 1950) is professor of education at the University of Derby in England. He is the founder and director of the campaign group Academics For Academic Freedom (AFAF). AFAF was founded in late 2006, initially to promote its Statement of Academic Freedom but has subsequently undertaken the defence of many academics who have been threatened with disciplinary action or censored for their beliefs or ideas (see AFAF's The Banned List). Hayes is an author (with Kathryn Ecclestone) of the best-selling and controversial book The Dangerous Rise of Therapeutic Education. A defender of knowledge-based education he is an advocate of the teaching of Latin and Greek in British state schools.

== Selected publications ==
- Hayes, D. (2020) The Death of Academic Freedom?: free speech and censorship on campus, London and New York: Routledge.
- Hayes, D. (Ed.) (2017) Beyond McDonaldization: visions of higher education, London and New York: Routledge.
- Hayes, D. (2020) The 'Limits' of Academic Freedom, London: AFAF. (forthcoming).
- Hayes, D. and Marshall, T. (Eds.) (2017) The Role of the Teacher Today , SCETT: Derby.
- Hayes, D. (Ed.) (2011) In Defence of Teacher Education, SCETT: Worcester.
- Ecclestone, K. and Hayes, D. (2009 and 2019) The Dangerous Rise of Therapeutic Education, London: Routledge. ISBN 978 0 415 39701 8
- Hayes, D. (Ed.) (2004) The Routledge Falmer Guide to Key Debates in Education, London: RoutledgeFalmer. ISBN 0 415 33244 3
- Hayes, D. and Wynyard, R. (Eds.) (2002/2006) The McDonaldization of Higher Education, Westport, Connecticut & London: Bergin & Garvey. ISBN 0 89789 856 7
- Hayes, D. and Hudson, A. (2001) Basildon: The Mood of the Nation, London: Demos. ISBN 1 84180 060 0
