= Lorraine Miller =

35th Clerk of the United States House of Representatives

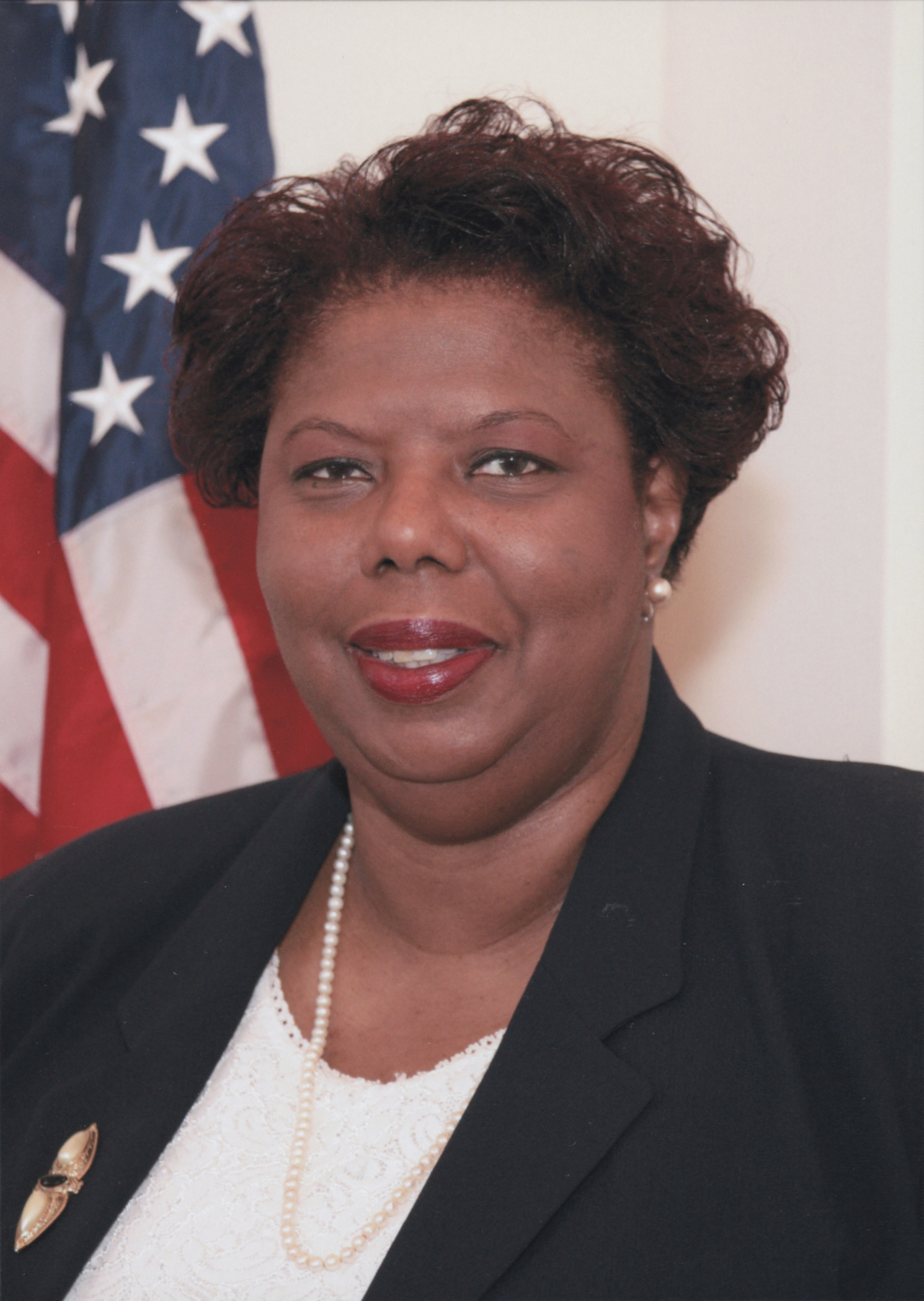

President and CEO of the NAACP
- Acting
- In office November 1, 2013 – May 16, 2014
- Preceded by: Ben Jealous
- Succeeded by: Cornell William Brooks

35th Clerk of the United States House of Representatives
- In office February 15, 2007 – January 5, 2011
- Leader: Nancy Pelosi
- Preceded by: Karen L. Haas
- Succeeded by: Karen L. Haas

Personal details
- Born: May 6, 1948 (age 77) Fort Worth, Texas, U.S.
- Party: Democratic
- Education: University of North Texas, Denton (BA); American University; Georgetown University (MBA)

Lorraine C. Miller (born May 6, 1948) is an American political administrator who served as the 35th Clerk of the United States House of Representatives from 2007 to 2011. Along with James Roosevelt, she is also the co-chair of Democratic National Committee's Credentials Committee.

== Biography ==
Born in Fort Worth, Texas, she attended Jarvis Christian College in 1966 before transferring to the University of North Texas two years later, earning a degree in political science in 1975. She later graduated from Georgetown University in 1998 with an executive MBA.

Since 2011, Miller works as a commercial real estate broker. She served as the first African-American clerk of the U.S. House of Representatives from 2007 to 2011 and the first African-American to also serve as an officer of the U.S. House of Representatives. she has been a member of the national board of directors of the National Association for the Advancement of Colored People since 2008. She was selected to the post of interim president and CEO of the NAACP to replace Benjamin Jealous, assuming that role on November 1, 2013. She is co-chair of the Credentials Committee of the Democratic National Convention.

Replacing Karen L. Haas in February 2007, she was the first African American to serve as an official of the United States House of Representatives. Miller left her post as clerk at the start of the 112th Congress on January 5, 2011. She was replaced with her predecessor, Karen L. Haas. Prior to being appointed to the Clerk post, she served as the director of intergovernmental relations for then-Minority Leader Nancy Pelosi. This was a senior position akin to the position of Deputy Chief of Staff and senior policy advisors.

In her tenure in the public service, Miller has served in a number of positions in both the legislative and executive branches. Pelosi is the third Democratic Speaker of the House that Miller will be working for, having worked for Tom Foley and Jim Wright in the past. In addition, she worked under Rep. John Lewis of Georgia. During the Clinton Administration, Miller served as a Deputy Assistant to the President for Legislative Affairs; in the late 1990s, she transitioned to her role as Bureau Chief of Consumer Information for the Federal Communications Commission. Prior to her service in the FCC, she served as director of government relations for the Federal Trade Commission.

Miller has also served as the president of the Washington D.C. chapter of the NAACP since 2004. As the Clerk of the House, she received a salary of $163,700 a year.

Government offices
Preceded by Karen L. Haas	Clerk of the U.S. House of Representatives; 2007–2011	Succeeded by Karen L. Haas
Non-profit organization positions
Preceded by Ben Jealous	President and CEO of the National Association for the Advancement of Colored People; Acting; 2013–2014	Succeeded by Cornell William Brooks
