= Broad Seal War =

American political dispute

The Broad Seal War was a constitutional and political controversy in the 26th United States Congress (1839–41) arising from the disputed results of the 1838 United States House of Representatives elections in the state of New Jersey, which would determine control of the House. The dispute was ultimately resolved in favor of the Democratic Party on February 28, 1840. The "war" is named for the "broad seal" of the state, which both delegations claimed to rightfully possess on their respective commissions of office.

Following the close elections of 1838, two contested contingents of the six New Jersey representatives-elect arrived at the House of Representatives on the opening day of the 26th United States Congress, requesting to be seated as members. While both held commissions bearing the great (broad) seal of the state, the Whig commissions were executed and signed by the Governor of New Jersey, William Pennington, while the Democratic commissions were signed by Secretary of State James Westcott. Clerk of the House of Representatives Hugh Garland refused to call the roll for the New Jersey delegation, citing the dispute and throwing the narrowly divided House into chaos.

After a lengthy dispute which delayed the election of a Speaker by more than two weeks, the House officially seated the five Democratic claimants on February 28, 1840, ruling narrowly that the clerks in Cumberland and Middlesex counties had suppressed the returns in certain towns that would have given the Democrats the majority.

== Background ==
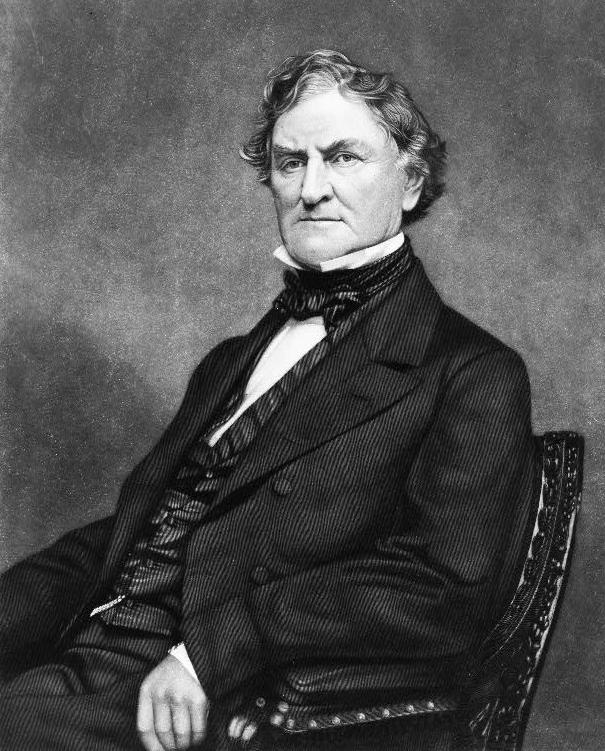
Governor of New Jersey William Pennington certified the contested results of the 1838 election in favor of his fellow Whigs, over protests.

Prior to 1842, all members of the United States House of Representatives from New Jersey were elected on a general at-large ticket by the votes of the whole state. For the 1838 elections, six seats in the House were apportioned to New Jersey.

On October 9 and 10, 1838, elections were held for the 26th Congress. On the face of the initial returns, the Democratic Party candidates received an average majority of about 100 votes out of roughly 57,000 cast, although Whig representative Joseph Fitz Randolph was re-elected by a safe margin. However, the Middlesex County clerk refused to count the votes of South Amboy, where the Democratic majority was 252, on the basis that the city's result had not been certified by an election inspector. Therefore, Middlesex County certified an official county vote without the South Amboy results, giving the Whig ticket the official statewide majority. A similar case occurred in Millville, Cumberland County, though the Democratic majority there was not sufficient to overturn the statewide margin.

The Democratic Party objected, arguing that similar defects had been ignored in Whig counties and, in any case, the law required the state canvassing board, the Governor of New Jersey, and the New Jersey Legislative Council to rule on the validity of the missing South Amboy returns. (Note: The Millville votes were not brought before the canvassing board.) The canvassing board refused, determining instead that they were bound by the county clerk's decision and delivered certificates of election signed by Whig governor William Pennington to the Whig candidates. However, Secretary of State James Westcott, a Democrat, provided a signed commission to Fitz Randolph and five of the Democratic candidates.

== Dispute in the House ==
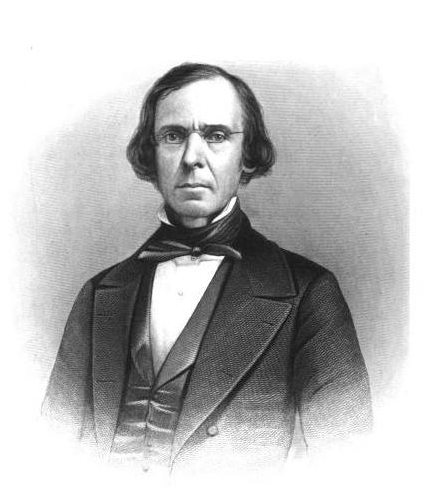
Clerk of the House of Representatives Hugh Garland declined to call the full roll for New Jersey, controversially determining that neither delegation should be recognized until the House was seated.

=== Roll call ===
The 26th Congress convened on December 2, 1839, and was closely divided between the Whig and Democratic parties. Outside of New Jersey, there were 119 Democratic Representatives and 118 Whigs. Thus, the resolution of the disputed results from New Jersey would decide control of the House. When the first roll call reached New Jersey, House clerk ex officio Hugh A. Garland of Virginia refused to call the names of the Whig representatives-elect on the ground that their election was disputed.

Garland's decision to rule the seats vacant was controversial as a matter of constitutional interpretation, given that the Clerk's traditional role was not to resolve election disputes but merely to determine and announce the initial membership of the House. Garland had also been elected narrowly by the outgoing House in a lame-duck session following the results of the 1838 election, heightening partisan scrutiny of his role in the dispute. Following the swearing in ceremony and election of a new Speaker, his term would expire, and he was expected to be replaced if the Whig Party gained the majority. Garland, an ardent defender of slavery, had also been elected along regional lines, with unanimous support from the Deep South and little support from Northerners, even within his own party.

=== House debate ===
Garland's decision set off an uproar in the House, which suspended business and devolved into ad hoc debate over the next three days. On December 5, former President John Quincy Adams, who had remained neutral in the dispute, was elected Speaker of the House pro tempore. Several unsuccessful attempts to elect a permanent speaker followed, with both competing New Jersey delegations voting on many questions. After several additional days of debate, a vote to continue the roll with the names of the five New Jersey Whigs was rejected by a 115–118 vote. Robert Barnwell Rhett of South Carolina moved that Garland complete the remainder of the roll call, and the motion was passed unanimously.

On December 11, the House voted to deny both delegations the right to vote, and on December 17, after another week of debate, Robert M. T. Hunter was elected permanent Speaker. Hunter, a moderate Whig from Virginia who supported states' rights and the controversial Independent Treasury bill before the House, was elected a compromise between the two factions.

On March 10, 1840, by a vote of 111 to 81, the five Democratic representatives were seated, and on July 16, the House adopted the majority report of the Committee on Elections, declaring them duly elected. Many Whigs refused to vote on the report, citing its length and the lack of time to examine it.

== Aftermath and legacy ==
The Whig Party won a resounding victory in the 1840 elections, sweeping control of the White House and both chambers of Congress. Hugh Garland was removed as clerk in favor of Matthew St. Clair Clarke.

The Broad Seal War is considered a reversal of the parties on matters of constitutional interpretation; the loose constructionist and federalist Whigs held that the state decision was binding on the House until reversed, while the Democratic majority abandoned their strict constructionism to hold that the state government's action was null in this case, arguing that all power to resolve disputes rested with the House.

== See also ==
- 1838–39 United States House of Representatives elections
- Contested elections in American history
- Presidency of Martin Van Buren
- William Pennington
