= John M. Franklin =

United States Army general and the president of United States Lines

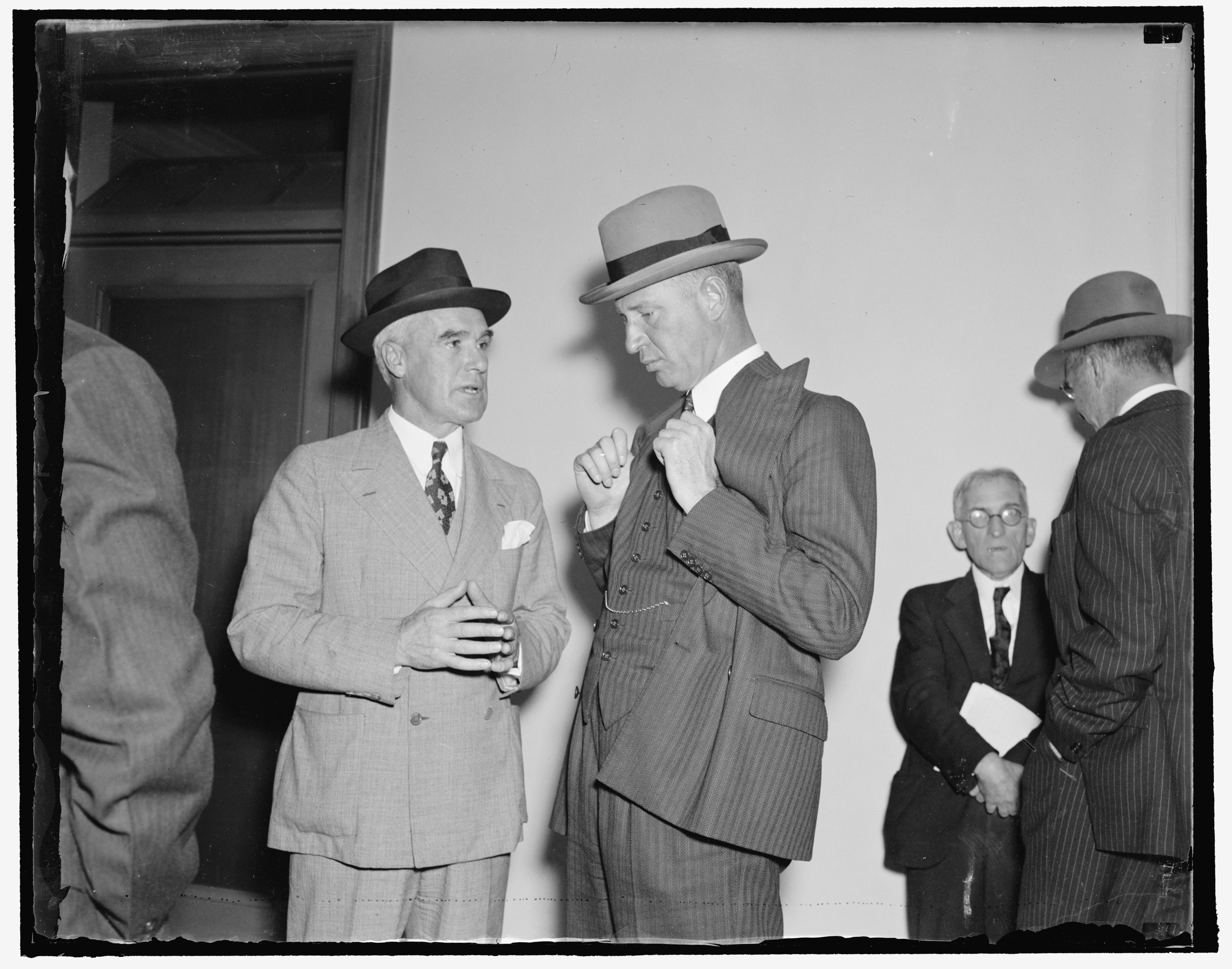
- (right)
- Born: 18 June 1896; Cockeysville, Maryland, US
- Died: 2 June 1975 (aged 78); Baltimore, Maryland, US
- Burial place: Locust Valley Cemetery, New York, U.S.
- Children: 2d, 1s
- Relatives: Philip A. S. Franklin (father); Walter S. Franklin (uncle); William B. Franklin (great uncle); Samuel Rhoads Franklin (great uncle)
- Military career
- Allegiance: United States
- Branch: United States Army
- Service years: 1918–1919, 1942–1945
- Rank: Major General
- Units: Tank Corps; Quartermaster Corps; Transportation Corps
- Conflicts: World War I; World War II
- Awards: Army Distinguished Service Medal; Bronze Star Medal; Military Cross (UK)
- Other work: President of United States Lines

John Merryman Franklin (18 June 1896 – 2 June 1975) was a United States Army general and the president of United States Lines. During World War II he was the Assistant Chief of Transportation for Water Transportation.

== Early life ==
John Merryman Franklin was born in Cockeysville, Maryland, on 18 June 1896, the son of Philip A. S. Franklin, a shipping executive, and his wife Laura née Merryman. He was the nephew of Walter S. Franklin III, and the great nephew of Major General William B. Franklin and Rear Admiral Samuel Rhoads Franklin. He was educated at Middlesex School and Harvard University. On graduation from Harvard in 1918 with a Bachelor of Arts degree, he enlisted in the United States Army. He served on the Western Front during World War I with the Tank Corps (United States) Tank Corps of the American Expeditionary Forces as a captain in the 301st Tank Battalion, and was awarded the British Military Cross.

After the war Franklin returned to the United States, and went to work with the Norton Lilly & Company, a steamship agent based in Norfolk, Virginia, and rose to become the head of its India Department. In 1927 he left to join Kermit Roosevelt at the Roosevelt Steamship Company, where he became a vice president in 1931. The company merged with his father's company, the International Mercantile Marine Company, and with the United States Lines. In 1936, he succeeded his father as chairman of the board and president of United States Lines. He married Emily Stone Hammond; they had two daughters, Laura and Emily, and a son, John Merryman Franklin II.

== World War II ==
During World War II Franklin was recalled to active duty in 1942 in the Office of the Quartermaster General of the United States Army with the rank of colonel. The transportation office was transferred to the new Transportation Corps in July 1942. He was promoted to brigadier general in March 1943, he became the Director of Water Transportation, and the Assistant Chief of Transportation for Water Transportation. In October 1944 he went to the European Theater of Operations, United States Army (ETOUSA) as its Assistant Chief of Transportation, with a mission to deal with the increasing number of ships that were being retained in the theater as floating warehouses due to lack of port capacity and depots ashore.

In January 1945, Franklin returned to the United States and resumed his former duties as Director of Water Transportation. By VE-Day he was in charge of a fleet of over 2,000 vessels. He was promoted to major general in June 1945, and oversaw the redeployment of US units from Europe to the Pacific Theater and the repatriation of troops to the United States after the war ended. For his services, he was awarded the Army Distinguished Service Medal in September 1945, and the Bronze Star Medal.

== Later life ==
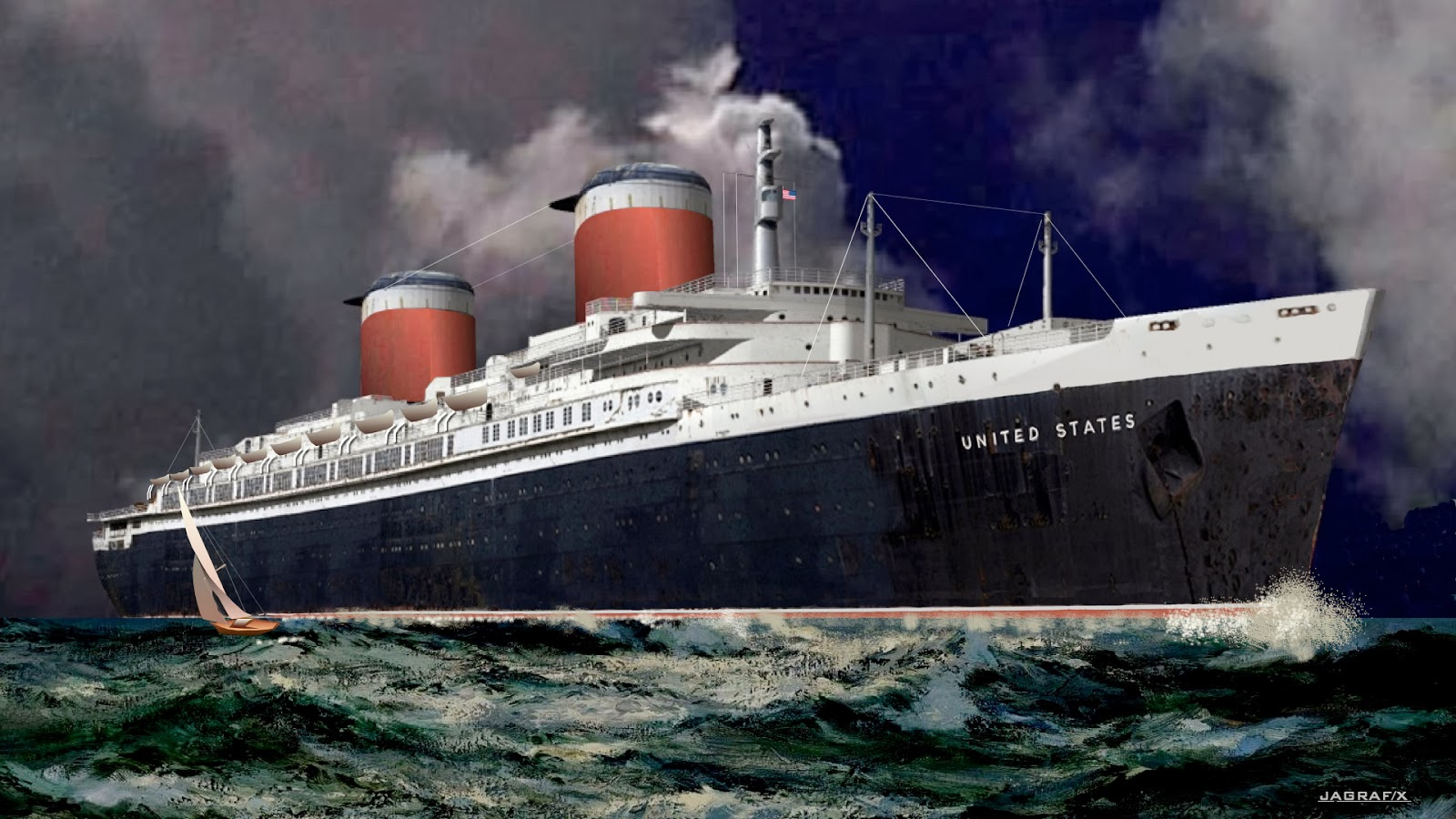
The SS United States

Franklin left the Army in November 1945 and became president of United States Lines once more. He negotiated the repurchase of the ocean liner SS America from the US government, and the acquisition and construction of a fleet of large, modern cargo ships. He oversaw the construction of the SS United States, a 53,330-gross-register-ton (151,000 m^{3}) liner that broke the transatlantic speed record on its maiden voyage in July 1952 with a 35.59-knot (65.91 km/h) outbound crossing and a 34.51-knot (63.91 km/h) return crossing. He forged a good working relationship with Joseph Curran, the president of the National Maritime Union, who had worked for him as a bosun in the 1930s.

Franklin retired in 1966, and went to live at Hayfields, a 600-acre (240 ha) farm in Cockeysville that he had purchased in 1939. There he enjoyed playing golf, riding horses and doing farm chores. He died at the Greater Baltimore Medical Center on 2 June 1975 after suffering a stroke. A funeral service was held at St. Bartholomew's Episcopal Church in New York City, and he was buried at the Locust Valley Cemetery on Long Island. Today his Hayfields farm is the site of the Hayfields Country Club.
