= Admiral Franklin =

Admiral Franklin may refer to:

- John Franklin (1786–1847), British Royal Navy rear admiral
- Samuel Rhoads Franklin (1825–1909), U.S. Navy rear admiral

== See also ==
- Peter Franklyn (born 1946), British Royal Navy rear admiral
