= Samuel Rhoads Franklin =

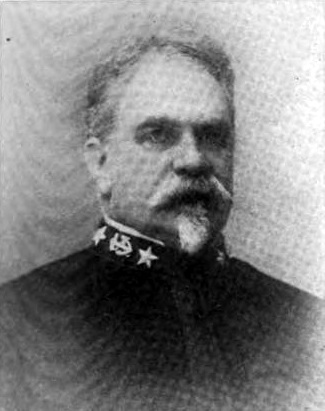
- Samuel Rhoads Franklin about 1908
- Born: August 24, 1825; York, Pennsylvania, U.S.
- Died: February 24, 1909 (aged 83); Washington, D.C., U.S.
- Burial place: Arlington National Cemetery
- Military career
- Allegiance: United States of America
- Branch: United States Navy
- Service years: 1841–1887
- Rank: Rear Admiral
- Commands: Various
- Conflicts: Battle of Hampton Roads (1862)

Samuel Rhoads Franklin (August 24, 1825 – February 24, 1909) was a rear admiral in the United States Navy. He participated in the important Battle of Hampton Roads off the U.S. state of Virginia in 1862, served as the superintendent of the U.S. Naval Observatory in Washington, D.C., from 1884 to 1885, and was president of the International Marine Conference of 1889.

== Early life ==
Samuel Rhoads Franklin was born August 24, 1825, in York, Pennsylvania, to Walter S. and Sarah (née Buel) Franklin. His father was Clerk of the United States House of Representatives, and his paternal great-grandfather was Samuel Rhoads, who had served in the First Continental Congress and as Mayor of Philadelphia in 1774. The Franklins were a prominent Quaker family in New York state. One Franklin ancestor married Senator and New York Governor DeWitt Clinton, while another married New York Governor and Vice President George Clinton. Samuel was one of six children. His older brother, William Buel, was born in 1823. Another brother, Thomas, was born in 1828; a sister, Anne, in 1830; another brother, Frederick Buel, in 1832; and another brother, Walter Simonds Jr., in 1835.

Franklin attended several private schools as a youth before completing his education at York County Academy, a prep school.

== Early naval career ==
On February 18, 1841, Franklin enlisted at the age of 15 in the United States Navy as a midshipman. As the United States Naval Academy would not be established until 1844, "midshipmen were left to educate themselves and one another. Their schools were held in receiving ships and cruising vessels, in the midst of a thousand interruptions and impediments, which render[ed] the whole system of little or no value." He was assigned to the USS United States of the Pacific Squadron, serving aboard her until 1843. The United States believed war was imminent with Mexico, and the commander of the Pacific Squadron had standing orders to seize the Mexican Pacific port city of Monterey in Alta California (now part of the U.S. state of California). Hearing a false report that war had broken out, the Pacific Squadron left Lima, Peru, and seized Monterey without a fight October 19–20, 1842.

At the time, the United States had no ports on the Pacific coast of North America, and naval vessels relied on storeships—naval vessels loaded with supplies and fresh water which sat, stationary, at sea. About June 1844, Franklin left the United States to serve aboard the storeship USS Relief. (Note: The United States Catholic Historical Society claims Franklin joined the Relief in 1845. But Franklin himself says that he joined the Relief in 1844. The date can be narrowed to June: Franklin says that Captain Alexander J. Dallas of the USS Savannah had just died. Dallas died on June 3, so Franklin must have joined the Relief that same month.)

== Antebellum naval advancement ==
In late 1844, at his own request, Franklin joined the sloop-of-war USS Levant. The ship spent some months cruising the North Pacific and the coast of Central America, and Franklin and some of his fellow sailors took several days to explore the interior of Nicaragua near the port city of El Realejo. When the Mexican–American War broke out in the spring of 1846, the Levant joined the Pacific Squadron and sailed to Monterey again. Franklin took part in the landing party which captured the city (uncontested) on July 7.

The Levant was ordered to return to the United States shortly thereafter. The ship arrived in Norfolk, Virginia, on April 28, 1847. Although Franklin could have joined the Class of 1847 immediately, it would have left him just two months to prepare for his examination. He therefore decided to put off entrance at the Naval Academy until October, and spent the months of July, August, and September at home in York, Pennsylvania. Upon his entry to the Naval Academy, on August 10, 1847, Franklin was promoted to "passed midshipman". Instruction lasted nine months, and Franklin passed. He was assigned to the United States Coast Survey, which he joined in mid-July 1848. The survey team spent the autumn months surveying the coast beginning at Cape Henlopen, Delaware; moving south to the tip of the Delmarva Peninsula; and up and down the east and west coasts of Chesapeake Bay. The winter was spent in quarters in Washington, D.C., and survey work resumed in the spring of 1849.

In mid-spring 1849, Franklin was ordered to leave the U.S. Coast Survey and report to the razeed USS Independence, then being fitted out in Norfolk as the flagship of the Mediterranean Squadron. The Independence sailed for the Mediterranean Sea on July 26, 1849. After an uneventful three-year cruise, the ship returned to Norfolk in June 1852 and was sent to drydock in New York City, where she arrived on July 3, 1852.

Franklin was given three months' leave, but was ordered to report to the sloop-of-war USS Saranac for another three-year cruise of the Mediterranean before it was up. Before the Saranac sailed, however, Franklin's ordered were changed and he was assigned to the USS Dolphin. The Dolphin was to cruise the northern Atlantic Ocean, taking deep-sea soundings to determine whether a subsurface ridge, plateau, or mount existed on which an undersea telegraph cable might be laid. In March 1853, the Dolphin made port at Norfolk, and Franklin was assigned to the U.S. Coast Survey again. He helped survey the coast around Woods Hole, Massachusetts; Sandy Hook, New Jersey; and along New England in the fall of 1853, wintered in Washington, D.C., again, and in the spring of 1854 worked around Nantucket Shoals off Nantucket Island, Massachusetts.

In October 1854, Franklin was reassigned to the Naval Academy, where he served as a disciplinary officer in the Executive Department. He was promoted to Master on April 18, 1855. Unhappy acting as a spy on midshipmen, he requested a transfer to the Department of Ethics and English Studies, which was granted in the fall of 1855. He was promoted to lieutenant on September 14, 1855, making his naval rank commensurate with his instructor's status.

At the end of the fall term of 1856, Franklin was assigned to the USS Falmouth. The Falmouth was in drydock, and did not relaunch until January 12, 1857. She was assigned to the Brazil Squadron, an understrength group of vessels patrolling the coast of South America from Venezuela to the Falkland Islands with the goal of protecting American shipping, indicting the West African slave trade, and protect American interests in the emerging region. During this time, the Falmouth participated in the Paraguay expedition, (Note: In February 1855, the USS Water Witch was surveying the Río de la Plata, a river in Paraguay. Paraguayan artillery at Fort Itapirú fired on her, slightly damaging the ship and killing one officer. The United States government demanded an apology and restitution, but the Paraguayan government refused both. In spring 1858, the United States Congress authorized a military expedition to Paraguay to force the issue. The Brazil Squadron rendezvoused with a fleet of ships from the United States, and arrived off Asunción, the capital of Paraguay, in January 1859. The Paraguayan government immediately issued apology and indemnity.) and cruised the Paraná River and Río de la Plata until April 1859. The Falmouth then returned to New York City on May 19, 1859, and was decommissioned.

After three months of leave, Franklin was assigned in September 1859 to the Ordnance Department of the Washington Navy Yard in Washington, D.C. After a few months, he was transferred to the U.S. Naval Observatory across town. Neither duty involved any training or experience; officers were expected to pick up knowledge on their own, and Franklin strongly disliked the work. He left the Observatory in mid-1860 and took several months' leave again.

== Civil War duty ==
In late 1860, Franklin was assigned to the sloop-of-war USS Macedonian. The ship was part of the Home Squadron, which patrolled the East Coast and Gulf Coast, suppressing piracy and the slave trade and assisting ships in distress. Franklin set sail from Portsmouth, New Hampshire, on the Macedonian on January 12, 1860. The American Civil War was on the verge of breaking out, and secessionists had seized the harbor at Pensacola, Florida. The ship stopped at the U.S. Navy base at Key West, Florida, and the Dry Tortugas. While at the Dry Tortugas, Franklin met Lieutenant Colonel Montgomery C. Meigs, then somewhat furtively taking stock of the various United States ports, forts, and harbors in the Deep South with an eye toward holding them if war broke out. Meanwhile, with the end of the Mexican-American War in 1847, Mexico had slid further into turmoil. With foreign intervention looming and a possible civil war, the Navy ordered the Macedonian to depart for the Mexican city of Veracruz to monitor events in that nation. Arriving at Veracruz, Franklin remained with the ship for some months before the Macedonian began patrolling the Gulf of Mexico and the West Indies. She received orders to sail for the Boston Navy Yard, reaching Massachusetts on January 16, 1862.

=== Battle of Hampton Roads ===
With the Civil War raging, Franklin was ordered back to the Washington Navy Yard, where he assisted in outfitting the gunboat USS Pinola. He was then assigned as the executive officer of the USS Dacotah, and rushed to Fort Monroe at Hampton Roads, Virginia. (Note: The U.S. Navy felt the Gosport Navy Yard at Hampton Roads was indefensible, and abandoned it. The Confederate States of America seized the shipyard, along with a great deal of war materiél. The Union navy then realized that this left them without a port or repair facilities anywhere south of Washington, D.C. U.S. Navy forces decided to hold on to Fort Monroe so that at least one base close to the Southern theater of war would still remain.) Because the Dacotah was still at sea, Franklin took up quarters aboard the USS Roanoke.

While Franklin waited, the Confederate States Navy completed construction of the ironclad warship CSS Virginia. Development and construction of the warship was widely reported in the North, which was deeply alarmed. On March 4, 1862, the Virginia was declared ready for combat. On March 8, the Virginia was towed down the Elizabeth River to engage the Union Navy fleet which awaited her: The Roanoke, USS Cumberland, USS Congress, USS Minnesota, and USS St. Lawrence. The Roanoke and the Minnesota were both steamships, and the most powerful warships in the Union naval squadron. But Roanoke's main shaft had been damaged four months earlier, and a replacement shaft was delayed due to the crush of wartime production orders. Instead, she relied on steam tugboats and her sails for maneuverability. Roanoke's captain, John Marston, was acting commander of the flotilla. (Note: Rear Admiral Louis M. Goldsborough, whose flagship was the Minnesota, was away during the battle.)

The Virginia entered Hampton Roads at 1:30 PM, and by 2:20 PM had engaged the Cumberland. The Roanoke passed the Rip Raps (a small, man-made island in the harbor's mouth) about the same time, she and her three tugs struggling against the current. As she passed Sewell's Point, Confederate shore batteries fired on her. She returned fire, but her 10-inch (25 cm) gun was too weak to reach them in return. By 2:55 PM, Virginia had critically injured Congress, and 10 minutes later rammed Cumberland. After being bombarded by Virginia, Cumberland sank at 3:25 PM. Minnesota ran firmly aground at 3:10 PM, and St. Lawrence at 5:30 PM. Roanoke withdrew at 4:10 PM. She ran aground on a shoal about 4:30 PM, although the tide lifted her off again a few minutes later, and she returned to Fort Monroe and the safety of the Union shore guns. By 5:45 PM, Congress had surrendered and was afire, and Virginia shelled both the Minnesota and St. Lawrence. But darkness began to fall, and the Confederate ship retreated to Sewell's Point for the night.

At 9:00 PM, the USS Monitor dropped anchor beside Minnesota. When the battle began again at about 8:30 AM on March 9, the only two ships to engage in active battle were the Virginia and Monitor (although the Minnesota, still aground, fired shots to defend herself).

=== Dacotah ===
The Roanoke departed for New York City after the battle, leaving Franklin ashore for a few days until the Dacotah arrived. The ship was assigned to the North Atlantic Blocking Squadron, serving in the waters off Hampton Roads as part of the Union blockade of the Confederacy. On May 18 and 19, 1862, Franklin and the Dacotah participated in an exchange of gunfire with Confederate shore batteries at Sewell's Point. He witnessed the scuttling and burning of the Virginia on May 11, 1862, and cruised to New Orleans, Louisiana, to deliver messages before returning Hampton Roads in late June. The Dacotah then joined the James River Flotilla, destroying forts along the James River.

=== Aroostook ===
In June 1862, Franklin was appointed commander of the USS Aroostook. (Note: Franklin does not specify the date of his appointment, other than to say it was summer. However, historian Mark Snell notes that Union Army forces did not seize Harrison's Landing, Virginia, until July 1, 1862. These forces were commanded, in part, by William B. Franklin. By this time, Snell says, Samuel Franklin was already in command of Aroostook. This places the date for the start of Franklin's command as June.) Franklin was promoted to lieutenant commander on July 16.

On August 31, the James River Flotilla was disbanded on the orders of Secretary of the Navy Gideon Welles, and Aroostook was assigned to the Potomac Flotilla, which was based at the Washington Navy Yard. After the Battle of Antietam on September 17, 1862, largely ended the Confederate threat to the national capital, Franklin was ordered to take Aroostook to the Gulf of Mexico and join the West Gulf Blockading Squadron. Arriving October 22, she joined the forces blockading Mobile Bay, Alabama.

Franklin saw his first extensive action while with the West Gulf Blockading Squadron. Her first major action occurred on the night of December 15, when she gave chase to a blockade runner attempting to flee. Although Aroostook lost sight of the ship, the next day they discovered the schooner stranded on shoals and aflame. In another action on March 5, 1863, Aroostook and another Union vessel destroyed the blockade runner SS Josephine. Aroostook attempted to intercept a small blockade runner on the night of March 6, but it escaped them and made it into Mobile Bay. Aroostook exchanged fire with shore batteries on April 19, captured the blockade runner SS Sea Lion on the evening of May 9, assisted in the capture of the SS Hunter on May 18, and again exchanged shore fire on June 23. At about 1:00 AM on July 17, Aroostook assisted in the capture of the SS James Battle.

=== Other Civil War duty ===
Franklin was relieved of command of Aroostook on July 28, 1863. He claims that he was assigned command of the USS Oneida, but since only someone of a higher rank could command such a large ship, he was forced to relinquish his duty. With his old command of Aroostook already filled, he had no ready shipboard duty. Instead, the Navy assigned him to the staff of Commodore Henry H. Bell, Commander-in-Chief of the West Gulf Blockading Squadron. Bell was new to the job, Rear Admiral David Farragut having recently departed for consultations and a different command. Bell appointed Franklin his Fleet Captain (chief of staff to a flag officer).

Farragut resumed command of the West Gulf Blockading Squadron in December 1863 and on January 19, 1864, his flagship (the USS Hartford) anchored off Mobile Bay. Farragut relieved Franklin, appointing Captain Percival Drayton Fleet Captain in his stead. Franklin's new assignment was as Fleet Captain on the staff of Commodore James Shedden Palmer, senior officer of U.S. naval forces on the Mississippi River in the vicinity of New Orleans. Admiral Farragut then won the Battle of Mobile Bay, but the city of Mobile did not surrender. Farragut asked to be relieved of command to take up other duties, and Palmer was appointed commander of the West Gulf Blockading Squadron on November 17, 1864. When Palmer departed for the New York Navy Yard, Acting Rear Admiral Henry K. Thatcher was appointed commander of the squadron on February 23, 1865. (Note: Thatcher was a commodore, but was appointed an Acting Rear Admiral after his success in the Second Battle of Fort Fisher on January 15, 1865.) Franklin remained on Thatcher's staff as Fleet Captain, and was the naval representative on the Union delegation which accepted the surrender of Mobile on April 12, 1865.

The Civil War had effectively ended on April 9, 1865, when General Robert E. Lee surrendered to General Ulysses S. Grant at Appomattox Courthouse in Virginia. Franklin spent a few months in command of the USS Portsmouth off New Orleans, but relinquished his command after a few months and returned to Pennsylvania for several months' rest.

== Post-war duty ==
=== Shipboard commands ===
On February 5, 1866, Captain Robert Wainwright Scott of the USS Saginaw died suddenly while the ship was at Acapulco, Mexico. Saginaw had spent the last six months of 1865 protecting American citizens and interests at various ports on Mexico's Pacific coast. Franklin traveled by ship to Panama, crossed the Isthmus of Panama by rail, and sailed to Acapulco to take up command of Saginaw. Saginaw reached San Francisco, California, in March 1866, and spent five months undergoing repairs at the Mare Island Naval Shipyard. She received orders to assist settlers in the Washington Territory, and said in August 1866 to Puget Sound. She then received orders to proceed to Esquimalt Harbour on Vancouver Island in Canada, where she spent several months assisting the Western Union in laying a telegraph cable across the Bering Strait. She returned to Mare Island in December 1866. Franklin was promoted to commander on July 25 or September 26, 1866 (sources differ as to the date).

Shortly after his return to Mare Island, Franklin was appointed Inspector of Ordnance at Mare Island. In late 1868 or early 1869, he was given command of the sloop-of-war USS Mohican. Mohican had been decommissioned on April 3, 1868, but was undergoing refit and recommissioning. She launched again on June 7, 1869, and Franklin was ordered to take a scientific party to Siberia so it could observe a solar eclipse. Sailing east across the Pacific, Franklin returned to Esquimalt Harbour, where he was instructed to set sail on October 11 for Hawaii. Franklin met King Kamehameha V of the Kingdom of Hawaii, as well as the future queen, Liliuokalani. Mohican returned to Mare island on January 11, 1870.

Franklin was assigned to equipment duty at Mare Island upon his return, and served in that capacity until mid 1872. He was ordered back east to the newly constructed New London Naval Station in Connecticut. He served at new London from July to September 1872, during which time he was promoted to captain on August 13, 1872. He was transferred to the Washington Navy Yard in September 1872, serving there until December. After two months' leave, he was appointed Executive Office of the New London Naval Station, returning to duty there on March 1, 1873.

Franklin was then given command of the USS Wabash in April 1873, and appointed chief of staff to Rear Admiral Augustus Case. He sailed on a civilian ship for the United Kingdom and spent time visiting London before sailing to France and touring Paris. He then traveled overland to Villefranche-sur-Mer on the Mediterranean coast of France, where he joined the Wabash. Franklin cruised the Mediterranean Sea until November 30, 1873, he received orders to head for Key West, Florida. The Virginius Affair had caused a war scare between the United States and Spain, and Wabash headed for Florida in case the Navy needed ships to invade Cuba. Wabash arrived in Key West on January 3, 1874. She never left port again, and was decommissioned on April 25, 1874.

Admiral Case's flag was transferred to the USS Franklin, and Franklin won the Navy's permission to command the vessel and resume his Mediterranean duties. When Admiral Case retired, Franklin was named chief of staff to his successor, Rear Admiral John Lorimer Worden. Franklin had been decommissioned in 1871, but was recommissioned on December 15, 1873. Franklin departed Key West on April 11, 1874, and after an uneventful tour of duty she sailed for Norfolk, arriving on September 14, 1876.

=== Shore duties ===
After a brief tenure as the executive officer of the Gosport Naval Yard in Norfolk, Virginia, during which time he was president of the Board for Promotion of Officers, Franklin spent similarly short periods of time as the executive officer of the New London Naval Station and then the Washington Navy Yard. In 1877, he was assigned as a hydrographer to the United States Hydrographic Office, and on June 1, 1878, was appointed by the president of the United States to a one-year term on the board of visitors of the United States Military Academy at West Point, New York. (He spent the last six months of 1880 on leave.)

At the end of 1880, Franklin was assigned to special duty in the Bureau of Equipment in the Navy Department. He was promoted to commodore on May 28, 1881, and in 1882 appointed to the board of visitors of the United States Naval Academy at Annapolis. He was named the board's president in June. On June 16, 1883, he was appointed president of the Board of Examiners again. His duty station changed when in February 1884 he was appointed superintendent of the Naval Observatory in Washington, D.C.

=== Final duties ===
Franklin now had just three and a half years of service remaining before retirement, and fully expected to serve out his remaining years at the Naval Observatory. But on January 24, 1885, he was promoted to rear admiral, and from May 7 to May 28, 1885, he served as commander-in-chief of the U.S. Navy's Training Squadron, with his flagship aboard the USS Pensacola. The following month he was named commander-in-chief of the European Squadron. He assumed his duties on June 10, 1885, serving aboard the Pensacola until his retirement in August 1887.

Franklin retired from the navy on August 24, 1887, at the age of 62. According to maritime historian Hans Van Tilburg, throughout his career Franklin was well liked and competent. But he was prone to sloth.

== Personal life ==
Likely sometime between 1860 and 1865, Franklin married Mathilde Atocha. Originally from New Orleans, Mathilde was the daughter of Alexander Jose Atocha, a Spaniard who helped negotiate the treaty of Guadalupe Hidalgo, and Eliza Atocha. Franklin and Mathilde had one son, Walter Franklin, who died on September 19, 1867. Mathilde died one year later, in 1868, from an unspecified illness. A California record of her death stated that "Mrs. Franklin, an invalid, with their only child joined her husband on the coast 12 months since. Soon after residence at Mare Island where her husband was stationed, their only child died. She did not recover from the shock. As progress of disease left little hope for recovery, Captain Franklin sailed for New York 2 months since. Mrs. Franklin died 18 days after their arrival."

On March 4, 1871, Franklin married Caroline Maria Keyes, daughter of Major General Erasmus D. Keyes. The pair remained married until Caroline's death in 1881 from Bright's Disease.

On January 10, 1883, Franklin married Marion Sands, daughter of Rear Admiral Benjamin F. and Helen M. (née French) Sands. Her maternal uncle was United States Army General William H. French. Marion had previously been married to Arthur Henry Dutton, a U.S. Army engineer and brevet brigadier general who died in battle in 1864.

The Franklins never had children. Mrs. Franklin had a son, Arthur Henry Dutton, Jr., (born in 1864) from her previous marriage.

Franklin converted to Roman Catholicism in 1880.

== Retirement and death ==
Franklin lived in Washington, D.C., in retirement. He joined the Metropolitan Club, the Sons of the Revolution, (Note: Franklin co-founded the District of Columbia chapter on March 11, 1889.) the Washington Monument Society, the Memorial Society of the City of Washington, the Society of Foreign Wars, the Society of the Cincinnati, the Pennsylvania Military Order, and the Chevy Chase Club.

In February 1889, President Grover Cleveland appointed Franklin a member of the U.S. delegation to the International Marine Conference. (Note: The conference's main goal was to determine an internationally agreed-upon set of "rules of the road" for ships as they navigated oceans, shipping lanes, harbors, and ports. Its mandate also included the establishment of a uniform system of visual signals and codes, a uniform system of buoys (based on color and shape), and methods for handling collisions at sea.) When the conference met in Washington in October, Franklin was appointed its president on October 16. Franklin later sued the United States government over his remuneration for this event. The U.S. law establishing the conference allowed salaried military officers to be paid their expenses, but nothing more. Other delegates received $5,000 ($193,500 in 2025 dollars). Franklin sued to gain his $5,000, but the United States Court of Claims held that his Navy pension qualified as salary, and denied relief.

In 1898, Franklin authored a memoir, Memories of a Rear-Admiral Who Has Served for More Than Half a Century in the Navy of the United States.

After several weeks of illness, Samuel Rhoads Franklin died at his home in Washington, D.C., on February 24, 1909, of chronic kidney failure. His funeral was held at the Cathedral of St. Matthew the Apostle, and he was buried at Arlington National Cemetery.

== Bibliography ==
- Benjamin, Marcus; Strickland, Reeves T.; Light, Charles P. (1920). The Society of the Sons of the Revolution in the District of Columbia. Washington, D.C.: Society of the Sons of the Revolution. hdl:2027/loc.ark:/13960/t2j67tj80.
- Browning, Robert M. Jr. (2014). Lincoln's Trident: The West Gulf Blockading Squadron During the Civil War. Tuscaloosa, Fla.: University of Alabama Press. ISBN 9780817318468.
- Commemorative Biographical Record of Hartford County, Connecticut: Containing Biographical Sketches of Prominent and Representative Citizens, and of Many of the Early Settled Families. Chicago: J.H. Beers & Co. 1901. p. 2. "Walter S. Franklin clerk House Samuel William."
- Committee on Pensions (May 28, 1912). Pensions and Increase of Pensions for Certain Soldiers and Sailors of the Regular Army and Navy, Etc. S.Rept. 808. United States Senate. 62d Cong., 2d sess (Report). Washington, D.C.: Government Printing Office.
- Conway, J.D. (2003). Monterey: Presidio, Pueblo and Port. Charleston, S.C.: Arcadia Publishing. ISBN 9780738524238.
- Franklin, Samuel Rhoads (1898). Memories of a Rear-Admiral Who Has Served for More Than Half a Century in the Navy of the United States. New York: Harper & Brothers.
- Gleaves, Albert (March 1913). "An Officer of the Old Navy: Rear-Admiral Charles Steedman, U.S.N. (1811–1890)". In Earle, Ralph (ed.). Proceedings of the United States Naval Institute. Annapolis, Md.: U.S. Naval Institute.
- Gratwick, Harry (2011). Mainers in the Civil War. Charleston, S.C.: History Press. ISBN 9781596299627.
- Greene, Jack; Massignani, Alessandro (1998). Ironclads at War: The Origin and Development of the Armored Warship, 1854–1891. Cambridge, Mass.: Da Capo Press. ISBN 9780585112787.
- Hall, Clifford J.; Lehn, John P. (1920). York County and the World War: Being a War History of York and York County and a Record of the Services Rendered to Their Country by the People of this Community. York, Pa.: C.J. Hall and J.P. Lehn.
- Hamersly, Lewis Randolph (1890). The Records of Living Officers of the U.S. Navy and Marine Corps. Philadelphia: L.R. Hamersly & Co.
- Heim, Joseph (2013). "Drayton, Percival". In Tucker, Spencer; Arnold, James R.; Wiener, Roberta; Pierpaoli, Paul G. Jr.; Coffey, David (eds.). American Civil War: The Definitive Encyclopedia and Document Collection. Santa Barbara, Calif.: ABC-CLIO. ISBN 9781851096824.
- Janin, Hunt; Carlson, Ursula (2015). The California Campaigns of the U.S.-Mexican War, 1846–1848. Jefferson, N.C.: McFarland & Co. ISBN 9781476620930.
- Konstam, Angus (2002). Hampton Roads 1862: First Clash of the Ironclads. Oxford, U.K.: Osprey. ISBN 9781841764108.
- Konstam, Angus (2002). Union Monitor, 1861–65. Oxford, U.K.: Osprey. ISBN 9781841763064.
- Miller, David W. (2000). Second Only to Grant: Quartermaster General Montgomery C. Meigs. Shippensburg, Pa.: White Maine Books. ISBN 9781572492127.
- Naval History Bureau (1970). Dictionary of American Naval Fighting Ships. Volume IV. Washington, D.C.: U.S. Government Printing Office. ISBN 9780160020193.
- "Navy, U.S., Operations of". The American Annual Cyclopedia and Register of Important Events. New York: D. Appleton & Co. 1863.
- Nott, Charles C.; Hopkins, Archibald (1890). Cases Decided in the Court of Claims of the United States, at the Term of 1893–94. Washington, D.C.: W.H. & O.H. Morrison.
- Page, Dave (1994). Ships Versus Shore: Civil War Engagements Along Southern Shores and Rivers. Nashville, Tenn.: Rutledge Hill Press. ISBN 9781558532670.
- Powell, William H.; Shippen, Edward (1892). Officers of the Army and Navy, Regular, Who Served in the Civil War. Philadelphia: Hamersly. p. 156. "Samuel R. Franklin surrender Mobile."
- Prowell, George Reeser (1907). History of York County, Pennsylvania. Chicago: J.H. Beers.
- Quarstein, John V. (2006). A History of Ironclads: The Power of Iron Over Wood. Charleston, S.C.: History Press. ISBN 9781596291188.
- Quarstein, John V. (2006). "Sink Before Surrender: The Story of the CSS Virginia". In Holzer, Harold (ed.). The Battle of Hampton Roads: New Perspectives on the 'USS Monitor' and 'CSS Virginia'. New York: Fordham University Press. ISBN 9780823224807.
- Silverstone, Paul H. (2006). Civil War Navies, 1855–1883. New York: Routledge. ISBN 9780415978705.
- Snell, Mark A. (2002). From First to Last: The Life of Major General William B. Franklin. New York: Fordham University Press. ISBN 9780823221486.
- Stewart, Charles W., ed. (1906). Official Records of the Union and Confederate Navies in the War of the Rebellion. Series 1, Volume 21. West Gulf Blockading Squadron. January 1 to December 31, 1864. Washington, D.C.: U.S. Government Printing Office.
- Van Tilburg, Hans Van (2010). A Civil War Gunboat in Pacific Waters: Life On Board 'USS Saginaw'. Gainesville, Fla.: University Press of Florida. ISBN 9780813035161.
- Tucker, Spencer, ed. (2009). "Virginius Affair". The Encyclopedia of the Spanish-American and Philippine-American Wars: A Political, Social, and Military History. Santa Barbara, Calif.: ABC-CLIO. ISBN 9781851099511.
- Tucker, Spencer (2011). "Palmer, James Shedden". In Tucker, Spencer; Pierpaoli, Paul G. Jr.; White, William E. (eds.). The Civil War Naval Encyclopedia. Santa Barbara, Calif.: ABC-CLIO. ISBN 9781598843385.
- United States Catholic Historical Society (1911). Historical Records and Studies. Part I, Volume VI. New York: United States Catholic Historical Society.
- United States Military Academy (June 1878). Report of the Board of Visitors of the United States Military Academy at West Point, June, 1878 (Report). Washington, D.C.: Government Printing Office.
- United States Navy (1865). Register of the Commissioned, Warrant, and Volunteer Officers of the Navy of the United States, Including Officers of the Marine Corps and Others, to January 1, 1865. Washington, D.C.: Government Printing Office.
- Wasserman, Mark (2000). Everyday Life and Politics in Nineteenth Century Mexico: Men, Women, and War. Albuquerque, N.M.: University of New Mexico Press. ISBN 9780826321718.
