= Alexander C. M. Pennington =

Alexander C. M. Pennington may refer to:

- Alexander C. M. Pennington (politician) (1810–1867), U.S. representative from New Jersey
- Alexander C. M. Pennington (general) (1838–1917), United States Army officer who served in the American Civil War and Spanish-American War, son of the above
