= Alexander C. M. Pennington (politician) =

American politician

Alexander Cummings McWhorter Pennington
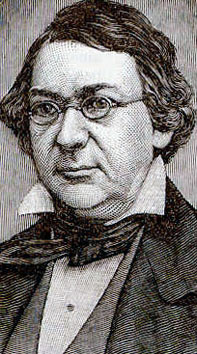

Member of the U.S. House of Representatives from New Jersey's 5th district
- In office March 4, 1853 – March 3, 1857
- Preceded by: Rodman M. Price
- Succeeded by: Jacob R. Wortendyke

Member of the New Jersey General Assembly
- In office 1837-1838

Personal details
- Born: July 2, 1810 Newark, New Jersey, US
- Died: January 25, 1867 (aged 56) New York City, US
- Party: Whig
- Spouse: Ann Johnston Kennedy Pennington (m. February 11, 1836)
- Profession: Politician

Alexander Cummings McWhorter Pennington Sr. (July 2, 1810, Newark, New Jersey – January 25, 1867, New York City) was an American Whig Party politician who represented New Jersey's 5th congressional district in the United States House of Representatives from 1853 to 1857.

== Biography ==
Born in Newark, New Jersey, July 2, 1810, he attended the United States Military Academy, West Point, New York, from 1826 to 1828. He went on to study law, was admitted to the bar in 1833, and commenced practice in Newark. He was elected a member of the New Jersey General Assembly in 1837 and 1838. He served as alderman of Newark from 1837 to 1840.

Pennington was elected as a Whig to the Thirty-third Congress and reelected to the Thirty-fourth Congress, serving in Congress from March 4, 1853, to March 3, 1857. He served as chairman of the Committee on Foreign Affairs in the Thirty-fourth Congress.

After leaving the Congress, he moved to New York City, where he died January 25, 1867.

== Family ==
He was a grand nephew of 6th Governor of New Jersey William Sandford Pennington, and a cousin of 13th New Jersey Governor and 27th Speaker of the U.S. House of Representatives William Pennington. His son, Alexander Cummings McWhorter Pennington, Jr., was a brigadier general in the United States Army and veteran of both the American Civil War and Spanish–American War.

U.S. House of Representatives
Preceded by Rodman M. Price	Member of the U.S. House of Representatives from New Jersey's 5th congressional district March 4, 1853 – March 3, 1857	Succeeded by Jacob R. Wortendyke
