= Jacob R. Wortendyke =

American politician (1818-1868)

Jacob Reynier Wortendyke
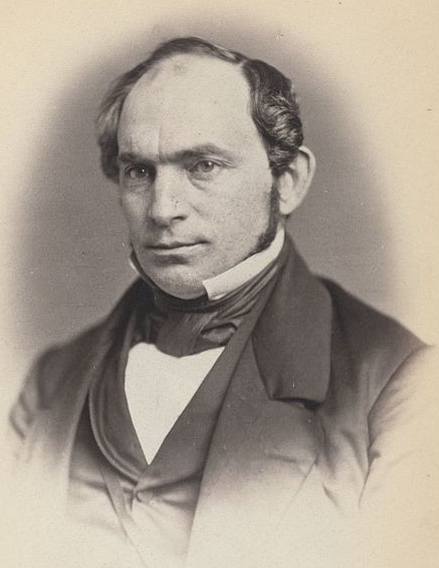

Member of the U.S. House of Representatives from New Jersey's 5th district
- In office March 4, 1857 – March 3, 1859
- Preceded by: Alexander C.M. Pennington
- Succeeded by: William Pennington

Personal details
- Born: November 27, 1818 Chestnut Ridge, New Jersey, US
- Died: November 7, 1868 (aged 49) Jersey City, New Jersey, US
- Party: Democratic
- Profession: Politician

Jacob Reynier Wortendyke (November 27, 1818 – November 7, 1868) was an American Democratic Party politician who represented New Jersey's 5th congressional district in the United States House of Representatives from 1857 to 1859.

Wortendyke was born in Chestnut Ridge, New Jersey (in present-day Montvale) on November 27, 1818. He completed preparatory studies under a private tutor, and graduated from Rutgers College in 1839. He taught school for ten years. He studied law, was admitted to the bar in 1853 and commenced practice in Jersey City, New Jersey.

Wortendyke was elected as a Democrat to the Thirty-fifth Congress, serving in office from March 4, 1857 to March 3, 1859, but was an unsuccessful candidate for reelection in 1858 to the Thirty-sixth Congress.

After leaving congress, he resumed the practice of law. He was a trustee of Rutgers College from 1862 to 1868, and was president of the Jersey City water board from 1860 to 1868. He was president of the Riparian Commission of New Jersey from 1865 to 1868, and was a delegate to the 1868 Democratic National Convention. He died in Jersey City on November 7, 1868, and was interred in the Dutch Reformed Church Cemetery in Park Ridge, New Jersey.

The Jacob Wortendyke House in Woodcliff Lake, New Jersey, has been listed on the National Register of Historic Places since 1983 (as Reference #: 83001593).

U.S. House of Representatives
Preceded by Alexander C. M. Pennington	Member of the U.S. House of Representatives from New Jersey's 5th congressional district March 4, 1857 – March 3, 1859	Succeeded by William Pennington
