= South Trimble =

American politician (1864–1946)

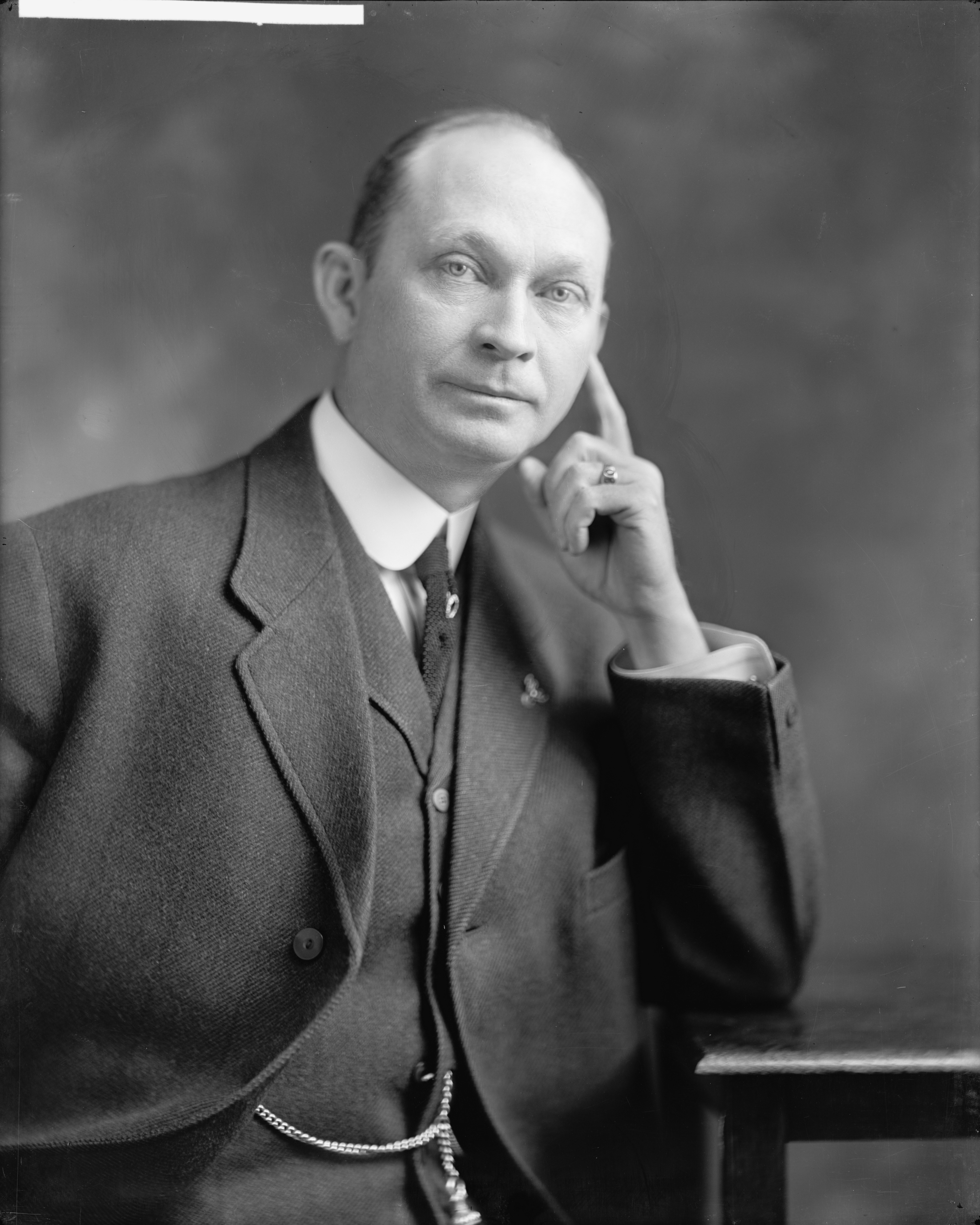

27th and 29th Clerk of the United States House of Representatives
- In office April 4, 1911 – May 18, 1919; December 7, 1931 – November 23, 1946
- Speaker: Champ Clark (1911-1919) John Nance Garner Henry T. Rainey Jo Byrns William B. Bankhead Sam Rayburn (1931-1946)
- Preceded by: Alexander McDowell; William Tyler Page
- Succeeded by: William Tyler Page; Harry Newlin Megill

Member of the U.S. House of Representatives from Kentucky's 7th district
- In office March 4, 1901 – March 3, 1907
- Preceded by: June Ward Gayle
- Succeeded by: William P. Kimball

Member of the Kentucky House of Representatives
- In office 1898–1900

Personal details
- Born: April 13, 1864 Wolfe County, Kentucky, U.S.
- Died: November 23, 1946 (aged 82) Washington, D.C., U.S.
- Resting place: Frankfort Cemetery
- Party: Democratic
- Occupation: Farmer; politician

South Trimble (April 13, 1864 – November 23, 1946) was a U.S. representative from Kentucky. He was a prominent member of the famed South–Cockrell–Hargis family of Southern politicians.

== Biography ==
Born near Hazel Green, Kentucky, to Asberry Trimble who was killed by his brother in law, Edward Hensley as he was putting his slaves to work at the Trimble Tannery during the American Civil War on October 15, 1864. Trimble's mother bought and moved to a Franklin County, Kentucky home where he attended the public schools of Frankfort and Excelsior Institute.

He engaged in agricultural pursuits near Frankfort, Kentucky, including turkey farming. In 1913, Trimble became the second person to present a turkey to the President of the United States, hoping to break the 40-year monopoly that Horace Vose, the Westerly, Rhode Island turkey farmer who had provided the President's turkeys since 1873, had on the practice. Trimble was insistent that his turkeys, though smaller than Vose's, were more flavorful due to more red pepper in their diets. No record exists of whether or not Trimble or Vose won out, but Vose's death later in 1913 ensured a heated rivalry over the ensuing decades for the honors that was not settled until the National Turkey Federation took over in 1947.

He served as a member of the Kentucky House of Representatives 1898-1900 and as Speaker in 1900, and was "married November 24, 1885, to Miss Carrie Bell Allan, of Galveston, Tex."

Trimble was elected as a Democrat to the Fifty-seventh, Fifty-eighth, and Fifty-ninth Congresses (March 4, 1901 – March 3, 1907). He did not seek renomination in 1906, and was an unsuccessful Democratic candidate for Lieutenant Governor of Kentucky. He was Clerk of the United States House of Representatives, first, from April 4, 1911, to May 18, 1919.

He retired from public life and operated a plantation near Selma, Alabama.

He again served as Clerk of the House of Representatives from December 7, 1931, until his death in Washington, D.C., November 23, 1946. He was interred in Frankfort Cemetery, Frankfort, Kentucky.

U.S. House of Representatives
Preceded by June W. Gayle	Member of the U.S. House of Representatives from Kentucky's 7th congressional district 1901–1907	Succeeded by William P. Kimball
Government offices
Preceded by Alexander McDowell	Clerk of the United States House of Representatives; 1911–1919	Succeeded by William Tyler Page
Preceded by William Tyler Page	Clerk of the United States House of Representatives; 1931–1946	Succeeded by Harry Newlin Megill
