= American Creed =

Idea of an unifying political belief of Americans

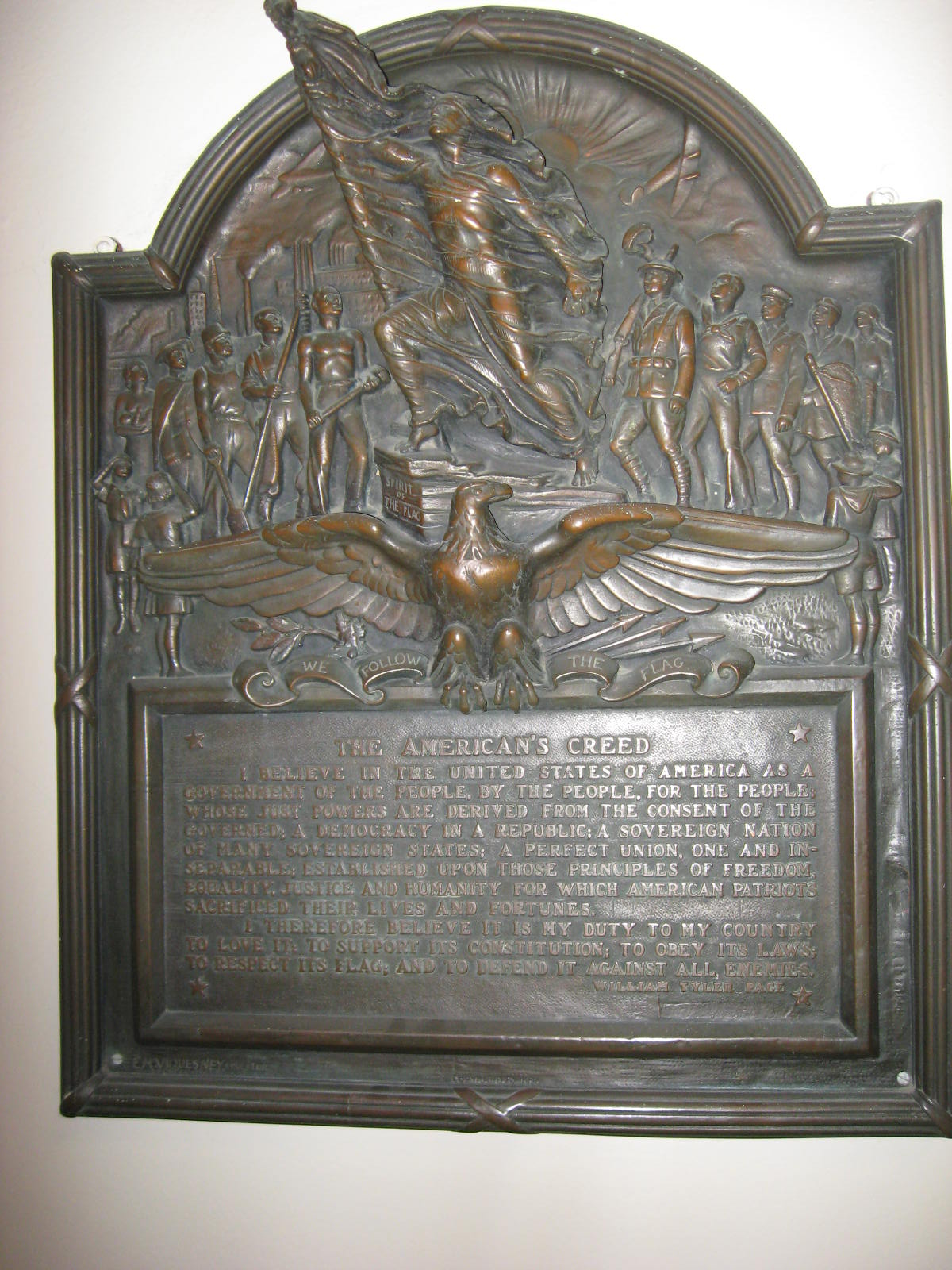
"The American's Creed" hung in Butler University's Jordan Hall

"The American's Creed" is the title of a resolution passed by the U.S. House of Representatives on April 3, 1918. It is a statement written in 1917 by William Tyler Page as an entry into a patriotic contest that he won.

I believe in the United States of America, as a government of the people, by the people, for the people; whose just powers are derived from the consent of the governed; a democracy in a republic; a sovereign Nation of many sovereign States; a perfect union, one and inseparable; established upon those principles of freedom, equality, justice, and humanity for which American patriots sacrificed their lives and fortunes. I therefore believe it is my duty to my country to love it, to support its Constitution, to obey its laws, to respect its flag, and to defend it against all enemies.

— William Tyler Page, The American's Creed,

== See also ==
- List of U.S. national symbols
- American civil religion
- American exceptionalism
- American nationalism
- Americanism (ideology)
