= Walter S. Franklin (politician) =

American lawyer

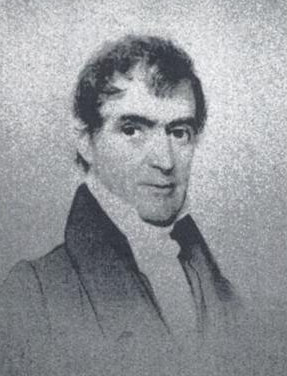
Portrait

Walter Simonds Franklin (November 6, 1799 – September 20, 1838) was a lawyer who practiced in Pennsylvania. He served as the seventh Clerk of the United States House of Representatives, from 1833 until his death in 1838.

== Personal life ==
=== Ancestry ===
Franklin's parents were Samuel Rhoades Franklin and Sarah Simonds. His father was the son of Mary Rhoades, a daughter of Samuel Rhoades, who had been a member of the First Continental Congress. His father's brother, Walter Franklin was a prominent Pennsylvania lawyer, later state Attorney General and state judge.

=== Early life ===
Franklin was born in New York, the only surviving child of his parents. As a teenager, he moved to Lancaster, Pennsylvania to live with his uncle and namesake. Walter attended Litchfield Law School in Connecticut, where he met and, in 1821, married Sarah Buel. They moved to York, Pennsylvania, where Franklin practiced law.

=== Children ===
The Franklins had six children.

Their eldest was William Buel, who was a major general in the Union Army during the American Civil War, and post-bellum was a civil engineer. Their second child was Samuel Rhoads, a rear admiral in the U. S. Navy, before, during, and after the Civil War. Their third child was Thomas, "apparently the black sheep of the family." Their fourth child was Anne, who died, apparently, in childbirth. Their fifth child was Frederick Buel, who died in his twenties. Their sixth child was named the same as his father, Walter Simonds. He attended Harvard, served in the Union Army as a brevet lieutenant colonel, and post-bellum was a civil engineer and businessman.

The summer before his death, Franklin wrote to Secretary of War Joel Poinsett requesting that his eldest son, then 15, be admitted to West Point the following summer. Poinsett refused. Franklin's sudden death that fall left the family almost penniless. At this point, Senator James Buchanan, a family friend, intervened, and convinced Poinsett to reverse his decision.

== Career ==
Franklin was named as Clerk for the Twenty-third United States Congress on December 2, 1833, and served for the next two congresses, dying in office of a sudden "malignant fever". He was the third Pennsylvanian to hold the post.

Government offices
Preceded by Matthew St. Clair Clarke	Clerk of the United States House of Representatives; 1833–1838	Succeeded by Hugh A. Garland
