= Lyman Decatur Norris =

American lawyer (1823–1894)

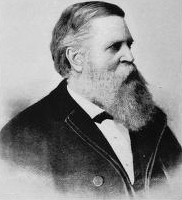
Lyman D. Norris

Lyman Decatur Norris (May 4, 1823 to January 6, 1894) was a lawyer, member of the Michigan Constitutional Convention of 1867, and a State Senator from Washtenaw County, Michigan from 1869 to 1871. He was involved in Dred Scott Case when it was argued in St. Louis Circuit Court.

== Early life ==
He was born in Covington, New York to Mark Norris (1796–1862), a businessman, mason, and an anti-slavery Whig, and Roccena B. Vaill (1797–1876). In 1828 Mark Norris relocated his family to Ypsilanti, Michigan. In 1841 Lyman Norris enrolled at the University of Michigan. He transferred to Yale University after three years and received a law degree. Norris read law with Alexander D. Fraser in Detroit and was admitted to the Bar in Michigan in 1847.

== Career ==
In 1848–1853, Lyman Norris practiced law in St. Louis, Missouri, where he became engaged in politics as Democrat. He co-owned and served as political editor of the St. Louis Daily Times.

In 1849, Norris and Hugh A. Garland represented pro-slavery client in the Missouri's Dred Scott Case, Scott v. Emerson, 15 Mo. 576 (1852). They were successful in arguing that Dred Scott's free-soil residence did not entitle him to sue for freedom. Oddly, Lyman Norris offered Dred Scott a loan to purchase freedom.

In 1854, Norris returned to Ypsilanti, Michigan. In 1867 Norris attended the Michigan Constitutional Convention. In 1871 he moved to Grand Rapids, Michigan. He ran as a candidate for the Michigan Supreme Court in 1875. He was appointed a Regent of the University of Michigan in 1883. He died at Grand Rapids on January 6, 1894.

== Family ==
In 1854 Lyman Norris married Lucy Alsop Whittelsey from Middletown, Connecticut. Mark Norris (1857–1943) and Maria W. Norris (1858–1938) were their surviving children; Mark Norris became a lawyer and Maria Norris became a physician.
