= United States House of Representatives Library =

Library of the United States House of Representatives

- 38°53′13″N 77°00′25″W
- Location: Washington, D.C., United States
- Type: Law library
- Established: 1792
- Reference to legal mandate
- Branch of: Legislative Resource Center

Other information
- Website: https://clerk.house.gov/About#LRCDetails

The United States House of Representatives Library (the House Library) is the library of the United States House of Representatives. The House Library is a division of the Legislative Resource Center, which is part of Office of the Clerk of the United States House of Representatives. The Library is located in the Cannon House Office Building.

The House Library is a legislative, law, and general reference library serving House Members and staff. The House Library has been the official repository of the House of Representatives and the Office of the Clerk since 1792.

== History ==
The first acquisition for the House Library occurred in 1792, when Congress directed the Clerk of the House to purchase reference materials "for the use of the House." In 1826, the House Library was directed to maintain two copies of all House publications; this mandate was later incorporated into the House Rules and is still in place today.

From its creation until 1922, the Library was located in various rooms throughout the United States Capitol before it was moved to the newly built Cannon House Office Building in 1922. In addition to its main office, from 1858 to 1989, the House Library also maintained a reference room adjacent to the House Floor for the use of House Members.

In 1995, the House Library became part of the newly created Legislative Resource Center (LRC), a division of the Office of the Clerk dedicated to making House information available to the public. The Library opened a new reading room available to congressional Members and staff in 2013.

== Collection and services ==
The House Library's collection contains legislative, legal, historical, news, and general reference materials. The Library maintains a print collection of approximately 200,000 volumes dating from 1789 to the present. The collection includes the Congressional Record, House bills and resolutions, House committee hearings and prints, the United States Congressional Serial Set, the Statutes at Large, the United States Code, and many other resources related to the House, its activities, and its Members. In addition to its print collection, the Library subscribes to a number of databases to increase the speed with which users can access the information they need.

The House Library serves present and former Representatives, congressional staff in DC and district offices, House leadership, and officers.

== See also ==
- National Technical Reports Library
