= W. Pat Jennings =

American politician (1919–1994)

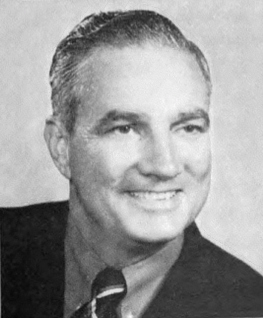

28th Clerk of the United States House of Representatives
- In office January 10, 1967 – November 15, 1975
- Speaker: John W. McCormack Carl Albert
- Preceded by: Ralph R. Roberts
- Succeeded by: Edmund L. Henshaw Jr.

Member of the U.S. House of Representatives from Virginia's 9th district
- In office January 3, 1955 – January 3, 1967
- Preceded by: William C. Wampler
- Succeeded by: William C. Wampler

Personal details
- Born: William Pat Jennings; August 20, 1919 Smyth County, Virginia, U.S.
- Died: August 2, 1994 (aged 74) Marion, Virginia, U.S.
- Party: Democratic
- Spouse: Ann Cox Jennings
- Children: 4, including G. C.
- Education: Virginia Tech (BS)

Military service
- Branch/service: United States Army
- Years of service: 1941–1946
- Rank: Major
- Battles/wars: World War II

William Pat Jennings (August 20, 1919 – August 2, 1994) (nicknamed "Pat Jennings") was an American businessman, World War II veteran and liberal politician aligned with the Democratic Party who served six terms as a United States representative from Virginia from Virginia's 9th congressional district (1955 to 1967).

== Early and family life ==
Jennings was born on a farm in Camp in Smyth County, Virginia. Since his father (Grover Jennings) was a fireman on the railroad and often away from home, he was raised by his mother (Akie, who became a rural mail carrier during the Great Depression) and maternal grandmother (a laundress) in the county's St. Clair area. Educated in the local public schools, Jennings earned a B.S. degree from the Virginia Polytechnic Institute in Blacksburg in 1941.

== Military service ==
As the United States became involved in World War II, Jennings enlisted in the United States Army for two years beginning in July 1941. He initially served in the European Theater of Operations for two and a half years, rising in rank with the Twenty-ninth Infantry from platoon leader to company commander, then operations officer. Jennings then became an instructor for the Reserve Officers' Training Corps at the University of Illinois. In May 1946, he was discharged with the rank of major.

== Businessman ==
Jennings owned an automobile and farm implement and supply business in Marion, Virginia (the Smyth County seat), from 1946 until his death. Later a lobbyist for coal slurry pipelines, Jennings also served on the Board of Visitors for his Virginia Tech alma mater.

== Politician ==
Jennings won his first election in 1947, becoming sheriff of Smyth County, Virginia, the first Democrat elected to that office in four decades. Reelected in 1951, he was known for wearing his uniform (unlike several predecessors), and served until 1954.

He first ran for election to the U.S. House of Representatives for Virginia's 9th congressional district in 1952, but lost in the Democratic Party primary to M.M. Long, Sr., who in turn lost to Republican incumbent William C. Wampler . Two years later Jennings defeated Wampler and won re-election four times. Thus he served in the Eighty-fourth Congress and five succeeding Congresses (January 3, 1955 – January 3, 1967). Initially elected in turmoil following the Supreme Court's initial decision in Brown v. Board of Education, Jennings would sign the 1956 Southern Manifesto that opposed the desegregation of public schools following the Supreme Court's second Brown decision. He also voted against the Civil Rights Acts of 1957, 1960, and 1964, However, Jennings (who with Edgar Bacon constituted the liberal wing of the state's Democratic party) came to align with President Lyndon B. Johnson (as would former Byrd stalwart Sydney Kellam, who became Johnson's campaign manager for Virginia), and voted in favor of the Voting Rights Act of 1965.

In 1966, journalist Drew Pearson reported that Jennings was one of a group of four Congressmen who had received the "Statesman of the Republic" award from Liberty Lobby for their "right-wing activities". However, that endorsement failed to win Jennings reelection in 1966 to the Ninetieth Congress. Instead, Republican William C. Wampler recaptured the seat. Jennings also served among Virginia's delegates to the Democratic National Convention in 1952, 1956, 1960, and 1968.

== Clerk of the U.S. House ==
His former colleagues elected Jennings as Clerk of the House of Representatives for the Ninetieth Congress. He was reelected to the four succeeding Congresses, and served from January 10, 1967, until resigning on November 15, 1975.

== Personal life ==
He married Annabel Cox and the couple had three sons (Grover, William Jr. and Richard) and a daughter.

== Death ==
On August 2, 1994, the tractor he was using to mow the back lawn of his store overturned, causing severe injuries. He died at the local hospital. Two years earlier, his eldest son, G.C. Jennings, who had graduated from the segregated high school in 1958, then attended Virginia Tech and the University of Richmond Law School began his political career, representing Smyth County in the House of Delegates.

U.S. House of Representatives
Preceded by William C. Wampler	Member of the U.S. House of Representatives from Virginia's 9th congressional district 1955–1967	Succeeded by William C. Wampler
Government offices
Preceded by Ralph R. Roberts	28th Clerk of the United States House of Representatives; 1967–1975	Succeeded by Edmund L. Henshaw Jr.
