= Ralph R. Roberts =

American politician, Clerk of House of Representatives (1897–1981)

President John F. Kennedy delivers his annual address to the Congress on the State of the Union. Vice President Lyndon B. Johnson and Speaker of the House of Representatives John W. McCormack sit behind President Kennedy; Clerk of the House of Representatives Ralph R. Roberts sits at right

Ralph Ridpath Roberts (October 16, 1897 – December 23, 1981) was the Doorkeeper of the United States House of Representatives from c. 1943 until 1947, a period covering the latter portion of the 78th United States Congress and the entire of the 79th, and was Clerk of the United States House of Representatives from 1949 until 1953 and again from 1955 until 1967. Roberts, who was born in Indiana, served the 81st, 82nd, 84th, 85th, 86th, 87th, 88th and 89th United States Congresses. Roberts died on December 23, 1981, at the age of 84.

Government offices
| Preceded by John Andrews | Clerk of the United States House of Representatives; 1949–1953 | Succeeded by Lyle Snader |
| Preceded by Lyle Snader | Clerk of the United States House of Representatives; 1955–1967 | Succeeded by W. Pat Jennings |
