= William Tyler Page =

Clerk of U.S. House of Representatives (1868–1942)

28th Clerk of the United States House of Representatives
- In office May 18, 1919 – December 7, 1931
- Speaker: Frederick H. Gillett Nicholas Longworth
- Preceded by: South Trimble
- Succeeded by: South Trimble

Personal details
- Born: 1868 Frederick, Maryland, U.S.
- Died: October 19, 1942 (aged 73–74) Washington, D.C., U.S.
- Resting place: Oak Hill Cemetery
- Spouse: Mary Anna Weigangt (m. 1895; died 1929)
- Children: 5
- Relatives: Carter Braxton (great-great-grandfather)

William Tyler Page (1868 – October 19, 1942) was an American public servant. He worked on the United States Capitol in Washington, D.C., for 61 years, first as a page boy and later as a clerk of the United States House of Representatives. He was the author of American Creed and Story of Nation’s Capital.

== Early life ==
Page was born in 1868 in Frederick, Frederick County, Maryland. He was the great-great-grandson of Carter Braxton, (1736–1797), a member of the House of Burgesses of the Province of Virginia. He was also a descendant of President John Tyler.

Page began working "twelve hours a day in a printing shop and paper-bag factory" at the age of 10.

== Career ==
Page began working as a page boy for the United States House of Representatives in Washington, D.C., on December 19, 1881, and he became a clerk in 1919. Page worked for the Capitol for 61 years in total.

In 1917, at 49, Page wrote "The American's Creed," as a submission to a nationwide patriotic contest suggested by Henry Sterling Chapin, of New York, which was inspired by a fervor at the beginning of the American entry into the First World War. The goal was to have a concise but complete statement of American political faith. Inspired by thoughts on his way home from church in May 1917, having just recited the Apostles' Creed used in most Christian churches as a statement of belief, Page drew on a wide variety of historical documents and speeches, including the U.S. Declaration of Independence, the Preamble to the US Constitution, Abraham Lincoln's Gettysburg Address, a speech made by Daniel Webster, and text from Edward Everett Hale's 1863 patriotic short story of a military officer condemned to exile, "The Man Without a Country." He proceeded to craft a simple but moving expression of American patriotism.

His submission was chosen in March 1918 over more than 3000 other entries. On April 3, 1918, it was accepted by the House Speaker of the United States House of Representatives, and the US Commissioner of Education (then part of the US Department of the Interior) on behalf of the American people, according to the "Congressional Record", No. 102, April 13, 1918. A prize of $1000 was also awarded by Mayor James H. Preston on behalf of the City of Baltimore, which was the birthplace of the national anthem. Page used it to purchase Liberty Bonds for the war effort and donated them to his church. Today, it also often comprises part of the naturalization ceremony to swear in new American citizens, along with other patriotic symbols, such as the Pledge of Allegiance to the American flag and the singing of various songs and anthems.

=== Clerk of House of Representatives ===
In 1919, the year after the war ended, Page was elected Clerk of the House of Representatives from the 66th United States Congress, and held that office until the 71st Congress ended in 1931. The majority in power in the 1920s was the Republican Party. Later, he was Emeritus Minority Clerk, for the remainder of his life. He was highly respected by members of both major parties throughout his service, as a principled gentleman whose patriotism was inspirational and whose love of America was unquestioned.

William Tyler Page pledging allegiance to the flag

Page died 11 years later, during the first year of America's involvement in the Second World War, on October 19, 1942, after serving his country his entire adult life humbly but always proudly. The House of Representatives adjourned the following day in his honor.

For many years, Page also served as the President General of the United States Flag Association. Two days before his death, he gave an address to the Daughters of the American Revolution on the Golden Anniversary of the writing of the Pledge of Allegiance to the American Flag (1892).

=== American's Creed ===
The American's Creed is as follows:

I believe in the United States of America as a government of the people, by the people, for the people; whose just powers are derived from the consent of the governed; a democracy in a republic; a sovereign Nation of many sovereign States; a perfect union, one and inseparable; established upon those principles of freedom, equality, justice, and humanity for which American patriots sacrificed their lives and fortunes.

I therefore believe it is my duty to my country to love it, to support its Constitution, to obey its laws, to respect its flag, and to defend it against all enemies.

Page once said:

The American's Creed is a summing up, in one hundred words, of the basic principles of American political faith. It is not an expression of individual opinion upon the obligations and duties of American citizenship or with respect to its rights and privileges. It is a summary of the fundamental principles of American political faith as set forth in its greatest documents, its worthiest traditions and by its greatest leaders.

== Personal life, death and legacy ==
Page resided in Friendship Heights, Maryland (in Montgomery County). Page married Mary Anna Weigangt of Athens, Georgia, daughter of painter Charles H. Weigangt, in 1895. They had three daughters and two sons: Nannie Tyler, Mary, Mrs. Gordon F. Fox, John C. and William Tyler. His wife died in 1929.

Page died of heart disease on October 19, 1942, in Washington, D.C., at age 74. He was buried in the Oak Hill Cemetery. In 1955, the Daughters of the American Revolution added a bronze plaque on his grave at Oak Hill Cemetery.

William Tyler Page Elementary School is located at 13400 Tamarack Road in Silver Spring, Maryland, and it is part of Montgomery County Public Schools.

== See also ==
- American Flag
- Flag Day (United States)
- Sons of the American Revolution

Government offices
Preceded by South Trimble	Clerk of the United States House of Representatives; 1919–1931	Succeeded by South Trimble
