= Caleb J. McNulty =

American lawyer, newspaper editor and politician

Caleb Jefferson McNulty (December, 1816 – July 12, 1846) was an American lawyer, newspaper editor and politician. Active in the Democratic Party, he became Clerk of the U.S. House of Representatives; while serving in this post he was alleged to have embezzled congressional funds; some charges were subsequently dismissed, and he was acquitted of the others. John Quincy Adams, then serving as a Whig member of the House, referred to the charges as a "memorable development of Democratic defalcation."

== Early life ==
Born in West Middletown, Washington County, Pennsylvania, McNulty graduated from Jefferson College, and moved to Zanesville, Ohio, and then to Mount Vernon. He practiced law, worked as editor of the Democratic Banner newspaper, and became active in politics as a Democrat. McNulty served as Clerk of the Ohio House of Representatives, and was subsequently elected to the House himself.

On December 6, 1843, McNulty was elected by the members of the U.S. House to serve as their Clerk, defeating incumbent Matthew St. Clair Clarke of Pennsylvania.

In 1844, he ran for U.S. Congress, and lost to Whig candidate Columbus Delano by only 12 votes.

== Embezzlement charge ==
On January 17, 1845, a shortage of $45,000 was reported from a U.S. House contingency fund. McNulty was dismissed as Clerk, and the House recommended that the U.S. Secretary of the Treasury institute the necessary legal proceedings to recover the money from McNulty.

During the House investigation, Rep. John B. Weller produced a document ostensibly showing that McNulty had simply deposited $30,000 of House funds with a New York commercial house. McNulty’s accounting clerk produced documents, including a certificate ostensibly showing that the House had a credit for $29,000 at the bank. Edwin Stanton defended McNulty, and succeeded at obtaining dismissal of some charges, and acquittal on the others.

== Later life ==
McNulty's reputation in Ohio was largely undamaged. Though he had previously served in the militia and attained the rank of colonel, at the start of the Mexican–American War he joined the 1st Ohio Volunteer Infantry as a private. He died on a steamship (some sources indicate the Alhambra, others the Jamestown) near Helena, Arkansas while the regiment was en route to New Orleans for transport to Mexico.

== Family ==
McNulty was survived by his wife, Caroline Abbott Converse McNulty, and a one-year-old son named Rob Roy MacGregor McNulty (later, also, Converse), who had been born in Cincinnati in 1844. Caroline McNulty died before Rob Roy McNulty's tenth birthday, leaving him an orphan.

Rob Roy MacGregor McNulty Converse become a nationally prominent Episcopal priest and U.S. scholar, and a chaplain with the Union Army during the American Civil War. He was wounded at the Battle of Gettysburg and nursed back to health at the Mower U.S.A. General Hospital in Chestnut Hill, Philadelphia. Returned to the field for the Battle of the Wilderness, McNulty's brigade was captured by Confederates, and he was held as a prisoner of war at Andersonville from May to December, 1864.

After the war Rob Roy McNulty was successively rector of St. John's Church in Waterbury, Connecticut, Christ Church in Corning, New York, and St. Luke’s Church in Rochester, New York. A Phi Beta Kappa graduate of Iowa's Griswold College, he was also a professor of mathematics and science and chaplain at Washington and Jefferson College and Hobart College. He was also president of the Archaeological Institute of America and a fellow of the American Geographical Society.

== See also ==
- 28th United States Congress
- Jacksonian democracy

Government offices
Preceded by Matthew St. Clair Clarke	Clerk of the United States House of Representatives; December 6, 1843 - January 18, 1845	Succeeded by Benjamin B. French
