= William B. Franklin =

Union Army general (1823–1903)

William Buel Franklin
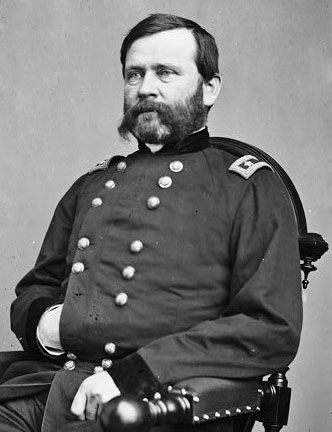
- Major General William B. Franklin
- Born: February 27, 1823; York, Pennsylvania, United States
- Died: March 8, 1903 (aged 80); Hartford, Connecticut, United States
- Burial place: Prospect Hill Cemetery, York, Pennsylvania
- Military career
- Allegiance: United States of America; Union
- Branch: United States Army; Union Army
- Service years: 1843–1865
- Rank: Major General
- Commands: VI Corps; XIX Corps
- Conflicts: Mexican-American War; Battle of Buena Vista; American Civil War; Manassas campaign; 1st Battle of Bull Run; Peninsula campaign; Battle of Yorktown; Battle of Eltham's Landing; Seven Days Battles; Battle of Garnett's & Golding's Farms; Battle of Savage's Station; Battle of White Oak Swamp; Battle of Malvern Hill; Maryland campaign; Battle of South Mountain; Battle of Crampton's Gap; Battle of Antietam; Battle of Fredericksburg; Second Battle of Sabine Pass; Red River campaign; Battle of Sabine Cross Roads; Battle of Pleasant Hill; Battle of Monett's Ferry

William Buel Franklin (February 27, 1823 – March 8, 1903) was a career United States Army officer and a Union Army general in the American Civil War. He rose to the rank of a corps commander in the Army of the Potomac, fighting in several notable battles in the eastern theater of the American Civil War. He also distinguished himself as a civil engineer before and after the war.

== Early life and military career ==
William B. Franklin was born in York, Pennsylvania, to Walter S. Franklin and Sarah Buel. His father was Clerk of the United States House of Representatives from 1833 until 1838. One of his great-grandfathers, Samuel Rhoads, was a member of the First Continental Congress from Pennsylvania.

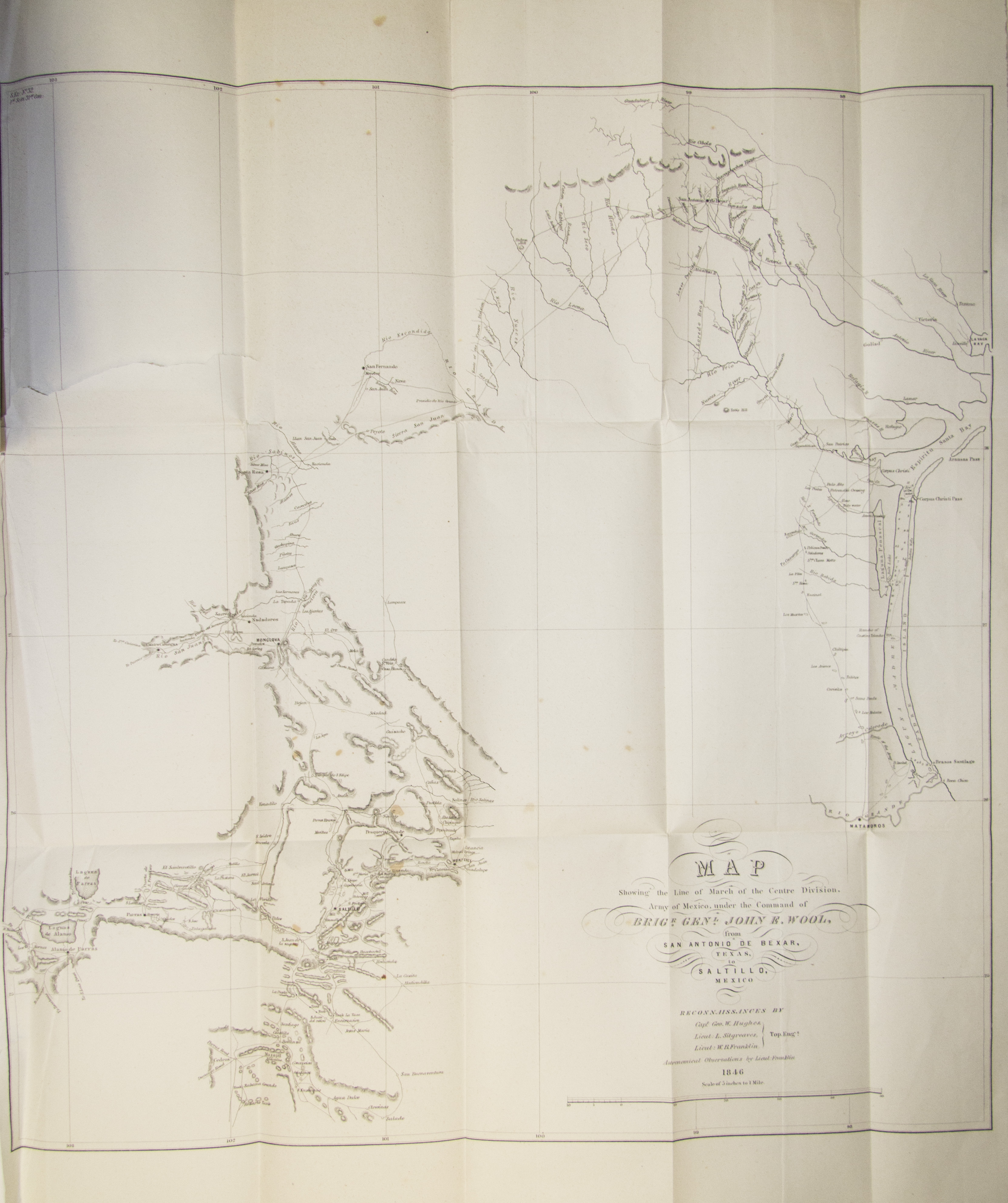
Hughes, Sitgreaves, and Franklin's Map Showing the Line of March of the Centre Division, Army of Mexico, under the Command of Brigr. Genl. John E. Wool, from San Antonio de Bexar, Texas, to Saltillo, Mexico, 1846-1850

Future President James Buchanan, then a senator, appointed Franklin to the United States Military Academy in June 1839. Franklin graduated first in the class of 1843 and joined the Corps of Topographical Engineers. His first assignment was to assist in the survey of the Great Lakes. Then, he was sent to the Rocky Mountains for two years to survey the region with the Stephen W. Kearny Expedition. He served under General John E. Wool during the Mexican–American War and received a brevet promotion to first lieutenant after the Battle of Buena Vista.

Upon his return from Mexico, Franklin was assigned various civil engineering duties in the War Department in Washington, D.C. In 1857, he received promotion to captain and was named the Army Engineer Secretary of the Light House Board with the task to oversee the construction of several lighthouses along the Atlantic Coast in New Hampshire and Maine. In November 1859, he replaced Montgomery C. Meigs as the engineer supervising construction of the United States Capitol Dome. In March 1861, just before the outbreak of the Civil War, he was appointed as the supervising architect for the new Treasury Building in Washington.

In 1852, Franklin married Anna L. Clarke, a daughter of Matthew St. Clair Clarke, who had preceded his father as Clerk of the House of Representatives. The Franklins had no children.

== Civil War ==
Soon after the beginning of the Civil War, Franklin was appointed colonel of the 12th U.S. Infantry Regiment, but three days later, on May 17, 1861, he was promoted to brigadier general of volunteers.

=== Eastern Theater ===
Franklin became colonel of the 12th US Infantry on June 18, 1861. He commanded a brigade at Bull Run and afterward became a division commander in the newly created Army of the Potomac. Franklin was promoted to brigadier general of volunteers on August 20 (backdated to May 17). In March 1862, the army was formed into corps, and Franklin was appointed to head the VI Corps, which he then led in the Peninsula Campaign. The VI Corps did not see extensive fighting in the Seven Days Battles, aside from its 2nd Division, which reinforced the V Corps at Gaines Mill. Franklin was one of two corps commanders (along with Erasmus Keyes of the IV Corps) who advocated retreat from Richmond rather than a counterattack. He was promoted to major general on July 4, 1862. His command was with the main army and did not participate in the Northern Virginia Campaign.

In the Maryland Campaign, he saw action against Gen. Howell Cobb at the Crampton's Gap during the Battle of South Mountain. He cleared off the Crampton's Gap but did not advance further in order to strike the rear of the Stonewall Jackson's troops that were laying siege to Harpers Ferry, which contributed to the factors causing the largest surrender of Federal forces during the Civil War that happened at the Battle of Harpers Ferry.

During the Battle of Antietam, his VI Corps was in reserve, and Franklin tried in vain to convince Maj. Gen. Edwin V. Sumner to allow his corps to exploit a weak point in the Confederate center, but Sumner, who outranked him, refused.

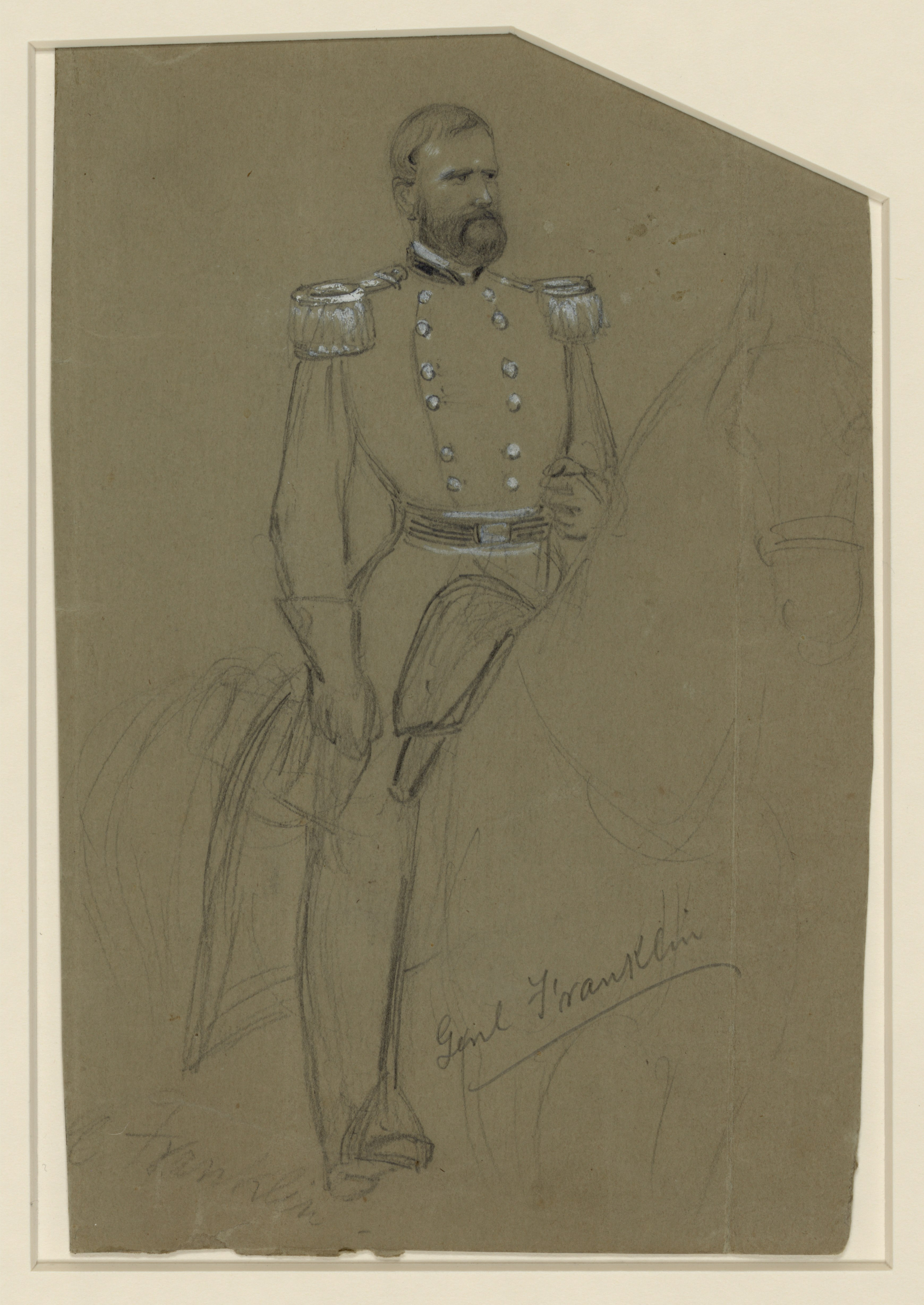
William B. Franklin in 1861, by Alfred Waud

Franklin was a staunch ally of Major General George B. McClellan, part of the reason he was not considered for command of the Army of the Potomac following the latter's dismissal in November 1862. During the Battle of Fredericksburg, he commanded one of the three so-called grand divisions—the Left Grand Division, which consisted of the I and VI Corps. Franklin advanced against the Confederate right flank, commanded by Lt. Gen. Thomas J. "Stonewall" Jackson, across the Rappahannock River to the south of Fredericksburg, Virginia. Franklin was late in deploying his troops. Then he was unaware that his subordinate Maj. Gen. George G. Meade, instead of sweeping around the Confederate army's right flank, as Burnside likely intended, turned in a half mile too soon and slammed directly into Stonewall Jackson's troops. Meade found a hole in their line and advanced a half mile beyond their front lines. However, Birney and Gibbon failed to support him and Doubleday only assisted with artillery. Only when Meade returned, having failed to maintain his break through the Confederate positions was Franklin even aware that he had needed assistance. Army of the Potomac commander Maj. Gen. Ambrose E. Burnside blamed Franklin personally for this failure, although he appears to have executed his orders exactly. Others who were there would disagree that Franklin executed his orders exactly. "Had the left grand division vigorously performed its part in the earlier movement, can any one doubt the result? I cannot think so. Had Meade, Reynolds, or Hancock been in command on the left that day, I feel confident that Fredericksburg would have been recorded a glorious victory instead of a horrible slaughter."

As political intrigue swept the Union Army after the Battle of Fredericksburg and the infamous Mud March, Franklin allegedly became a principal instigator of the cabal against Burnside's leadership. Burnside caused considerable political difficulty for Franklin in return, offering damaging testimony before the powerful U.S. Congress Joint Committee on the Conduct of the War and keeping him from field duty for months. When Joseph Hooker took command of the army that February, Franklin resigned his command, refusing to serve under him. During the 1863 Gettysburg campaign, Franklin was home in York, Pennsylvania, and assisted Maj. Granville Haller in developing plans for the defense of the region against an expected enemy attack.

=== Trans-Mississippi Theater ===
Eventually, Franklin was reassigned to the Department of the Gulf in New Orleans under Gen. Nathaniel P. Banks. In September 1863, he tried to capture Sabine Pass during the Second Battle of Sabine Pass. The operation ended abruptly after the combined Union Army and Navy invasion force of four gunboats and seven troop transports under Franklin's command lost two warships.

In March–May 1864, Franklin participated in the ill-fated Red River Campaign under Banks to occupy eastern Texas as commander of XIX Corps. On 8 April 1864, he was wounded in the leg at the Battle of Mansfield in Louisiana but stayed with the troops. After the Battle of Pleasant Hill he was replaced by Maj. Gen. William H. Emory as his condition grew steadily worse. In July 1864, being on medical leave, he was captured by Maj. Harry Gilmor's Confederate partisans in a train near Washington, D.C., but escaped the following day. The remainder of his army career was limited by disability from his wound and marred by his series of political and command misfortunes. He was unable to serve in any more senior commands, even with the assistance of his West Point classmate, friend, and future president, Ulysses S. Grant.

== Postbellum ==
Following the Civil War, General Franklin relocated to Hartford, Connecticut, and became the vice-president of the Colt Firearms Manufacturing Company serving in that capacity until 1888, as well as serving on the boards of several other manufacturing companies, including being a vice president of a Hartford area insurance company. Between 1872 and 1880, he supervised the construction of the Connecticut State Capitol, and served on other commissions, where his engineering experience proved helpful for the public. He contributed to expanding Hartford's public water service, among other engineering achievements. For two years, he also served as adjutant general of the Connecticut state militia.

In 1872, Franklin was approached by a Pennsylvania and New Jersey faction of the Democratic Party to run against Horace Greeley for the party's nomination as President of the United States, a task he declined, citing a need for party unity. He was a delegate to the 1876 Democratic National Convention. During the 1876 presidential election, he served as elector for Samuel J. Tilden. In June 1888, after his retirement from Colt Firearms, he was named as the U.S. Commissioner-General for the Paris Exposition of 1889, when he was made a grand officer of the Legion of Honour. Between 1880 and 1899, he was president of the Board of Managers of the National Home for Disabled Volunteer Soldiers.

William Franklin died in Hartford, Connecticut, on March 8, 1903, of complications of senility and was buried in Prospect Hill Cemetery in York, Pennsylvania. He was one of a relatively few general officers in the Civil War to live into the 20th century.

== Recognition ==
In 1861, Franklin was elected a Hereditary Member of the Pennsylvania Society of the Cincinnati. He became a member of the Military Order of the Loyal Legion of the United States. In 1887, he joined the Aztec Club of 1847 and was also a member of the Connecticut Society of Colonial Wars. The York County History Center in York, Pennsylvania, preserves many of his papers and personal effects from the Civil War.

== See also ==
- List of American Civil War generals (Union)

Military offices
Preceded by none	Commander of the VI Corps; May 18, 1862 – November 16, 1862	Succeeded by William Farrar Smith
Preceded by William P. Trowbridge	Connecticut Adjutant General; 1877–1878	Succeeded by Edward Harland
