= Matthew St. Clair Clarke =

American journalist, book author and politician

Matthew St. Clair Clarke (1790 Greencastle, Franklin County, Pennsylvania - May 6, 1852 Washington, D.C.) was an American journalist, writer and politician. He was Clerk of the United States House of Representatives for seven terms.

== Life ==
He was admitted to the bar in 1811, and practiced in Greencastle. Later he removed to Washington, D.C.

On December 3, 1822, he was elected on the 11th ballot Clerk of the House of Representatives in the 17th United States Congress, to fill the vacancy caused by the death of Clerk Thomas Dougherty. He was re-elected five times, serving throughout the 18th, 19th, 20th, 21st and 22nd United States Congresses, and opened the proceedings in the House of the 23rd United States Congress on December 2, 1833, when he was succeeded by Walter S. Franklin.

On May 31, 1841, Clarke was again elected Clerk of the House of Representatives in the 27th United States Congress. Clarke opened the proceedings of the 28th United States Congress on December 4, 1843, but was defeated for re-election by Caleb J. McNulty two days later.

Clarke was co-publisher with Peter Force of the latter's American Archives, a nine volume work of archives which was ultimately sold to the Library of Congress for $100,000 in 1867.

In 1843, he was appointed Sixth Auditor of the United States Treasury and remained in office until 1845.

In 1852, his daughter Anna L. Clarke married Gen. William B. Franklin, the son of Clerk of the House Walter S. Franklin who had succeeded Clarke in 1833.

== Works ==
- The Life and Adventures of Colonel David Crockett (novel, 1833)
- Cases of Contested Elections in Congress 1789 to 1834 compiled by Matthew St. Clair Clarke and David A. Hall (Washington, D.C., 1834, on line version)

== Sources ==
- Clerks of the House at House History
- Niles' Register (edition of December 7, 1822; pages 219 and 224)
- Obit transcribed from the Daily National Intelligencer originally published on May 7, 1852
- "Peter Force Library". Library of Congress. 2016.
- Harlow, Ralph V. (1964) [1931]. Malone, Dumas; Johnson, Allen (eds.). Dictionary of American Biography, Volume 3: Peter Force. New York, Scribner's.

Government offices
Preceded by Thomas Dougherty	Clerk of the United States House of Representatives; 1822 - 1833	Succeeded by Walter S. Franklin
Preceded by Hugh A. Garland	Clerk of the United States House of Representatives; 1841–1843	Succeeded by Caleb J. McNulty
