= William Pennington =

American politician (1796–1862)

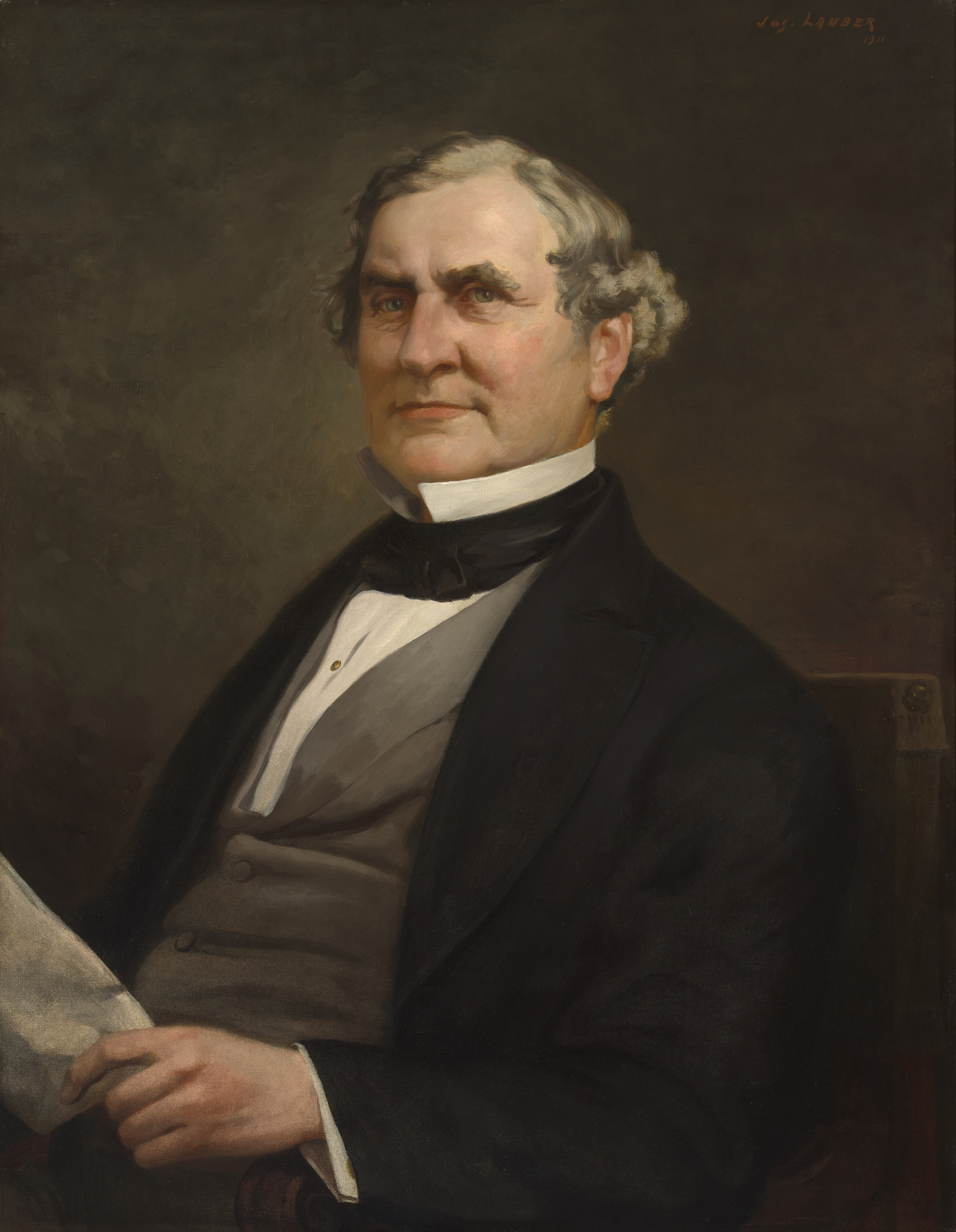

23rd Speaker of the United States House of Representatives
- In office February 1, 1860 – March 3, 1861
- Preceded by: James L. Orr
- Succeeded by: Galusha A. Grow

Leader of the House Republican Conference
- In office February 1, 1860 – March 3, 1861
- Preceded by: Office Established
- Succeeded by: Galusha A. Grow

Member of the U.S. House of Representatives from New Jersey's 5th district
- In office March 4, 1859 – March 3, 1861
- Preceded by: Jacob R. Wortendyke
- Succeeded by: Nehemiah Perry

13th Governor of New Jersey
- In office October 27, 1837 – October 27, 1843
- Preceded by: Philemon Dickerson
- Succeeded by: Daniel Haines

Member of the New Jersey General Assembly
- In office 1828

Personal details
- Born: May 4, 1796 Newark, New Jersey
- Died: February 16, 1862 (aged 65) Newark, New Jersey
- Party: Republican
- Other political affiliations: Whig
- Education: Princeton College
- Profession: Law

William Pennington (May 4, 1796 – February 16, 1862) was an American politician and lawyer. He was the 13th governor of New Jersey from 1837 to 1843. He served one term in the United States House of Representatives, during which he served as the first Republican Speaker of the House from 1860 to 1861.

== Early life and education ==
Born in Newark, New Jersey, he graduated from the College of New Jersey (now Princeton University) in 1813 and then studied law with Theodore Frelinghuysen. He was admitted to the bar in 1817 and served as a clerk of the United States District Court for the District of New Jersey (where his father was a judge) from 1817 to 1826. His father, William Sanford Pennington was a Revolutionary War veteran and was himself Governor of New Jersey from 1813 to 1815 before President James Madison appointed him as a federal judge.

== Governor of New Jersey ==
As a member of the Whig party, he was elected to the New Jersey General Assembly in 1828 and then was elected Governor of New Jersey annually from 1837 to 1843. His tenure as governor was marked by the "Broad Seal War" controversy. Following a disputed election for Congressional Representatives in New Jersey, Pennington certified the election of five Whig candidates, while five Democrats were certified by the Democratic Secretary of State. After a lengthy dispute, the Democrats were eventually seated.

== Speaker of the U.S. House of Representatives ==
In November 1858, Pennington was elected as a Republican to represent New Jersey's 5th congressional district in the U.S. House of Representatives during the 36th Congress, but only after a protracted election for speaker of the House of Representatives lasting 44 ballots over eight weeks (December 5, 1859, to February 1, 1860). It was the second time since 1789 that the House elected a freshman congressman as its speaker (after Henry Clay in 1811 (Note: The speaker during the 1st Congress, Frederick Muhlenberg, was technically also a new member.)); the feat has not been repeated since.

In March 1861, he penned his name on the Corwin Amendment, a proposed amendment to the U.S. Constitution shielding state "domestic institutions" (a euphemism for slavery) from future constitutional amendments and from abolition or interference by Congress. Submitted to the states for ratification shortly before the outbreak of the American Civil War, it was not ratified by the requisite number of states.

== Death ==
After running unsuccessfully for reelection in 1860 to the 37th Congress, he returned to New Jersey, dying in Newark of an unintentional morphine overdose. He was interred at Mount Pleasant Cemetery in Newark.

== See also ==
- List of governors of New Jersey

== Sources ==
- United States Congress. "William Pennington (id: P000214)". Biographical Directory of the United States Congress.
- New Jersey Historical Commission biography for William Pennington
- New Jersey Governor William Pennington, National Governors Association
- William Pennington biography from The Political Graveyard
- "William Pennington". Webster's American Biographies. G. & C. Merriam Company. 1975.

Political offices
Preceded by Philemon Dickerson	Governor of New Jersey; October 27, 1837 – October 27, 1843	Succeeded by Daniel Haines
Preceded by James L. Orr	Speaker of the U.S. House of Representatives; February 1, 1860 – March 4, 1861	Succeeded by Galusha A. Grow
U.S. House of Representatives
Preceded by Jacob R. Wortendyke	Member of the U.S. House of Representatives from New Jersey's 5th congressional district March 4, 1859 – March 4, 1861	Succeeded by Nehemiah Perry
