= Samuel Rhoads =

American politician

Founding Member, American Philosophical Society, Vice-President of the American Philosophical Society (1770-1779)

Personal details
- Born: 1711
- Died: April 7, 1784 (aged 72–73)

Samuel Rhoads (1711 – April 7, 1784) was an American architect who served as the 59th mayor of Philadelphia, Pennsylvania.

== Early life and family ==
Rhoads was born in Philadelphia into a Quaker family. His grandfather John Rhoads (also spelled Roads or Roades), had faced persecution after joining the Quaker faith. "The Rhoads family was one of note in England, and of great antiquity." In the late 17th century, he and two of his sons emigrated from Waingroves, Derbyshire to Pennsylvania. The second son, also named John Rhoads, married Hannah Willcox in 1692. Samuel was born in Philadelphia in 1711, their fifth child. He first worked as a carpenter and builder before becoming a merchant.

== Career ==
Rhoads's political career began in 1741, when he was elected to the Common Council of Philadelphia. He designed the east wing of the Pennsylvania Hospital. He also designed the west wing and an additional outdoor structure that weren't built until after his death, in 1794. Rhoads also served on the Board of Managers of the hospital. In 1761 he was elected to the Pennsylvania Assembly, where he served two terms. Rhoads shared the revolutionary sentiment spreading through the city in the 1770s and was a delegate to the First Continental Congress. He was elected Mayor of Philadelphia in 1774.

An associate and friend of Benjamin Franklin, Rhoads played a role in many of the important institutions of colonial Philadelphia. He was an early Director of the Library Company of Philadelphia, a founding Director of the Philadelphia Contributionship, and a Vice-President of the American Philosophical Society. He was a master of the Carpenters' Company of Philadelphia.

Rhoads died in 1784, age 73.

== Descendants ==
Rhoads was the grandfather of the seventh Clerk of the House of Representatives, Walter S. Franklin, the great-grandfather of (a) Samuel Rhoads Fisher who signed the Declaration of Independence of Texas from Centralist Republic of Mexico and was Secretary of the Navy of the Republic of Texas and (b) William B. Franklin, American Civil War general, and the third great grandfather of James McCrea president of the Pennsylvania Railroad from 1907 to 1913.

Political offices
Preceded by William Fisher	Mayor of Philadelphia; 1774–1775	Succeeded by Samuel Powel
