= Hugh A. Garland =

American lawyer

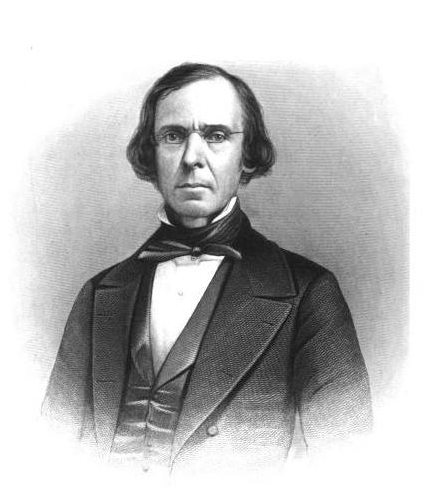
- Born: June 1, 1805; Nelson County, Virginia, U.S.
- Died: October 14, 1854 (aged 49)
- Education: Hampden Sydney College; University of Virginia
- Occupation: Lawyer
- Political party: Democrat
- Spouse: Anne Burwell
- Children: 9
- Relatives: Landon Garland, (brother), James Madison, (great-uncle), Samuel Garland Jr., (nephew)

Signature
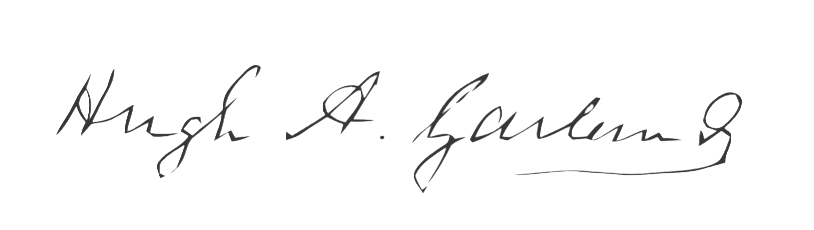

Hugh Alfred Garland (June 1, 1805 – October 14, 1854) was an American lawyer and politician. He served in the Virginia House of Delegates in 1833. In 1838 to 1841 he served as clerk of the United States House of Representatives.

Garland, a slave owner, was a staunch supporter of slavery in the United States, and he led the defense for Dred Scott's owner, John F. A. Sanford, in the case of Dred Scott v. Sandford, but died three years before the case was argued before the United States Supreme Court.

== Early life ==
Garland was born to Alexander Spotswood Garland and Lucinda Rose on June 1, 1805, in Nelson County, Virginia. Lucinda Rose was the daughter of Frances Taylor [Madison] Rose, whose brother was James Madison. He was the father of Confederate Colonel Hugh A. Garland Jr., brother of Landon Garland, the nephew of James Garland of the United States House of Representatives, the cousin of Confederate Army General Samuel Garland Jr., and the great-nephew of United States Founding Father and fourth President of the United States James Madison.

He was educated at Hampden Sydney College, where he taught briefly. During his time at Hampden-Sydney College he delivered an address to the literary societies about the importance of classical education. Garland then studied law at the University of Virginia.

== Career ==
Garland practiced the law in Boydton, Virginia, where his brother Landon Garland was a professor at Randolph Macon College. During that time, Garland's wife, Ann Burwell Garland, ran a female seminary. The house where they lived and operated the school is still extant.

In 1833, Garland was elected to the Virginia House of Delegates. Later in 1838 to 1841 he served as clerk of the United States House of Representatives, partly because of his staunch support of President Andrew Jackson's anti-bank policies while Garland was in the Virginia legislature. In 1839 he published a defense of the Democratic Party in the Democratic Review.

In September 1840, Garland addressed a meeting of Democrats in Groton, Connecticut, and attacked abolitionists. After this he was known as the champion of the "Northern Man with Southern feelings." In 1845 he delivered an oration commemorating Andrew Jackson in Petersburg, Virginia, where he was practicing law.

Changing fortunes following law practice in Petersburg, Virginia, led to a move in 1847 to St. Louis, where he was a lawyer for Dred Scott's owner. He and Lyman Decatur Norris were retained by the pro-slavery owner, Irene Emerson.

Ten slaves were owned by Hugh Garland in federal census in 1850 in Missouri. Anne Burwell Garland, his wife, owned her half-sister Elizabeth Keckley for some time. The widow Mrs. Garland allowed Elizabeth Keckley and her son to be emancipated in 1855 for $1,200 (~$41,464 in 2025). The half-sister of Mrs. Garland, who later became close to Mary Todd Lincoln, wrote a memoir about her time in slavery. Keckley wrote about the brutal treatment she received from the Burwell family and its friends in her autobiography.

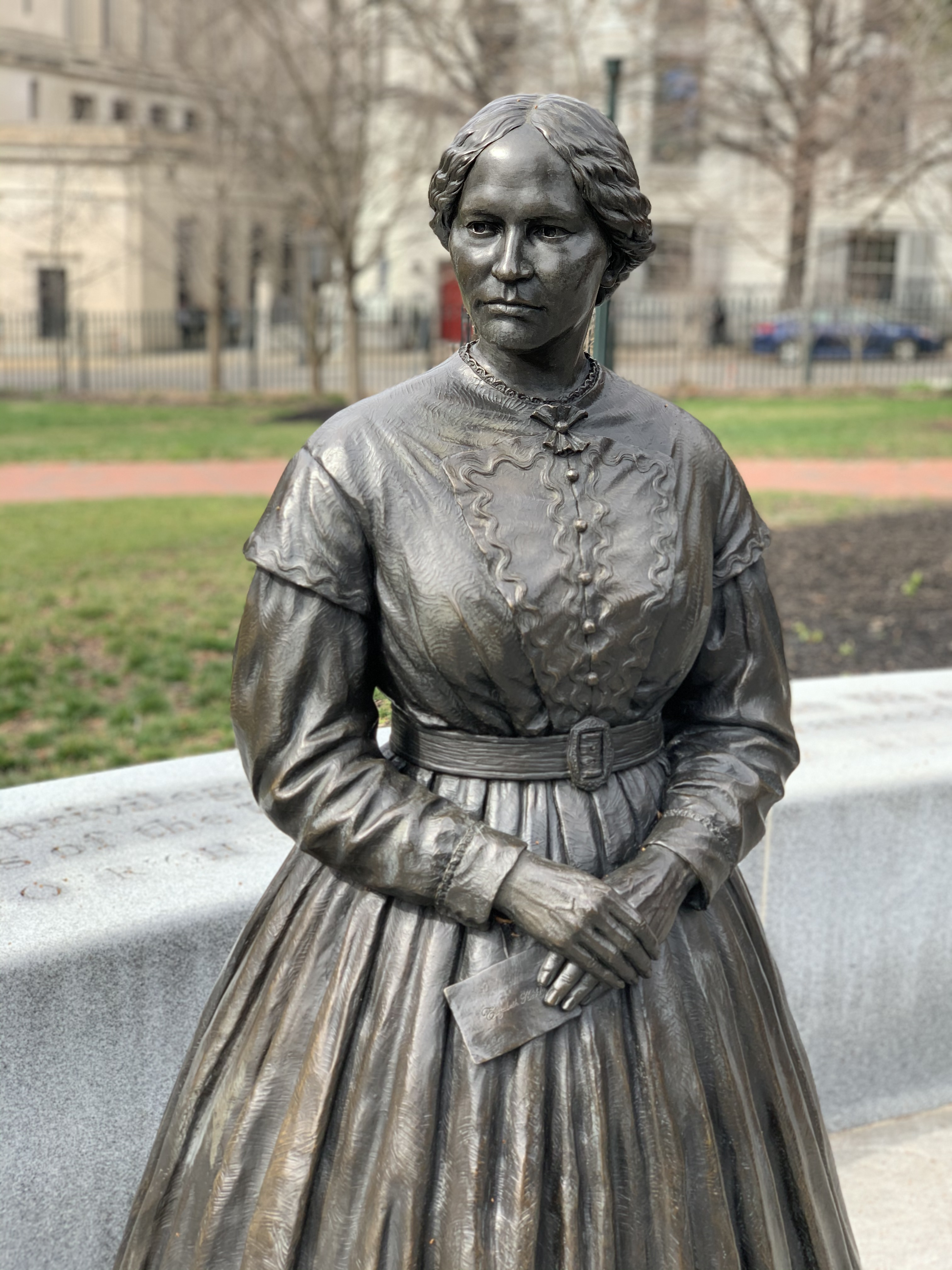
Statue of his wife's half-sister Elizabeth Keckley, who they enslaved, at the Virginia Women's Monument

Garland wrote a two-volume biography of John Randolph of Roanoke. The southern intellectual historian Michael O'Brien interprets Garland's biography of Randolph as influenced by the Romantic tradition and suggests that Garland made Randolph into a figure of the Romantic era. Garland also wrote Protestantism and Government (1852).

== Death and legacy ==
Garland died unexpectedly in St. Louis on October 14, 1854, at age 49.

Garland's son, Hugh Alfred Garland Jr., (1837–1864) was appointed a colonel of the consolidated 1st-4th Missouri Infantry Regiment in the Confederate States Army during the American Civil War. He died in 1864 in the Battle of Franklin.

== Writings ==
- A Discourse on the Importance of Classical Learning; pronounced before the Literary and Philosophical Society of Hampden Sydney College, at their fifth anniversary, in September, 1828. Thomas Willis White, Richmond (1828)
- Oration in commemoration of the life and services of Andrew Jackson, delivered in Petersburg, Virginia, on the 12th. of July, 1845, Bernard, Richmond (1845)
- "The second war of revolution; or The great principles involved in the present controversy between parties. By a Virginian" Office of the Democratic Review, Washington (1839)
- The Life of John Randolph of Roanoke D. Appleton & Company, New York (1851)
- A Course of Five Lectures, Delivered in St. Louis, on Protestantism and Government St. Louis (1852)

Government offices
Preceded by Walter S. Franklin	Clerk of the United States House of Representatives; 1838–1841	Succeeded by Matthew Clarke
