= Curator of the House of Representatives =

Employee of the US House of Representatives

The United States House of Representatives curator is an employee of the United States House of Representatives, under the supervision of the clerk of the House, who is responsible for the care of the House Collection of Fine Arts and Artifacts, on behalf of the House Fine Arts Board. The House's Office of Art and Artifacts collects, preserves, and interprets the House's fine and decorative arts, and historic objects. Through exhibits, publications, and other programs, the office supports the House in preserving and presenting the heritage of the House.

The current curator of the House is Farar Elliott. Elliott has served as the House curator since 2002.
