= Clerk of the United States House of Representatives =

Officer of the United States House of Representatives

- Logo of the clerk of the United States House of Representatives

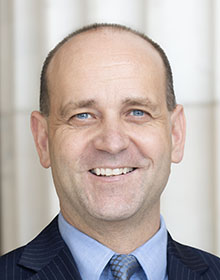
- Incumbent; Kevin McCumber since July 1, 2023
- United States House of Representatives
- Type: Clerk
- Nominator: Speaker of the House
- Appointer: Elected by the House
- Term length: Pleasure of the House (nominally a two-year Congress)
- First holder: John Beckley
- Deputy: Deputy Clerk of the United States House of Representatives; Reading Clerk of the United States House of Representatives
- Website: clerk.house.gov

The clerk of the United States House of Representatives is an officer of the United States House of Representatives, whose primary duty is to act as the chief record-keeper for the House.

Along with the other House officers, the clerk is elected every two years when the House organizes for a new Congress. The majority and minority caucuses nominate candidates for the House officer positions after the election of the speaker. The full House adopts a resolution to elect the officers, who will begin serving after they have taken the oath of office. The House Officers and Impeachment Clause of Article I, Section II states "The House of Representatives shall chuse their Speaker and other Officers". The Oath or Affirmation Clause of Article VI provides that "all ... Officers ... of the United States ... shall be bound by Oath or Affirmation, to support this Constitution", and pursuant to Article VI, the 1st United States Congress passed the Oath Administration Act (that remains in effect) which provides that "...the oath or affirmation [required by the sixth article of the Constitution of the United States]… shall be administered ... to the [C]lerk".

The incumbent clerk is Kevin McCumber. He was elected to replace Cheryl Johnson following her resignation on June 30, 2023, during the 118th Congress. Lisa Grant is a deputy clerk of the House.

The Constitution of the United States states in Article 1, Section 2, “The House of Representatives shall chuse their Speaker and other Officers...” On April 1, 1789, when the House of Representatives convened with its first quorum, its initial order of business was the election of the speaker, Frederick Augustus Conrad Muhlenberg, a representative from Pennsylvania. The next order of business was the election of the clerk, John Beckley of Virginia.

The first five clerks of the House also served as Librarian of Congress, which became a separate position in 1815. South Trimble, a former representative from Kentucky, who served as clerk from 1911 to 1919 and again from 1931 to 1946, is the longest-tenured clerk in House history.

== Duties ==
=== Organization of the House ===
When the newly elected members of the House gather on January 3, it is the clerk of the House who summons representatives and convenes the new Congress for the first time. Accordingly, the clerk calls the House to order by gaveling it into session. After a prayer and the Pledge of Allegiance, the clerk then calls the roll of representatives-elect, which is done as an electronic quorum call in the modern era, and then oversees the election of a speaker. During these processes, the clerk must "preserve order and decorum and decide all questions of order," which is subject to appeal.

The speaker is then sworn in, takes the chair, administers oaths to the rest of the members-elect, and the House then proceeds with other business.

==== Disputes in 19th century ====
In the 19th century, the power of the preceding House clerk to organize the House played a significant role at the beginning of several congresses. Following the 1838 elections, at the first meeting of the 26th Congress in December 1839, House clerk Hugh Garland omitted the names of five Whigs from New Jersey from the roll call. After days of debate, the Whigs were not seated, effectively creating a Democratic majority in a closely divided House. Only then was the roll call completed and a speaker elected.

In 1863, at the beginning of the 38th Congress during the Civil War, House clerk Emerson Etheridge called the roll, excluding 16 members from five pro-Union states (Maryland, Missouri, West Virginia, Kansas, and Oregon) while including three members from Louisiana. The effort failed, a motion was made to add the missing delegations, and a speaker was then elected. Edward McPherson was then elected to replace Etheridge as clerk for the 38th Congress.

Two years later, in December 1865 as the path of Reconstruction was being determined, McPherson omitted the names of members-elect from Tennessee, Virginia, and Louisiana from the roll for the 39th Congress, and allowed no interference or interruption during his call. After heated debate, in which a member-elect from Tennessee tried to gain floor recognition but was denied, a motion was made by Thaddeus Stevens to proceed to the election of Speaker, which was eventually agreed to. This enabled the Radical Republicans to firmly control Congress, ultimately imposing stricter conditions on readmission of Southern states and enabling Congress to override many vetoes from President Andrew Johnson.

=== Other duties ===
Federal law requires the clerk to notify each state government of the number of seats apportioned to the state no later than January 25 of the year immediately following each decennial census.

Rule II of the House Rules requires the clerk to:

- prepare the roll of members-elect.
- call the members-elect to order at the commencement of each Congress; to call the roll of Members-elect, and, pending the election of the speaker, to preserve order and decorum; and to decide all questions of order.
- prepare and distribute at the beginning of every session a list of reports required to be made to Congress.
- note all questions of order, and decisions thereon, and to print these as an appendix to the Journal of each session of the House.
- prepare and print the House Journal after each session of Congress, and to distribute the Journal to members and to the executive and the legislature of each State.
- attest and affix the seal of the House to all writs, warrants, and subpoenas and formal documents issued by the House.
- certify the passage by the House of all bills and joint resolutions.
- receive messages from the president and the Senate when the House is not in session.
- prepare and deliver messages to the Senate and otherwise as requested by the House.
- retain, in the official library, a permanent set of the books and documents generated by the House.
- manage the office and supervise the staff of any vacant member (the vacancy may have occurred by expulsion, resignation, or death) until a successor is elected.

In addition, the clerk:

- acts as custodian of all noncurrent records of the House, pursuant to Rule VII.
- is responsible, under the supervision and direction of the U.S. House of Representatives Fine Arts Board, for the administration, maintenance, and display of the works of fine art and other similar property of the Congress for display or for other use in the House wing of the Capitol, the House Office Buildings, or any other location under the control of the House (P.L. 100-696). In addition, pursuant to the rules of the United States Capitol Preservation Commission, the clerk may be asked to provide staff support and assistance to the commission.

== History ==
On April 1, 1789, the House of Representatives convened with its first quorum. Its initial order of business was the election of the speaker, Frederick Augustus Conrad Muhlenberg, a representative from Pennsylvania. The next order of business was the election of the clerk, John Beckley of Virginia. Although the clerk's title is derived from that of the clerk of the British House of Commons, the duties are similar to those prescribed for the Secretary of the Continental Congress in March 1785.

In addition to the duties involved in organizing the House and presiding over its activities at the commencement of each Congress, the clerk is charged with a number of legislative functions; some of these, such as the constitutional requirement of maintaining the House Journal, have existed from the time of the first Congress, whereas others have been added over the years because of changes in procedure and organization.

== List of clerks ==
The following persons served as Clerk of the United States House of Representatives:

No.	Image	Name	State	Years	Refs.
1a		John Beckley	Virginia	1789–1797	
2		Jonathan Condy	Pennsylvania	1797–1799	
3		John Holt Oswald	Pennsylvania	1799–1801	
1b		John Beckley	Virginia	1801–1807	
4		Patrick Magruder	Maryland	1807–1815	
5		Thomas Dougherty	Kentucky	1815–1822	
6a		Matthew Clarke	Pennsylvania	1822–1833	
7		Walter Franklin	Pennsylvania	1833–1838	
8		Hugh Garland	Virginia	1838–1841	
6b		Matthew Clarke	Pennsylvania	1841–1843	
9		Caleb J. McNulty	Ohio	1843–1845	
10		Benjamin Brown French	New Hampshire	1845–1847	
11		Thomas Campbell	Tennessee	1847–1850	
12		Richard M. Young	Illinois	1850–1851	
13a		John Weiss Forney	Pennsylvania	1851–1856	
14		William Cullom	Tennessee	1856–1857	
15		James C. Allen	Illinois	1857–1860	
13b		John Weiss Forney	Pennsylvania	1860–1861	
16		Emerson Etheridge	Tennessee	1861–1863	
17a		Edward McPherson	Pennsylvania	1863–1875	
18		George Adams	Kentucky	1875–1881	
17b		Edward McPherson	Pennsylvania	1881–1883	
19		John Clark	Missouri	1883–1889	
17c		Edward McPherson	Pennsylvania	1889–1891	
20		James Kerr	Pennsylvania	1891–1895	
21		Alexander McDowell	Pennsylvania	1895–1911	
22a		South Trimble	Kentucky	1911–1919	
23		William Tyler Page	Maryland	1919–1931	
22b		South Trimble	Kentucky	1931–1946	
24		Harry Newlin Megill	Maryland	1946–1947	
25		John Andrews	Massachusetts	1947–1949	
26a		Ralph Roberts	Indiana	1949–1953	
27		Lyle Snader	Illinois	1953–1955	
26b		Ralph Roberts	Indiana	1955–1967	
28		Pat Jennings	Virginia	1967–1975	
29		Edmund Henshaw	Virginia	1975–1983	
30		Benjamin Guthrie	Virginia	1983–1987	
31		Donnald Anderson	California	1987–1995	
32		Robin H. Carle	Idaho	1995–1998	
33		Jeff Trandahl	South Dakota	1999–2005	
34a		Karen L. Haas	Maryland	2005–2007	
35		Lorraine Miller	Texas	2007–2011	
34b		Karen L. Haas	Maryland	2011–2019	
36		Cheryl L. Johnson	Louisiana	2019–2023	
37		Kevin McCumber	Illinois	2023–present	

== Offices and services ==
In addition to the clerk's main office, located in H154 of the U.S. Capitol, there are nine offices that fall under the clerk's jurisdiction.

=== Capitol Service Groups ===
The Capitol Service Groups provide support services to the maintenance of the Republican and Democratic cloakrooms, the Lindy Claiborne Boggs Congressional Women's Reading Room, the Members and Family Committee Room, and the Capitol Prayer Room.

=== House Page Program ===
Pages were high school juniors who served as support staff for the U.S. House of Representatives, either for one of two school semester sessions or one of two summer sessions. The program was discontinued in 2011.

=== Legislative Computer Systems (LCS) ===
The Legislative Computer Systems office provides technical support for offices under the clerk and maintains the electronic voting system on the House floor.

=== Legislative Resource Center (LRC) ===
The Legislative Resource Center (LRC), a division of the Office of the Clerk, supports House legislative functions and keeps the public informed about the House and its legislative activities. LRC ensures that House-related information is accessible to all.

==== Legislative information ====
LRC supplies House members with the documents under consideration on the House floor. LRC also gathers and verifies information on actions by House committees and the President of the United States regarding legislation. The data are stored in the Legislative Information Management System (LIMS), an in-house system that tracks all legislation from its introduction on the floor to its signing by the President.

Through two functions, the United States House of Representatives Library and the House Document Room, LRC serves as the repository and a disseminator of official House legislative documents and publications. The library's collection comprises more than 200,000 volumes, as well as legislative and legal databases. The House Document Room stores hard copies of legislative documents and publications from the current and two preceding congresses, and makes them available to the public upon request, free of charge.

In addition, LRC responds to inquiries from congressional staff and the public regarding legislative information about Congress.

==== Public disclosure ====
LRC manages and serves as the customer service contact for lobbying disclosure filings, as well as public disclosure forms from all House officers, members, and staff. The center provides filers with forms and guidance on filing procedures, and responds to inquiries about disclosure from filers and others.

LRC gathers, organizes, and retains disclosure registrations and reports, and makes them accessible to the public, on-site and virtually.

==== House membership information ====
LRC compiles and publishes these official lists and informational publications about the House:

- Official lists of members
- The list of House standing committees and subcommittees
- The House telephone directory
- House office building directories
- Nominee and election statistics (presidential and congressional).

==== Support for congressional offices ====
LRC works with the Government Publishing Office to support congressional offices with orders for official stationery and envelopes and other print services.

=== Office of Art and Archives & Office of the Historian ===
The Office of Art and Archives & Office of the Historian collect, preserve, and interpret the artifacts and records of the House. The offices are responsible for the House's historical documentation, the House Collection of Fine Art and Artifacts, and the official records of the House from 1789 to the present. The House curator and chief of the office, Farar Elliott, curates the House Collection of several thousand objects and oversees the records of the House. Together with the historian of the House, the Office of Art and Archives oversees the institution's website.

=== Office of House Employment Counsel (OHEC) ===
This office provides advice about employment practices and acts as legal representation for all employing authorities in the House.

=== Office of Legislative Operations ===
This office coordinates the services of the bill and enrolling clerks, the journal clerks, the tally clerks, the daily digests, and the floor action reporting.

The Office of Legislative Operations provides support pertaining to the clerk's legislative duties. Among the duties of this office are receiving and processing official papers; compiling and publishing the daily minutes of House proceedings; operating the electronic voting system and overseeing the recording of votes; preparing messages to the Senate regarding passed legislation; and reading the bills, resolutions, amendments, motions, and Presidential messages that come before the House. The Office of Legislative Operations also prepares the summaries and schedules of House activities published in the Daily Digest section of the Congressional Record.

==== Bill clerks ====
A bill clerk receives and processes official papers including introduced bills and resolutions, amendments and additional co-sponsors.

==== Journal clerks ====
A journal clerk compiles the daily minutes of House proceedings and publishes these in the House Journal at the end of each session. The House Journal is the official record of the proceedings maintained in accordance with Article I, Section 5 of the U.S. Constitution.

==== Tally clerks ====
A tally clerk operates the electronic voting system, oversees the recording of votes on the House floor, receives reports of committees, and prepares the Calendar of the United States House of Representatives and History of Legislation.

==== Enrolling clerks ====
An enrolling clerk prepares all messages to the Senate regarding passed legislation, the official engrossed copy of all House-passed measures, and the official enrollment of all House-originated measures that have cleared both bodies of Congress.

==== Reading clerks ====
A reading clerk is responsible for the reading of all bills, resolutions, amendments, motions and presidential messages that come before the House; reports formally to the Senate all legislative actions taken by the House.

=== Office of Publication Services (OPS) ===
This office processes official print orders, such as those for letterhead and envelopes, for the House and produces official House publications, including the Official List of Members, the Capitol Directory Card, and the House Telephone Directory.

This office also develops and maintains the clerk's official website and the Kids in the House web site.

=== Official reporters ===
This office transcribes House proceedings verbatim for publication in the Congressional Record and provides stenographic support to committees for all hearings, meetings, and mark-up sessions.

== See also ==
- Secretary of the United States Senate
- Clerk of the House of Commons (United Kingdom)
- Clerk of the House of Commons (Canada)
- Clerk of the Australian House of Representatives
- Clerk of the New Zealand House of Representatives
- Secretary General of the Lok Sabha (India)
