= 104th United States Congress =

1995–1997 U.S. legislative term

←	103rd	105th	→
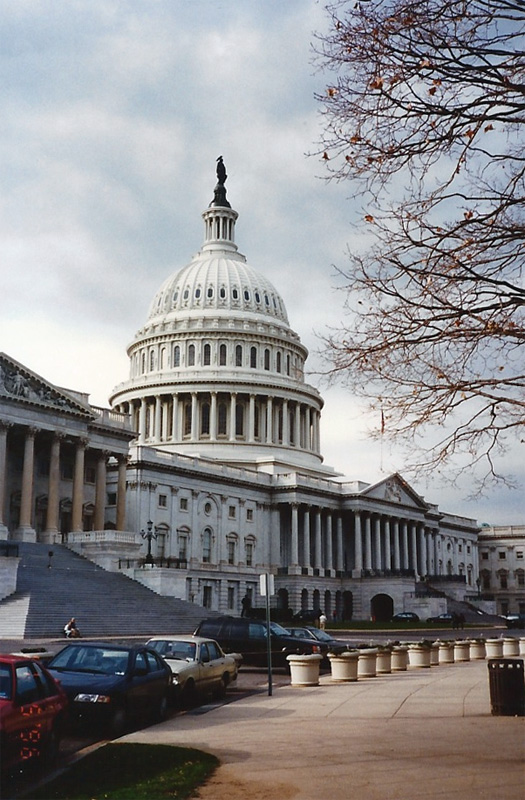
- United States Capitol (1996)

Overview
- Legislative body: United States Congress
- Jurisdiction: United States
- Term: January 3, 1995 – January 3, 1997

Senate
- Members: 100
- President: Al Gore (D)
- President pro tempore: Strom Thurmond (R)
- Party control: Republican

House of Representatives
- Members: 435 representatives 5 non-voting delegates
- Speaker: Newt Gingrich (R)
- Party control: Republican

Sessions
- 1st: January 4, 1995 – January 3, 1996
- 2nd: January 3, 1996 – October 4, 1996

The 104th United States Congress was a meeting of the legislative branch of the United States federal government, composed of the United States Senate and the United States House of Representatives. It met in Washington, D.C. from January 3, 1995, to January 3, 1997, during the third and fourth years of Bill Clinton's presidency. Apportionment of seats in the House of Representatives was based on the 1990 United States census.

Both chambers had Republican majorities for the first time since the 83rd Congress in 1953. Major events included passage of elements of the Contract with America and a budget impasse between Congress and the Clinton administration that resulted in the federal government shutdown of 1995 and 1996.

== Major events ==
- January 3, 1995: Republicans gained control of both houses for the first time since 1955.
- January 31, 1995: President Clinton invoked emergency powers to extend a $20 billion loan to help Mexico avert financial collapse.
- April 19, 1995: Oklahoma City bombing
- August 30, 1995: NATO began Operation Deliberate Force against Serbs in Bosnia and Herzegovina
- November 14–19, 1995: U.S. government shutdown
- December 16, 1995 – January 6, 1996: U.S. government shutdown
- November 5, 1996: Re-election of President Bill Clinton; Democrats gained 8 seats in House; Republicans gained 2 seats in Senate.
- First session of Congress where 3 sitting members of Congress had given birth, Enid Greene Waldholtz, Susan Molinari, and Blanche Lincoln.

== Major legislation ==
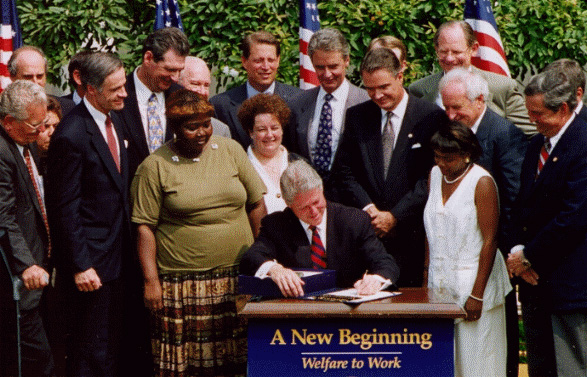
President Bill Clinton signing welfare reform legislation

- January 23, 1995: Congressional Accountability Act of 1995, Pub. L. 104–1 (text) (PDF)
- March 22, 1995: Unfunded Mandates Reform Act of 1995, Pub.L. 104-4
- April 10, 1995: Mexican Debt Disclosure Act of 1995, Pub. L. 104–6 (text) (PDF), 109 Stat. 73
- May 22, 1995: Paperwork Reduction Act of 1995, Pub.L. 104-13
- November 8, 1995: Jerusalem Embassy Act of 1995, Pub.L. 104-45
- November 28, 1995: National Highway System Designation Act of 1995, Pub. L. 104–59 (text) (PDF), 109 Stat. 568
- December 19, 1995: Lobbying Disclosure Act, Pub. L. 104–65 (text) (PDF), 109 Stat. 691, 2 U.S.C. ch. 26
- December 22, 1995: Private Securities Litigation Reform Act, Pub. L. 104–67 (text) (PDF), 109 Stat. 737
- December 28, 1995: Housing for Older Persons Act, Pub.L. 104-76
- December 29, 1995: ICC Termination Act of 1995, Pub.L. 104-88
- January 16, 1996: Federal Trademark Dilution Act, Pub.L. 104-98
- February 8, 1996: Telecommunications Act of 1996 (including the Communications Decency Act), Pub. L. 104–104 (text) (PDF), 110 Stat. 56, 47 U.S.C. § 609
- March 12, 1996: Cuban Liberty and Democratic Solidarity (Libertad) Act of 1996 (Helms-Burton Act), Pub. L. 104–114 (text) (PDF), 110 Stat. 785, 22 U.S.C. §§ 6021–6091
- March 29, 1996: Congressional Review Act
- April 4, 1996: Federal Agriculture Improvement and Reform (FAIR) Act of 1996, Pub.L. 104-127
- April 9, 1996: Line Item Veto Act, Pub. L. 104–130 (text) (PDF), 110 Stat. 1200
- April 24, 1996: Antiterrorism and Effective Death Penalty Act, Pub. L. 104–132 (text) (PDF), 110 Stat. 1214
- April 26, 1996: District of Columbia School Reform Act of 1995
- May 13, 1996: Mercury-Containing and Rechargeable Battery Management Act, Pub.L. 104-142
- May 17, 1996: Megan's Law,
- July 30, 1996: Taxpayer Bill of Rights 2, Pub. L. 104–168 (text) (PDF), 110 Stat. 1452
- August 3, 1996: National Gambling Impact Study Commission Act, Pub. L. 104–169 (text) (PDF), 110 Stat. 1482
- August 3, 1996: Food Quality Protection Act of 1996, Pub. L. 104–170 (text) (PDF), 110 Stat. 1489, 7 U.S.C. § 136
- August 5, 1996: Iran and Libya Sanctions Act of 1996, Pub.L. 104-172
- August 20, 1996: Small Business Job Protection Act of 1996, Pub. L. 104–188 (text) (PDF), 110 Stat. 1755
- August 21, 1996: Health Insurance Portability and Accountability Act (HIPAA), Pub. L. 104–191 (text) (PDF), 110 Stat. 1936
- August 21, 1996: War Crimes Act of 1996, Pub.L. 104-192
- August 22, 1996: Personal Responsibility and Work Opportunity Act (Welfare Reform Act), Pub. L. 104–193 (text) (PDF), 110 Stat. 2105
- September 21, 1996: Defense of Marriage Act, Pub. L. 104–199 (text) (PDF), 110 Stat. 2419
- September 26, 1996; Mental Health Parity Act, Pub.L. 104-204
- September 30, 1996: Omnibus Consolidated Appropriations Act, 1997 (Includes Domestic Violence Offender Gun Ban, Child Pornography Prevention Act of 1996; Clinger-Cohen Act of 1996) Pub. L. 104–208 (text) (PDF), 110 Stat. 3001
- September 30, 1996: Illegal Immigration Reform and Immigrant Responsibility Act of 1996, Pub. L. 104–208 (text) (PDF), 110 Stat. 3009
- September 30, 1996: Library Services and Technology Act
- October 1, 1996: Emerson Good Samaritan Food Donation Act, Pub. L. 104–210 (text) (PDF), 110 Stat. 3011
- October 3, 1996: Comprehensive Methamphetamine Control Act of 1996, Pub.L. 104-237
- October 9, 1996: Helium Privatization Act of 1996, Pub.L. 104-273
- October 9, 1996: Animal Drug Availability Act 1996,
- October 11, 1996: National Securities Markets Improvement Act of 1996, Pub.L. 104-290
- October 11, 1996: Economic Espionage Act of 1996, Pub.L. 104-294
- October 11, 1996: Health Center Consolidation Act, Pub. L. 104–299 (text) (PDF), 110 Stat. 3626
- October 12, 1996: Water Resources Development Act of 1996, Pub. L. 104–303 (text) (PDF), 110 Stat. 3658
- October 20, 1996: United States Commemorative Coin Act of 1996, Pub.L. 104-329
- October 26, 1996: Native American Housing Assistance and Self-Determination Act of 1996, Pub.L. 104-330
- October 26, 1996: National Invasive Species Act, Pub.L. 104-332

== Party summary ==
=== Senate ===
Party standings on the opening day of the 104th Congress 47 Democratic senators 53 Republican senators

	Party (shading shows control)		Total	Vacant
	Democratic	Republican	Total	Vacant
End of previous congress	53	47	100	0
Begin	47	53	100	0
End	47	53	100	0
Final voting share	47.0%	53.0%		
Beginning of next congress	45	55	100	0

=== House of Representatives ===
	Party (shading shows control)			Total	Vacant
	Democratic	Independent	Republican	Total	Vacant
End of previous congress	256	1	177	434	1
Begin	204	1	230	435	0
End	197	1	235	433	2
Final voting share	45.5%	0.2%	54.3%		
Non-voting members	4	1	0	5	
Beginning of next congress	207	1	227	435	0

Senators' party membership by state at the opening of the 104th Congress in January 1995 2 Democrats 1 Democrat and 1 Republican 2 Republicans

== Leadership ==
=== Senate ===
Senate President

Al Gore (D)

Senate President pro Tempore

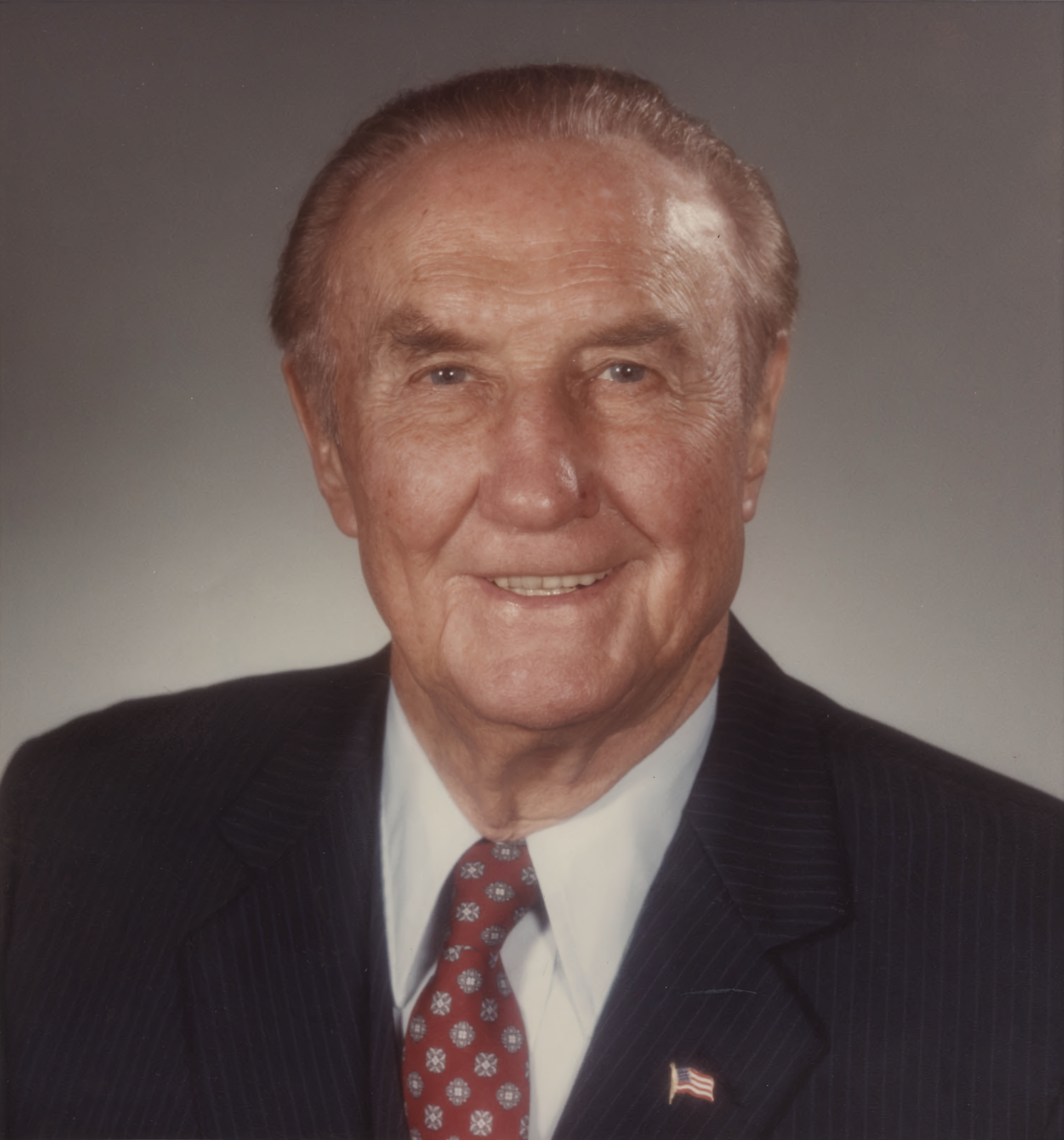
Strom Thurmond (R)

- President: Al Gore (D)
- President pro tempore: Strom Thurmond (R)

==== Majority (Republican) leadership ====
- Majority Leader:
  - Bob Dole, until June 11, 1996
  - Trent Lott, starting June 12, 1996
- Majority Whip:
  - Trent Lott, until June 11, 1996
  - Don Nickles, starting June 12, 1996
- Republican Conference Chairman: Thad Cochran
- Republican Conference Secretary: Connie Mack III
- Republican Campaign Committee Chair: Al D'Amato
- Republican Policy Committee Chairman:
  - Don Nickles, until June 12, 1996
  - Larry Craig, starting June 12, 1996

==== Minority (Democratic) leadership ====
- Minority Leader: Tom Daschle
- Minority Whip: Wendell Ford
- Policy Committee Co-Chairs: Tom Daschle and Harry Reid
- Democratic Conference Secretary: Barbara Mikulski
- Democratic Campaign Committee Chairman: Bob Kerrey
- Chief Deputy Whip: John Breaux

=== House of Representatives ===
Speaker of the House

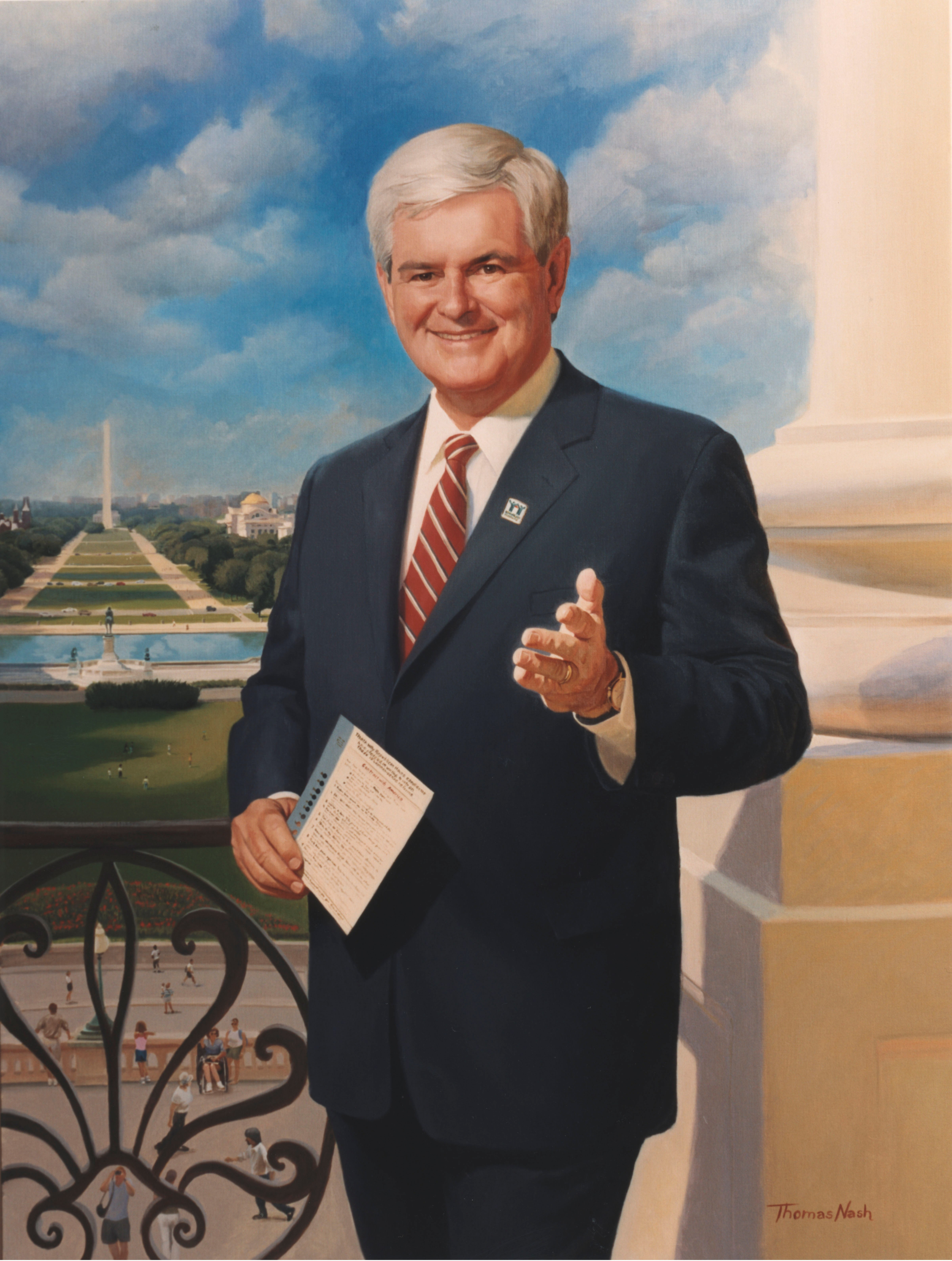
Newt Gingrich (R)

- Speaker: Newt Gingrich (R)

==== Majority (Republican) leadership ====
- Majority Leader: Dick Armey
- Majority Vice of House: Tom DeLay
- Chief Deputy Whip: Dennis Hastert
- Republican Conference Chairman: John Boehner
- Republican Conference Vice-Chairwoman: Susan Molinari
- Republican Conference Secretary: Barbara Vucanovich
- Policy Committee Chairman: Christopher Cox
- Republican Campaign Committee Chairman: Bill Paxon

==== Minority (Democratic) leadership ====
- Minority Leader: Dick Gephardt
- Minority Whip: David Bonior
- Chief Deputy Minority Whips: Rosa DeLauro, John Lewis, & Bill Richardson
- Democratic Caucus Chairman: Vic Fazio
- Democratic Caucus Vice-Chairman: Barbara B. Kennelly
- Democratic Campaign Committee Chairman: Martin Frost

== Caucuses ==
- Armenian Caucus
- Biomedical Research Caucus
- Blue Dog Coalition
- Congressional Arts Caucus
- Congressional Asian Pacific American Caucus
- Congressional Automotive Caucus
- Congressional Bike Caucus
- Congressional Black Caucus
- Congressional Caucus on India and Indian Americans
- Congressional Caucus on Korea
- Congressional Fire Services Caucus
- Congressional Friends of Ireland Caucus
- Congressional Hispanic Caucus
- Congressional Motorsports Caucus
- Congressional Pediatric & Adult Hydrocephalus Caucus
- Congressional Progressive Caucus
- Congressional Portuguese-American Caucus
- Congressional Travel & Tourism Caucus
- Congressional Western Caucus
- Congresswomen's Caucus
- Hong Kong Caucus
- House Democratic Caucus
- Law Enforcement Caucus
- Northern Border Caucus
- Renewable Energy and Energy Efficiency Caucus
- Senate Democratic Caucus

== Members ==
Skip to House of Representatives, below

=== Senate ===
In this Congress, Class 2 meant their term ended with this Congress, requiring re-election in 1996; Class 3 meant their term began in the last Congress, requiring re-election in 1998; and Class 1 meant their term began in this Congress, requiring re-election in 2000.

==== Alabama ====
▌2. Howell Heflin (D)
▌3. Richard Shelby (R)

==== Alaska ====
▌2. Ted Stevens (R)
▌3. Frank Murkowski (R)

==== Arizona ====
▌1. Jon Kyl (R)
▌3. John McCain (R)

==== Arkansas ====
▌2. David Pryor (D)
▌3. Dale Bumpers (D)

==== California ====
▌1. Dianne Feinstein (D)
▌3. Barbara Boxer (D)

==== Colorado ====
▌2. Hank Brown (R)
▌▌3. Ben Nighthorse Campbell (D, then R)

==== Connecticut ====
▌1. Joe Lieberman (D)
▌3. Chris Dodd (D)

==== Delaware ====
▌1. William Roth (R)
▌2. Joe Biden (D)

==== Florida ====
▌1. Connie Mack III (R)
▌3. Bob Graham (D)

==== Georgia ====
▌2. Sam Nunn (D)
▌3. Paul Coverdell (R)

==== Hawaii ====
▌1. Daniel Akaka (D)
▌3. Daniel Inouye (D)

==== Idaho ====
▌2. Larry Craig (R)
▌3. Dirk Kempthorne (R)

==== Illinois ====
▌2. Paul Simon (D)
▌3. Carol Moseley-Braun (D)

==== Indiana ====
▌1. Dick Lugar (R)
▌3. Dan Coats (R)

==== Iowa ====
▌2. Tom Harkin (D)
▌3. Chuck Grassley (R)

==== Kansas ====
▌2. Nancy Kassebaum (R)
▌3. Bob Dole (R), until June 11, 1996

▌Sheila Frahm (R), June 11, 1996 – November 6, 1996
▌Sam Brownback (R), from November 6, 1996

==== Kentucky ====
▌2. Mitch McConnell (R)
▌3. Wendell Ford (D)

==== Louisiana ====
▌2. J. Bennett Johnston (D)
▌3. John Breaux (D)

==== Maine ====
▌1. Olympia Snowe (R)
▌2. William Cohen (R)

==== Maryland ====
▌1. Paul Sarbanes (D)
▌3. Barbara Mikulski (D)

==== Massachusetts ====
▌1. Ted Kennedy (D)
▌2. John Kerry (D)

==== Michigan ====
▌1. Spencer Abraham (R)
▌2. Carl Levin (D)

==== Minnesota ====
▌1. Rod Grams (R)
▌2. Paul Wellstone (DFL)

==== Mississippi ====
▌1. Trent Lott (R)
▌2. Thad Cochran (R)

==== Missouri ====
▌1. John Ashcroft (R)
▌3. Kit Bond (R)

==== Montana ====
▌1. Conrad Burns (R)
▌2. Max Baucus (D)

==== Nebraska ====
▌1. Bob Kerrey (D)
▌2. J. James Exon (D)

==== Nevada ====
▌1. Richard Bryan (D)
▌3. Harry Reid (D)

==== New Hampshire ====
▌2. Bob Smith (R)
▌3. Judd Gregg (R)

==== New Jersey ====
▌1. Frank Lautenberg (D)
▌2. Bill Bradley (D)

==== New Mexico ====
▌1. Jeff Bingaman (D)
▌2. Pete Domenici (R)

==== New York ====
▌1. Daniel Patrick Moynihan (D)
▌3. Al D'Amato (R)

==== North Carolina ====
▌2. Jesse Helms (R)
▌3. Lauch Faircloth (R)

==== North Dakota ====
▌1. Kent Conrad (D-NPL)
▌3. Byron Dorgan (D-NPL)

==== Ohio ====
▌1. Mike DeWine (R)
▌3. John Glenn (D)

==== Oklahoma ====
▌2. Jim Inhofe (R)
▌3. Don Nickles (R)

==== Oregon ====
▌2. Mark Hatfield (R)
▌3. Bob Packwood (R), until October 1, 1995

▌Ron Wyden (D), from February 6, 1996

==== Pennsylvania ====
▌1. Rick Santorum (R)
▌3. Arlen Specter (R)

==== Rhode Island ====
▌1. John Chafee (R)
▌2. Claiborne Pell (D)

==== South Carolina ====
▌2. Strom Thurmond (R)
▌3. Fritz Hollings (D)

==== South Dakota ====
▌2. Larry Pressler (R)
▌3. Tom Daschle (D)

==== Tennessee ====
▌1. Bill Frist (R)
▌2. Fred Thompson (R)

==== Texas ====
▌1. Kay Bailey Hutchison (R)
▌2. Phil Gramm (R)

==== Utah ====
▌1. Orrin Hatch (R)
▌3. Bob Bennett (R)

==== Vermont ====
▌1. Jim Jeffords (R)
▌3. Patrick Leahy (D)

==== Virginia ====
▌1. Chuck Robb (D)
▌2. John Warner (R)

==== Washington ====
▌1. Slade Gorton (R)
▌3. Patty Murray (D)

==== West Virginia ====
▌1. Robert Byrd (D)
▌2. Jay Rockefeller (D)

==== Wisconsin ====
▌1. Herb Kohl (D)
▌3. Russ Feingold (D)

==== Wyoming ====
▌1. Craig L. Thomas (R)
▌2. Alan Simpson (R)

Senate majority leadership

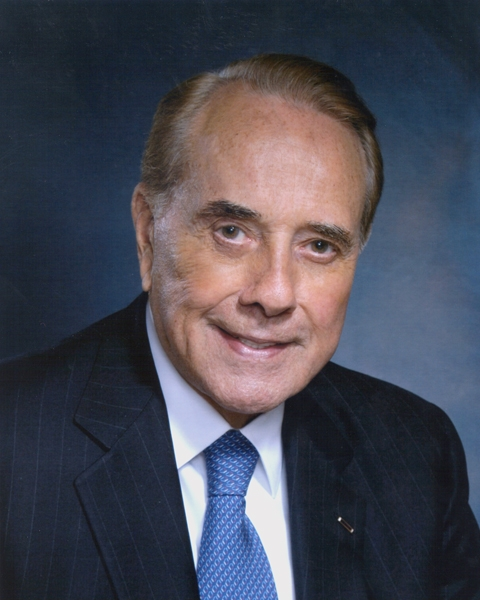
Republican leader
Bob Dole
(until June 11, 1996)

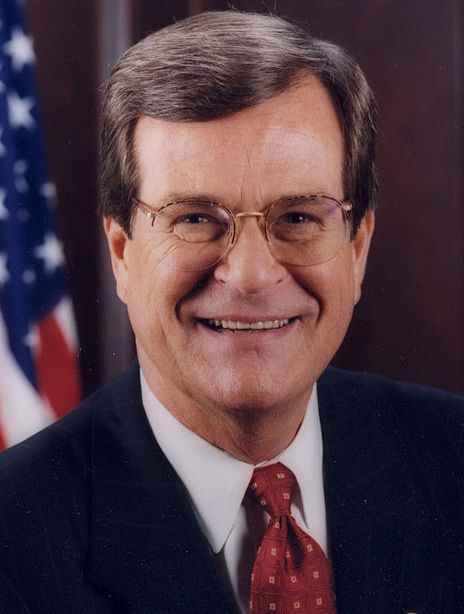
Republican whip and leader
Trent Lott
(until June 12, 1996)
(from June 12, 1996)

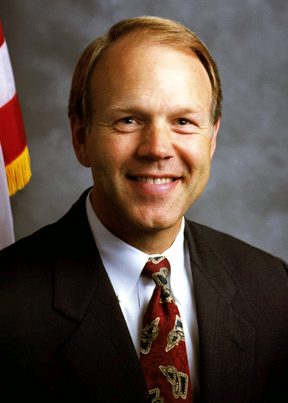
Republican whip
Don Nickles
(from June 12, 1996)

Senate minority leadership

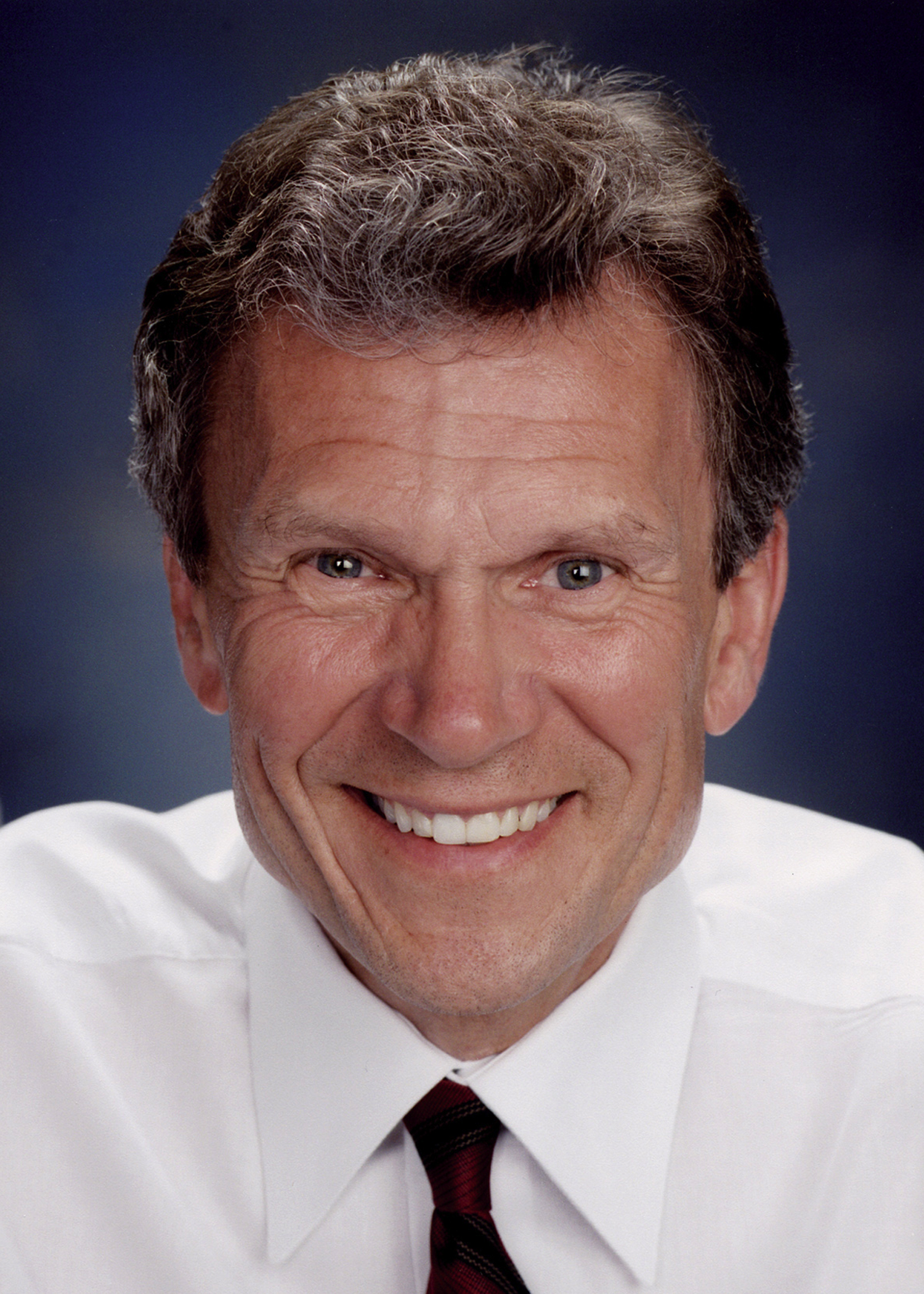
Democratic leader
Tom Daschle

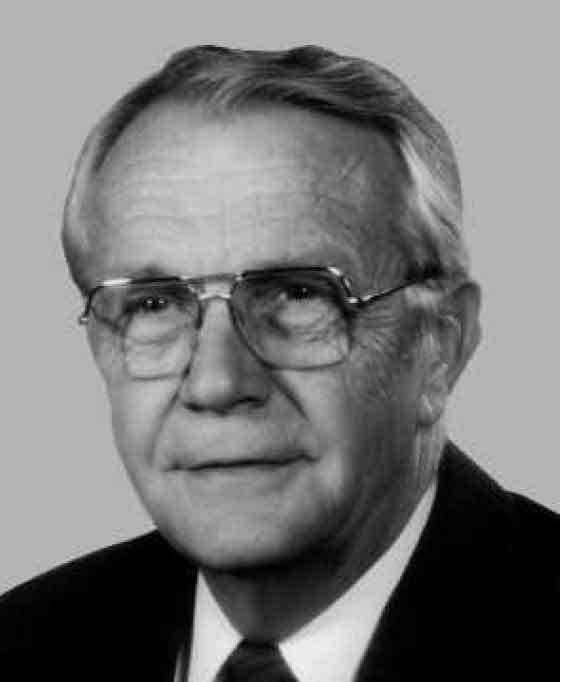
Democratic whip
Wendell Ford

=== House of Representatives ===
The names of representatives are preceded by their district numbers.

==== Alabama ====
▌1. Sonny Callahan (R)
▌2. Terry Everett (R)
▌3. Glen Browder (D)
▌4. Tom Bevill (D)
▌5. Robert E. Cramer (D)
▌6. Spencer Bachus (R)
▌7. Earl Hilliard (D)

==== Alaska ====
▌At-large. Don Young (R)

==== Arizona ====
▌1. Matt Salmon (R)
▌2. Ed Pastor (D)
▌3. Bob Stump (R)
▌4. John Shadegg (R)
▌5. Jim Kolbe (R)
▌6. J. D. Hayworth (R)

==== Arkansas ====
▌1. Blanche Lincoln (D)
▌2. Ray Thornton (D), until January 1, 1997
▌3. Tim Hutchinson (R), until January 2, 1997
▌4. Jay Dickey (R)

==== California ====
▌1. Frank Riggs (R)
▌2. Wally Herger (R)
▌3. Vic Fazio (D)
▌4. John Doolittle (R)
▌5. Bob Matsui (D)
▌6. Lynn Woolsey (D)
▌7. George Miller (D)
▌8. Nancy Pelosi (D)
▌9. Ron Dellums (D)
▌10. William P. Baker (R)
▌11. Richard Pombo (R)
▌12. Tom Lantos (D)
▌13. Pete Stark (D)
▌14. Anna Eshoo (D)
▌15. Norman Mineta (D), until October 10, 1995

▌Tom Campbell (R), from December 12, 1995

▌16. Zoe Lofgren (D)
▌17. Sam Farr (D)
▌18. Gary Condit (D)
▌19. George Radanovich (R)
▌20. Cal Dooley (D)
▌21. Bill Thomas (R)
▌22. Andrea Seastrand (R)
▌23. Elton Gallegly (R)
▌24. Anthony Beilenson (D)
▌25. Buck McKeon (R)
▌26. Howard Berman (D)
▌27. Carlos Moorhead (R)
▌28. David Dreier (R)
▌29. Henry Waxman (D)
▌30. Xavier Becerra (D)
▌31. Matthew G. Martínez (D)
▌32. Julian Dixon (D)
▌33. Lucille Roybal-Allard (D)
▌34. Esteban Edward Torres (D)
▌35. Maxine Waters (D)
▌36. Jane Harman (D)
▌37. Walter R. Tucker III (D), until December 15, 1995

▌Juanita Millender-McDonald (D), from March 26, 1996

▌38. Steve Horn (R)
▌39. Ed Royce (R)
▌40. Jerry Lewis (R)
▌41. Jay Kim (R)
▌42. George Brown Jr. (D)
▌43. Ken Calvert (R)
▌44. Sonny Bono (R)
▌45. Dana Rohrabacher (R)
▌46. Bob Dornan (R)
▌47. Christopher Cox (R)
▌48. Ron Packard (R)
▌49. Brian Bilbray (R)
▌50. Bob Filner (D)
▌51. Duke Cunningham (R)
▌52. Duncan L. Hunter (R)

==== Colorado ====
▌1. Pat Schroeder (D)
▌2. David Skaggs (D)
▌3. Scott McInnis (R)
▌4. Wayne Allard (R)
▌5. Joel Hefley (R)
▌6. Dan Schaefer (R)

==== Connecticut ====
▌1. Barbara B. Kennelly (D)
▌2. Sam Gejdenson (D)
▌3. Rosa DeLauro (D)
▌4. Chris Shays (R)
▌5. Gary A. Franks (R)
▌6. Nancy Johnson (R)

==== Delaware ====
▌At-large. Mike Castle (R)

==== Florida ====
▌1. Joe Scarborough (R)
▌2. Pete Peterson (D)
▌3. Corrine Brown (D)
▌4. Tillie Fowler (R)
▌5. Karen Thurman (D)
▌6. Cliff Stearns (R)
▌7. John Mica (R)
▌8. Bill McCollum (R)
▌9. Michael Bilirakis (R)
▌10. Bill Young (R)
▌11. Sam Gibbons (D)
▌12. Charles T. Canady (R)
▌13. Dan Miller (R)
▌14. Porter Goss (R)
▌15. Dave Weldon (R)
▌16. Mark Foley (R)
▌17. Carrie Meek (D)
▌18. Ileana Ros-Lehtinen (R)
▌19. Harry Johnston (D)
▌20. Peter Deutsch (D)
▌21. Lincoln Diaz-Balart (R)
▌22. Clay Shaw (R)
▌23. Alcee Hastings (D)

==== Georgia ====
▌1. Jack Kingston (R)
▌2. Sanford Bishop (D)
▌3. Mac Collins (R)
▌4. John Linder (R)
▌5. John Lewis (D)
▌6. Newt Gingrich (R)
▌7. Bob Barr (R)
▌8. Saxby Chambliss (R)
▌▌9. Nathan Deal (D) until April 1995; (R) thereafter
▌10. Charlie Norwood (R)
▌11. Cynthia McKinney (D)

==== Hawaii ====
▌1. Neil Abercrombie (D)
▌2. Patsy Mink (D)

==== Idaho ====
▌1. Helen Chenoweth (R)
▌2. Mike Crapo (R)

==== Illinois ====
▌1. Bobby Rush (D)
▌2. Mel Reynolds (D), until October 1, 1995

▌Jesse Jackson Jr. (D), from December 12, 1995

▌3. Bill Lipinski (D)
▌4. Luis Gutiérrez (D)
▌5. Michael Patrick Flanagan (R)
▌6. Henry Hyde (R)
▌7. Cardiss Collins (D)
▌8. Phil Crane (R)
▌9. Sidney R. Yates (D)
▌10. John Porter (R)
▌11. Jerry Weller (R)
▌12. Jerry Costello (D)
▌13. Harris W. Fawell (R)
▌14. Dennis Hastert (R)
▌15. Thomas W. Ewing (R)
▌16. Don Manzullo (R)
▌17. Lane Evans (D)
▌18. Ray LaHood (R)
▌19. Glenn Poshard (D)
▌20. Dick Durbin (D)

==== Indiana ====
▌1. Pete Visclosky (D)
▌2. David M. McIntosh (R)
▌3. Tim Roemer (D)
▌4. Mark Souder (R)
▌5. Steve Buyer (R)
▌6. Dan Burton (R)
▌7. John T. Myers (R)
▌8. John Hostettler (R)
▌9. Lee H. Hamilton (D)
▌10. Andrew Jacobs Jr. (D)

==== Iowa ====
▌1. Jim Leach (R)
▌2. Jim Nussle (R)
▌3. Jim Ross Lightfoot (R)
▌4. Greg Ganske (R)
▌5. Tom Latham (R)

==== Kansas ====
▌1. Pat Roberts (R)
▌2. Sam Brownback (R), until November 7, 1996

▌Jim Ryun (R), from November 27, 1996

▌3. Jan Meyers (R)
▌4. Todd Tiahrt (R)

==== Kentucky ====
▌1. Ed Whitfield (R)
▌2. Ron Lewis (R)
▌3. Mike Ward (D)
▌4. Jim Bunning (R)
▌5. Hal Rogers (R)
▌6. Scotty Baesler (D)

==== Louisiana ====
▌1. Bob Livingston (R)
▌2. William J. Jefferson (D)
▌▌3. Billy Tauzin (D, then R)
▌4. Cleo Fields (D)
▌5. Jim McCrery (R)
▌6. Richard Baker (R)
▌▌7. Jimmy Hayes (D, then R)

==== Maine ====
▌1. James B. Longley Jr. (R)
▌2. John Baldacci (D)

==== Maryland ====
▌1. Wayne Gilchrest (R)
▌2. Bob Ehrlich (R)
▌3. Ben Cardin (D)
▌4. Albert Wynn (D)
▌5. Steny Hoyer (D)
▌6. Roscoe Bartlett (R)
▌7. Kweisi Mfume (D), until February 15, 1996

▌Elijah Cummings (D), from April 16, 1996

▌8. Connie Morella (R)

==== Massachusetts ====
▌1. John Olver (D)
▌2. Richard Neal (D)
▌3. Peter I. Blute (R)
▌4. Barney Frank (D)
▌5. Marty Meehan (D)
▌6. Peter G. Torkildsen (R)
▌7. Ed Markey (D)
▌8. Joseph P. Kennedy II (D)
▌9. Joe Moakley (D)
▌10. Gerry Studds (D)

==== Michigan ====
▌1. Bart Stupak (D)
▌2. Pete Hoekstra (R)
▌3. Vern Ehlers (R)
▌4. Dave Camp (R)
▌5. James A. Barcia (D)
▌6. Fred Upton (R)
▌7. Nick Smith (R)
▌8. Dick Chrysler (R)
▌9. Dale Kildee (D)
▌10. David Bonior (D)
▌11. Joe Knollenberg (R)
▌12. Sander Levin (D)
▌13. Lynn N. Rivers (D)
▌14. John Conyers (D)
▌15. Barbara-Rose Collins (D)
▌16. John Dingell (D)

==== Minnesota ====
▌1. Gil Gutknecht (R)
▌2. David Minge (DFL)
▌3. Jim Ramstad (R)
▌4. Bruce Vento (DFL)
▌5. Martin Olav Sabo (DFL)
▌6. Bill Luther (DFL)
▌7. Collin Peterson (DFL)
▌8. Jim Oberstar (DFL)

==== Mississippi ====
▌1. Roger Wicker (R)
▌2. Bennie Thompson (D)
▌3. Sonny Montgomery (D)
▌▌4. Michael Parker (D, then R)
▌5. Gene Taylor (D)

==== Missouri ====
▌1. Bill Clay (D)
▌2. Jim Talent (R)
▌3. Dick Gephardt (D)
▌4. Ike Skelton (D)
▌5. Karen McCarthy (D)
▌6. Pat Danner (D)
▌7. Mel Hancock (R)
▌8. Bill Emerson (R), until June 22, 1996

▌Jo Ann Emerson (R), from November 5, 1996

▌9. Harold Volkmer (D)

==== Montana ====
▌At-large. Pat Williams (D)

==== Nebraska ====
▌1. Doug Bereuter (R)
▌2. Jon Lynn Christensen (R)
▌3. Bill Barrett (R)

==== Nevada ====
▌1. John Ensign (R)
▌2. Barbara Vucanovich (R)

==== New Hampshire ====
▌1. Bill Zeliff (R)
▌2. Charles Bass (R)

==== New Jersey ====
▌1. Rob Andrews (D)
▌2. Frank LoBiondo (R)
▌3. Jim Saxton (R)
▌4. Chris Smith (R)
▌5. Marge Roukema (R)
▌6. Frank Pallone (D)
▌7. Bob Franks (R)
▌8. William J. Martini (R)
▌9. Robert Torricelli (D)
▌10. Donald M. Payne (D)
▌11. Rodney Frelinghuysen (R)
▌12. Dick Zimmer (R)
▌13. Bob Menendez (D)

==== New Mexico ====
▌1. Steven Schiff (R)
▌2. Joe Skeen (R)
▌3. Bill Richardson (D)

==== New York ====
▌1. Michael Forbes (R)
▌2. Rick Lazio (R)
▌3. Peter T. King (R)
▌4. Dan Frisa (R)
▌5. Gary Ackerman (D)
▌6. Floyd Flake (D)
▌7. Thomas J. Manton (D)
▌8. Jerry Nadler (D)
▌9. Chuck Schumer (D)
▌10. Edolphus Towns (D)
▌11. Major Owens (D)
▌12. Nydia Velázquez (D)
▌13. Susan Molinari (R)
▌14. Carolyn Maloney (D)
▌15. Charles Rangel (D)
▌16. José E. Serrano (D)
▌17. Eliot Engel (D)
▌18. Nita Lowey (D)
▌19. Sue W. Kelly (R)
▌20. Benjamin Gilman (R)
▌21. Michael R. McNulty (D)
▌22. Gerald Solomon (R)
▌23. Sherwood Boehlert (R)
▌24. John M. McHugh (R)
▌25. James T. Walsh (R)
▌26. Maurice Hinchey (D)
▌27. Bill Paxon (R)
▌28. Louise Slaughter (D)
▌29. John J. LaFalce (D)
▌30. Jack Quinn (R)
▌31. Amo Houghton (R)

==== North Carolina ====
▌1. Eva Clayton (D)
▌2. David Funderburk (R)
▌3. Walter B. Jones Jr. (R)
▌4. Fred Heineman (R)
▌5. Richard Burr (R)
▌6. Howard Coble (R)
▌7. Charlie Rose (D)
▌8. Bill Hefner (D)
▌9. Sue Myrick (R)
▌10. Cass Ballenger (R)
▌11. Charles H. Taylor (R)
▌12. Mel Watt (D)

==== North Dakota ====
▌At-large. Earl Pomeroy (D)

==== Ohio ====
▌1. Steve Chabot (R)
▌2. Rob Portman (R)
▌3. Tony P. Hall (D)
▌4. Mike Oxley (R)
▌5. Paul Gillmor (R)
▌6. Frank Cremeans (R)
▌7. Dave Hobson (R)
▌8. John Boehner (R)
▌9. Marcy Kaptur (D)
▌10. Martin Hoke (R)
▌11. Louis Stokes (D)
▌12. John Kasich (R)
▌13. Sherrod Brown (D)
▌14. Thomas C. Sawyer (D)
▌15. Deborah Pryce (R)
▌16. Ralph Regula (R)
▌17. Jim Traficant (D)
▌18. Bob Ney (R)
▌19. Steve LaTourette (R)

==== Oklahoma ====
▌1. Steve Largent (R)
▌2. Tom Coburn (R)
▌3. William K. Brewster (D)
▌4. J. C. Watts (R)
▌5. Ernest Istook (R)
▌6. Frank Lucas (R)

==== Oregon ====
▌1. Elizabeth Furse (D)
▌2. Wes Cooley (R)
▌3. Ron Wyden (D), until February 6, 1996

▌Earl Blumenauer (D), from May 21, 1996

▌4. Peter DeFazio (D)
▌5. Jim Bunn (R)

==== Pennsylvania ====
▌1. Thomas M. Foglietta (D)
▌2. Chaka Fattah (D)
▌3. Robert A. Borski Jr. (D)
▌4. Ron Klink (D)
▌5. William F. Clinger Jr. (R)
▌6. Tim Holden (D)
▌7. Curt Weldon (R)
▌8. James C. Greenwood (R)
▌9. Bud Shuster (R)
▌10. Joseph M. McDade (R)
▌11. Paul Kanjorski (D)
▌12. John Murtha (D)
▌13. Jon D. Fox (R)
▌14. William J. Coyne (D)
▌15. Paul McHale (D)
▌16. Robert Smith Walker (R)
▌17. George Gekas (R)
▌18. Mike Doyle (D)
▌19. William F. Goodling (R)
▌20. Frank Mascara (D)
▌21. Phil English (R)

==== Rhode Island ====
▌1. Patrick J. Kennedy (D)
▌2. Jack Reed (D)

==== South Carolina ====
▌1. Mark Sanford (R)
▌2. Floyd Spence (R)
▌3. Lindsey Graham (R)
▌4. Bob Inglis (R)
▌5. John Spratt (D)
▌6. Jim Clyburn (D)

==== South Dakota ====
▌At-large. Tim Johnson (D)

==== Tennessee ====
▌1. Jimmy Quillen (R)
▌2. Jimmy Duncan (R)
▌3. Zach Wamp (R)
▌4. Van Hilleary (R)
▌5. Bob Clement (D)
▌6. Bart Gordon (D)
▌7. Ed Bryant (R)
▌8. John S. Tanner (D)
▌9. Harold Ford Sr. (D)

==== Texas ====
▌1. Jim Chapman (D)
▌2. Charlie Wilson (D), until October 8, 1996
▌3. Sam Johnson (R)
▌4. Ralph Hall (D)
▌5. John Wiley Bryant (D)
▌6. Joe Barton (R)
▌7. Bill Archer (R)
▌8. Jack Fields (R)
▌9. Steve Stockman (R)
▌10. Lloyd Doggett (D)
▌11. Chet Edwards (D)
▌12. Pete Geren (D)
▌13. Mac Thornberry (R)
▌▌14. Greg Laughlin (D, then R)
▌15. Kika de la Garza (D)
▌16. Ronald D. Coleman (D)
▌17. Charles Stenholm (D)
▌18. Sheila Jackson Lee (D)
▌19. Larry Combest (R)
▌20. Henry B. González (D)
▌21. Lamar Smith (R)
▌22. Tom DeLay (R)
▌23. Henry Bonilla (R)
▌24. Martin Frost (D)
▌25. Ken Bentsen Jr. (D)
▌26. Dick Armey (R)
▌27. Solomon P. Ortiz (D)
▌28. Frank Tejeda (D)
▌29. Gene Green (D)
▌30. Eddie Bernice Johnson (D)

==== Utah ====
▌1. James V. Hansen (R)
▌2. Enid Greene Waldholtz (R)
▌3. Bill Orton (D)

==== Vermont ====
▌At-large. Bernie Sanders (I)

==== Virginia ====
▌1. Herbert H. Bateman (R)
▌2. Owen B. Pickett (D)
▌3. Bobby Scott (D)
▌4. Norman Sisisky (D)
▌5. Lewis F. Payne Jr. (D)
▌6. Bob Goodlatte (R)
▌7. Thomas J. Bliley Jr. (R)
▌8. Jim Moran (D)
▌9. Rick Boucher (D)
▌10. Frank Wolf (R)
▌11. Tom Davis (R)

==== Washington ====
▌1. Rick White (R)
▌2. Jack Metcalf (R)
▌3. Linda Smith (R)
▌4. Doc Hastings (R)
▌5. George Nethercutt (R)
▌6. Norm Dicks (D)
▌7. Jim McDermott (D)
▌8. Jennifer Dunn (R)
▌9. Randy Tate (R)

==== West Virginia ====
▌1. Alan Mollohan (D)
▌2. Bob Wise (D)
▌3. Nick Rahall (D)

==== Wisconsin ====
▌1. Mark Neumann (R)
▌2. Scott L. Klug (R)
▌3. Steve Gunderson (R)
▌4. Jerry Kleczka (D)
▌5. Tom Barrett (D)
▌6. Tom Petri (R)
▌7. Dave Obey (D)
▌8. Toby Roth (R)
▌9. Jim Sensenbrenner (R)

==== Wyoming ====
▌At-large. Barbara Cubin (R)

==== Non-voting members ====
▌American Samoa. Eni Faleomavaega (D)
▌District of Columbia. Eleanor Holmes Norton (D)
▌Guam. Robert A. Underwood (D)
▌Virgin Islands. Victor O. Frazer (I)
▌Puerto Rico. Carlos Romero Barceló (Resident Commissioner) (D)

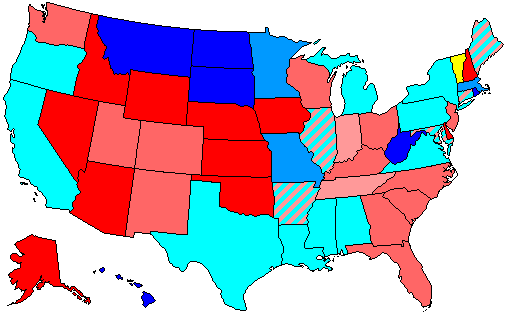
House seats by party holding majority in state: 80+ to 100% Republican / 80+ to 100% Democratic; 60+ to 80% Republican / 60+ to 80% Democratic; 50+ to 60% Republican / 50+ to 60% Democratic; striped: evenly split 100% independent

House majority leadership

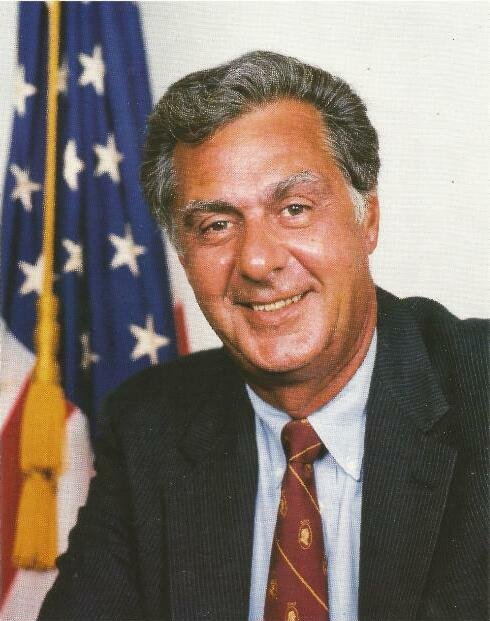
Republican leader
Dick Armey

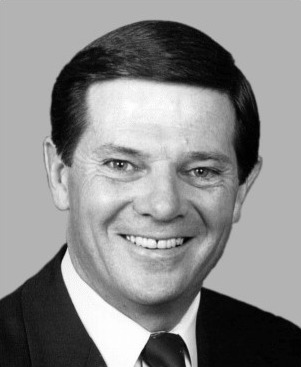
Republican whip
Tom DeLay

House minority leadership

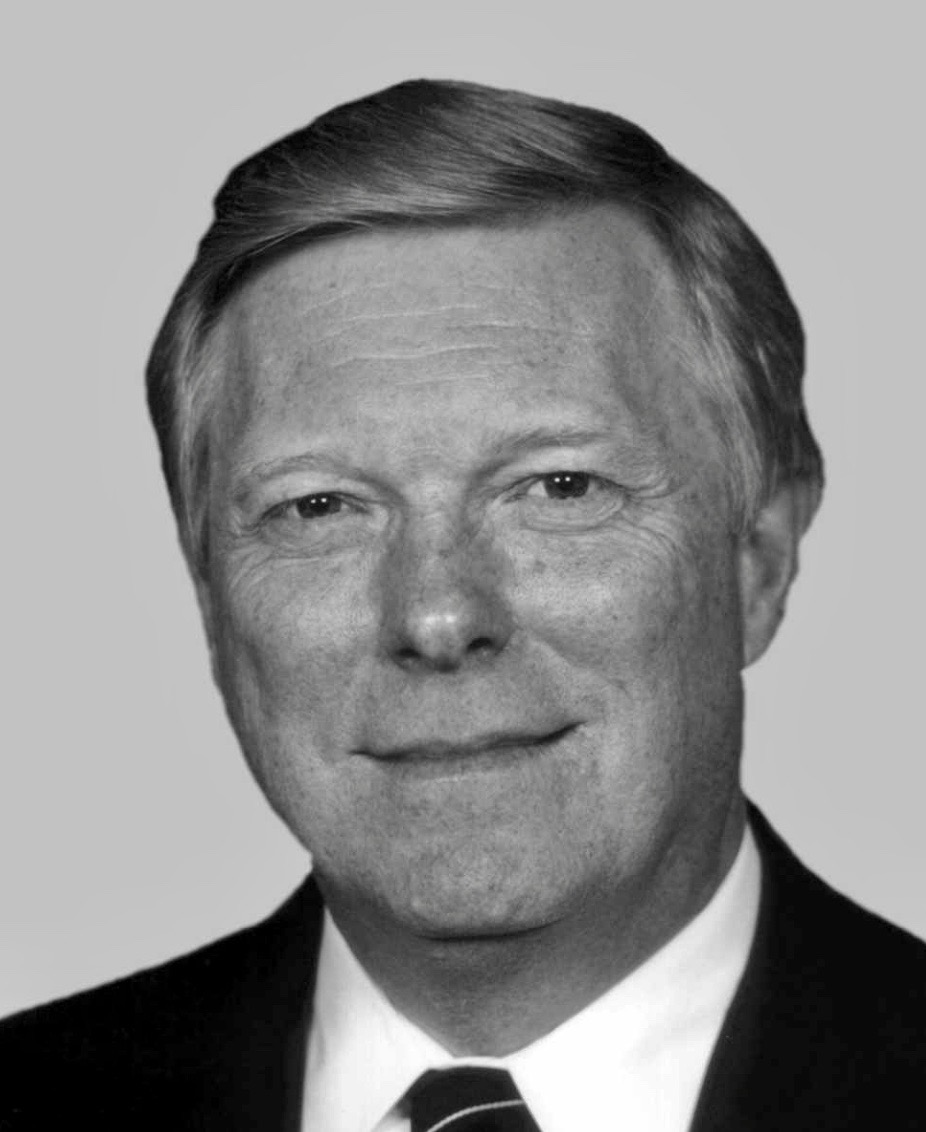
Democratic leader
Dick Gephardt

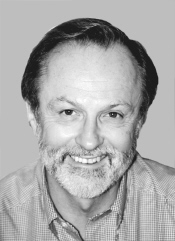
Democratic whip
David Bonior

== Changes in membership ==
=== Senate ===
Senate changes
State (class)	Vacated by	Reason for change	Successor	Date of successor's formal installation (Note: When seated or oath administered, not necessarily when service began.)
Colorado (3)	Ben Nighthorse Campbell (D)	Changed party March 3, 1995	Ben Nighthorse Campbell (R)	March 3, 1995
Oregon (3)	Bob Packwood (R)	Resigned September 7, 1995 after the Senate Ethics Committee recommended expulsion 6-0 over Packwood's sexual misconduct. Successor elected January 30, 1996 to the remainder of the term ending on January 3, 1999.	Ron Wyden (D)	Seated February 6, 1996
Kansas (3)	Bob Dole (R)	Incumbent resigned on June 11, 1996, to campaign for the Presidency. Successor was appointed the same day to continue the term.	Sheila Frahm (R)	June 11, 1996
Kansas (3)	Sheila Frahm (R)	Interim appointee lost nomination. Successor elected November 5, 1996 to the remainder of the term ending on January 3, 1999.	Sam Brownback (R)	November 6, 1996

=== House of Representatives ===
House changes
District	Vacated by	Reason for change	Successor	Date of successor's formal installation
Georgia 9th	Nathan Deal (D)	Changed party April 10, 1995	Nathan Deal (R)	April 10, 1995
Texas 14th	Greg Laughlin (D)	Changed party June 26, 1995	Greg Laughlin (R)	June 26, 1995
Louisiana 3rd	Billy Tauzin (D)	Changed party August 8, 1995	Billy Tauzin (R)	August 8, 1995
Illinois 2nd	Mel Reynolds (D)	Resigned October 1, 1995	Jesse Jackson Jr. (D)	December 15, 1995
California 15th	Norman Mineta (D)	Resigned October 10, 1995	Tom Campbell (R)	December 12, 1995
Mississippi 4th	Michael Parker (D)	Changed party November 10, 1995	Michael Parker (R)	November 10, 1995
Louisiana 7th	Jimmy Hayes (D)	Changed party December 1, 1995	Jimmy Hayes (R)	December 1, 1995
California 37th	Walter R. Tucker III (D)	Resigned December 15, 1995, due to scandals during his past tenure as Mayor of Compton	Juanita Millender-McDonald (D)	March 26, 1996
Oregon 3rd	Ron Wyden (D)	Resigned February 6, 1996, after being elected to the U.S. Senate	Earl Blumenauer (D)	May 21, 1996
Maryland 7th	Kweisi Mfume (D)	Resigned February 15, 1996, to become CEO of the NAACP	Elijah Cummings (D)	April 16, 1996
Missouri 8th	Bill Emerson (R)	Died June 22, 1996	Jo Ann Emerson (I/R)	November 5, 1996
Kansas 2nd	Sam Brownback (R)	Resigned November 27, 1996, retroactive to November 7 after being elected to the US Senate	Jim Ryun (R)	November 27, 1996
Arkansas 2nd	Ray Thornton (D)	Resigned January 1, 1997	Vacant	Vacant for remainder of term
Arkansas 3rd	Tim Hutchinson (R)	Resigned January 2, 1997, after being elected to the US Senate	Vacant	Vacant for remainder of term

== Committees ==
Lists of committees and their party leaders for members of the House and Senate committees can be found through the Official Congressional Directory at the bottom of this article. The directory after the pages of terms of service lists committees of the Senate, House (Standing with Subcommittees, Select and Special) and Joint and, after that, House/Senate committee assignments. On the committees section of the House and Senate in the Official Congressional Directory, the committee's members on the first row on the left side shows the chairman of the committee and on the right side shows the ranking member of the committee.

=== Senate ===
- Aging (Special) (William S. Cohen, Chair; David Pryor, Ranking Member)
- Agriculture, Nutrition and Forestry (Richard Lugar, Chair; Patrick Leahy, Ranking Member)
  - Forestry, Conservation and Rural Revitalization (Larry E. Craig, Chair; Howell Heflin, Ranking Member)
  - Marketing, Inspection and Product Promotion (Jesse Helms, Chair; Kent Conrad, Ranking Member)
  - Research, Nutrition and General Legislation (Thad Cochran, Chair; David Pryor, Ranking Member)
- Appropriations (Mark Hatfield, Chair; Robert C. Byrd, Ranking Member)
  - Agriculture, Rural Development and Related Agencies (Thad Cochran, Chair; Dale Bumpers, Ranking Member)
  - Commerce, Justice, State and Judiciary (Phil Gramm, Chair; Ernest Hollings, Ranking Member)
  - Defense (Ted Stevens, Chair; Daniel Inouye, Ranking Member)
  - District of Columbia (Jim Jeffords, Chair; Herb Kohl, Ranking Member)
  - Energy and Water Development (Pete Domenici, Chair; J. Bennett Johnston, Ranking Member)
  - Foreign Operations (Mitch McConnell, Chair; Patrick Leahy, Ranking Member)
  - Interior and Related Agencies (Slade Gorton, Chair; Robert C. Byrd, Ranking Member)
  - Labor, Health, Human Services and Education (Arlen Specter, Chair; Tom Harkin, Ranking Member)
  - Legislative Branch (Connie Mack III, Chair; Patty Murray, Ranking Member)
  - Military Construction (Conrad Burns, Chair; Harry Reid, Ranking Member)
  - Transportation (Mark Hatfield, Chair; Frank Lautenberg, Ranking Member)
  - Treasury, Postal Service and General Government (Richard Shelby, Chair; J. Robert Kerrey, Ranking Member)
  - VA-HUD Independent Agencies (Kit Bond, Chair; Barbara A. Mikulski, Ranking Member)
- Armed Services (Strom Thurmond, Chair; Sam Nunn, Ranking Member)
  - Acquisition and Technology (Bob Smith, Chair; Jeff Bingaman, Ranking Member)
  - Airland Forces (John Warner, Chair; Carl Levin, Ranking Member)
  - Personnel (Dan Coats, Chair; Robert Byrd, Ranking Member)
  - Readiness (John McCain, Chair; John Glenn, Ranking Member)
  - Seapower (William S. Cohen, Chair; Edward M. Kennedy, Ranking Member)
  - Strategic Forces (Trent Lott, Chair; J. James Exon, Ranking Member)
- Banking, Housing and Urban Affairs (Al D'Amato, Chair; Paul Sarbanes, Ranking Member)
  - Securities (Phil Gramm, Chair; Chris Dodd, Ranking Member)
  - Financial Institutions and Regulatory Relief (Richard Shelby, Chair; Richard Bryan, Ranking Member)
  - International Finance (Kit Bond, Chair; Barbara Boxer, Ranking Member)
  - Housing Opportunity and Community Development (Connie Mack III, Chair; John F. Kerry, Ranking Member)
  - HUD Oversight and Activities (Lauch Faircloth, Chair; Carol Moseley-Braun, Ranking Member)
- Budget (Pete Domenici, Chair; J. James Exon, Ranking Member)
- Commerce, Science and Transportation (Larry Pressler, Chair; Ernest F. Hollings, Ranking Member)
  - Aviation (John McCain, Chair; Wendell H. Ford, Ranking Member)
  - Communications (Bob Packwood, Chair; Ernest F. Hollings, Ranking Member)
  - Consumer Affairs, Foreign Commerce and Tourism (Slade Gorton, Chair; J. James Exon, Ranking Member)
  - Oceans and Fisheries (Ted Stevens, Chair; John F. Kerry, Ranking Member)
  - Science, Technology and Space (Conrad Burns, Chair; John D. Rockefeller IV, Ranking Member)
  - Surface Transportation and Merchant Marine (Trent Lott, Chair; Daniel K. Inouye, Ranking Member)
- Energy and Natural Resources (Frank H. Murkowski, Chair; J. Bennett Johnston, Ranking Member)
  - Energy Production and Regulation (Don Nickles, Chair; Jeff Bingaman, Ranking Member)
  - Energy Research and Development (Pete Domenici, Chair; Wendell H. Ford, Ranking Member)
  - Forests and Public Land Management (Larry E. Craig, Chair; Bill Bradley, Ranking Member)
  - Parks, Historic Preservation and Recreation (Ben Nighthorse Campbell, Chair; Dale Bumpers, Ranking Member)
  - Oversight and Investigations (Craig Thomas, Chair; Daniel Akaka, Ranking Member)
- Environment and Public Works (John H. Chafee, Chair; Max Baucus, Ranking Member)
  - Clear Air, Wetlands, Private Property and Nuclear Safety (Lauch Faircloth, Chair; Bob Graham, Ranking Member)
  - Drinking Water, Fisheries and Wildlife (Dirk Kempthorne, Chair; Harry Reid, Ranking Member)
  - Superfund, Waste Control and Risk Assessment (Bob Smith, Chair; Frank Lautenberg, Ranking Member)
  - Transportation and Infrastructure (John Warner, Chair; Max Baucus, Ranking Member)
- Ethics (Select) (Mitch McConnell, Chair; Richard H. Bryan, Ranking Member)
- Finance (Bob Packwood, Chair; Daniel Patrick Moynihan, Ranking Member)
  - International Trade (Chuck Grassley, Chair; Daniel Patrick Moynihan, Ranking Member)
  - Long-Term Growth, Debt and Deficit Reduction (Larry Pressler, Chair; David H. Pryor, Ranking Member)
  - Medicare, Long-Term Care and Health Insurance (John H. Chafee, Chair; Bob Graham, Ranking Member)
  - Medicaid and Health-Care for Low-Income Families (Bob Dole, Chair; John D. Rockefeller IV, Ranking Member)
  - Social Security and Family Policy (Alan K. Simpson, Chair; John B. Breaux, Ranking Member)
  - Taxation and IRS Oversight (Orrin G. Hatch, Chair; Bill Bradley, Ranking Member)
- Foreign Relations (Jesse Helms, Chair; Claiborne Pell, Ranking Member)
  - African Affairs (Nancy Kassebaum, Chair; Russ Feingold, Ranking Member)
  - East Asian and Pacific Affairs (Craig Thomas, Chair; Charles Robb, Ranking Member)
  - European Affairs (Richard Lugar, Chair; Joe Biden, Ranking Member)
  - International Economic Policy, Export and Trade Promotion (Fred Thompson, Chair; Paul S. Sarbanes, Ranking Member)
  - International Operations (Olympia Snowe, Chair; John Kerry, Ranking Member)
  - Near Eastern and South Asian Affairs (Hank Brown, Chair; Dianne Feinstein, Ranking Member)
  - Western Hemisphere and Peace Corps Affairs (Paul Coverdell, Chair; Chris Dodd, Ranking Member)
- Governmental Affairs (Bill Roth, Chair; John Glenn, Ranking Member)
  - Oversight of Government Management and the District of Columbia (William S. Cohen, Chair; Carl Levin, Ranking Member)
  - Permanent Subcommittee on Investigations (Bill Roth, Chair; Sam Nunn, Ranking Member)
  - International Economic Policy, Export and Trade Promotion (Fred Thompson, Chair; Paul Sarbanes, Ranking Member)
  - Post Office and Civil Service (Ted Stevens, Chair; David Pryor, Ranking Member)
- Indian Affairs (Select) (John McCain, Chair; Daniel K. Inouye, Ranking Member)
- Judiciary (Orrin G. Hatch, Chair; Joe Biden, Ranking Member)
  - Administration Oversight and the Courts (Chuck Grassley, Chair; Howell Heflin, Ranking Member)
  - Antitrust, Business Rights and Competition (Strom Thurmond, Chair; Patrick Leahy, Ranking Member)
  - Constitution, Federalism and Property Rights (Hank Brown, Chair; Paul Simon, Ranking Member)
  - Immigration (Alan K. Simpson, Chair; Edward M. Kennedy, Ranking Member)
  - Terrorism, Technology and Government Information (Arlen Specter, Chair; Herb Kohl, Ranking Member)
  - Youth Violence (Fred Thompson, Chair; Joe Biden, Ranking Member)
- Intelligence (Select) (Arlen Specter, Chair; J. Robert Kerrey, Vice Chair)
- Labor and Human Resources (Nancy Landon Kassebaum, Chair; Edward M. Kennedy, Ranking Member)
  - Aging (Judd Gregg, Chair; Barbara A. Mikulski, Ranking Member)
  - Children and Families (Dan Coats, Chair; Chris Dodd, Ranking Member)
  - Disability Policy (Bill Frist, Chair; Tom Harkin, Ranking Member)
  - Education, Arts and Humanities (Jim Jeffords, Chair; Claiborne Pell, Ranking Member)
- Rules and Administration (Ted Stevens, Chair; Wendell H. Ford, Ranking Member)
- Small Business (Kit Bond, Chair; Dale Bumpers, Ranking Member)
- Veterans' Affairs (Alan K. Simpson, Chair; John D. Rockefeller IV, Ranking Member)
- Whitewater Committee (Special) (Al D'Amato, Chair; Paul Sarbanes, Ranking Member)

=== House of Representatives ===
- Agriculture (Pat Roberts, Chair; Kika de la Garza, Ranking Member)
  - General Farm Commodities (Bill Barrett, Chair; Charles W. Stenholm, Ranking Member)
  - Livestock, Dairy and Poultry (Steve Gunderson, Chair; Harold Volkmer, Ranking Member)
  - Risk Management and Specialty Crops (Thomas W. Ewing, Chair; Charlie Rose, Ranking Member)
  - Department Operations, Nutrition and Foreign Agriculture (Bill Emerson, Chair; Gary A. Condit, Ranking Member)
  - Resource Conservation, Research and Forestry (Wayne Allard, Chair; Tim Johnson, Ranking Member)
- Appropriations (Bob Livingston, Chair; Dave Obey, Ranking Member)
  - Agriculture, Rural Development, Food and Drug Administration and Related Agencies (Joe Skeen, Chair; Dick Durbin, Ranking Member)
  - Commerce, Justice, State and Judiciary (Hal Rogers, Chair; Alan B. Mollohan, Ranking Member)
  - District of Columbia (James T. Walsh, Chair; Julian Dixon, Ranking Member)
  - Energy and Water Development (John T. Myers, Chair; Tom Bevill, Ranking Member)
  - Foreign Operations, Export Financing and Related Programs (Sonny Callahan, Chair; Charlie Wilson, Ranking Member)
  - Labor, Health, Human Services and Education (John Edward Porter, Chair; David Obey, Ranking Member)
  - Interior (Ralph Regula, Chair; Sidney Yates, Ranking Member)
  - Legislative (Ron Packard, Chair; Vic Fazio, Ranking Member)
  - Military Construction (Barbara Vucanovich, Chair; Bill Hefner, Ranking Member)
  - National Security (Bill Young, Chair; John Murtha, Ranking Member)
  - Transportation (Frank Wolf, Chair; Martin Olav Sabo, Ranking Member)
  - Treasury, Postal Service and General Government (Jim Lightfoot, Chair; Steny Hoyer, Ranking Member)
  - VA, HUD and Independent Agencies (Jerry Lewis, Chair; Louis Stokes, Ranking Member)
- Banking and Financial Services (Jim Leach, Chair; Henry B. Gonzalez, Ranking Member)
  - Capital Markets, Securities and Government-Sponsored Enterprises (Richard H. Baker, Chair; Paul E. Kanjorski, Ranking Member)
  - Domestic and International Monetary Policy (Michael Castle, Chair; Floyd Flake, Ranking Member)
  - Financial Institutions and Consumer Credit (Marge Roukema, Chair; Bruce Vento, Ranking Member)
  - General Oversight and Investigations (Spencer Bachus, Chair; Kweisi Mfume, Ranking Member)
  - Housing and Community Opportunity (Rick Lazio, Chair; Joseph P. Kennedy II, Ranking Member)
- Budget (John Kasich, Chair; Martin Olav Sabo, Ranking Member)
- Commerce (Thomas J. Bliley, Chair; John D. Dingell, Ranking Member)
  - Commerce, Trade and Hazardous Materials (Mike Oxley, Chair; Billy Tauzin, Ranking Member)
  - Energy and Power (Dan Schaefer, Chair; Frank Pallone, Ranking Member)
  - Health and Environment (Michael Bilirakis, Chair; Henry A. Waxman, Ranking Member)
  - Oversight and Investigations (Joe Barton, Chair; Ron Wyden, Ranking Member)
  - Telecommunications and Finance (Jack Fields, Chair; Edward J. Markey, Ranking Member)
- Economic and Educational Opportunities (Bill Goodling, Chair; Bill Clay, Ranking Member)
  - Early Childhood, Youth and Families (Duke Cunningham, Chair; Dale E. Kildee, Ranking Member)
  - Employer-Employee Relations (Harris W. Fawell, Chair; Matthew G. Martinez, Ranking Member)
  - Oversight and Investigations (Peter Hoekstra, Chair; Thomas C. Sawyer, Ranking Member)
  - Postsecondary Education, Training and Life-Long Learning (Buck McKeon, Chair; Pat Williams, Ranking Member)
  - Workforce Protections (Cass Ballenger, Chair; Major Owens, Ranking Member)
- Government Reform and Oversight (William F. Clinger, Chair; Cardiss Collins, Ranking Member)
  - Civil Service (John Mica, Chair; Jim Moran, Ranking Member)
  - District of Columbia (Thomas M. Davis, Chair; Eleanor Holmes Norton, Ranking Member)
  - Government Management, Information and Technology (Steve Horn, Chair; Carolyn B. Maloney, Ranking Member)
  - Human Resources and Ingovernmental Relations (Chris Shays, Chair; Edolphus Towns, Ranking Member)
  - National Economic Growth, Natural Resources and Regulatory Affairs (David McIntosh, Chair; Collin C. Peterson, Ranking Member)
  - National Security, International Affairs and Criminal Justice (Bill Zeliff, Chair; Karen L. Thurman, Ranking Member)
  - Postal Service (John M. McHugh, Chair; Barbara-Rose Collins, Ranking Member)
- House Administration (Bill Thomas, Chair; Vic Fazio, Ranking Member)
- International Relations (Benjamin Gilman, Chair; Lee H. Hamilton, Ranking Member)
  - International Economic Policy and Trade (Toby Roth, Chair; Sam Gejdenson, Ranking Member)
  - Asia and the Pacific (Doug Bereuter, Chair; Howard Berman, Ranking Member)
  - International Operations and Human Rights (Christopher H. Smith, Chair; Tom Lantos, Ranking Member)
  - Western Hemisphere (Dan Burton, Chair; Robert G. Torricelli, Ranking Member)
  - Africa (Ileana Ros-Lehtinen, Chair; Gary L. Ackerman, Ranking Member)
- Judiciary (Henry J. Hyde, Chair; John Conyers, Ranking Member)
  - Commercial and Administrative Law (George W. Gekas, Chair; Jack Reed, Ranking Member)
  - Courts and Intellectual Property (Carlos J. Moorhead, Chair; Patricia Schroeder, Ranking Member)
  - Crime (Bill McCollum, Chair; Chuck Schumer, Ranking Member)
  - Immigration and Claims (Lamar S. Smith, Chair; John Bryant, Ranking Member)
  - The Constitution (Charles T. Canady, Chair; Barney Frank, Ranking Member)
- National Security (Floyd D. Spence, Chair; Ron Dellums, Ranking Member)
  - Military Installations and Facilities (Joel Hefley, Chair; Solomon P. Ortiz, Ranking Member)
  - Military Personnel (Bob Dornan, Chair; Owen B. Pickett, Ranking Member)
  - Military Procurement (Duncan Hunter, Chair; Ike Skelton, Ranking Member)
  - Military Readiness (Herbert H. Bateman, Chair; Norman Sisisky, Ranking Member)
  - Military Research and Development (Curt Weldon, Chair; John M. Spratt, Ranking Member)
- Resources (Don Young, Chair; George Miller, Ranking Member)
  - Energy and Mineral Resources (Ken Calvert, Chair; Neil Abercrombie, Ranking Member)
  - Fisheries, Wildlife and Oceans (Jim Saxton, Chair; Gerry E. Studds, Ranking Member)
  - National Parks, Forests and Lands (James V. Hansen, Chair; Bill Richardson, Ranking Member)
  - Native American and Insular Affairs (Elton Gallegly, Chair; Eni Faleomavaega, Ranking Member)
  - Water and Power Resources (John T. Doolittle, Chair; Peter A. DeFazio, Ranking Member)
- Rules (Gerald B.H. Solomon, Chair; Joe Moakley, Ranking Member)
  - Legislative Process (Porter Goss, Chair; Martin Frost, Ranking Member)
  - Rules of the House (David Dreier, Chair; Anthony C. Beilenson, Ranking Member)
- Science (Robert S. Walker, Chair; George E. Brown Jr., Ranking Member)
  - Basic Research (Steven Schiff, Chair; Pete Geren, Ranking Member)
  - Energy and Development (Dana Rohrabacher, Chair; James A. Hayes, Ranking Member)
  - Space and Aeronautics (Jim Sensenbrenner, Chair; Ralph M. Hall, Ranking Member)
  - Technology (Constance A. Morella, Chair; John S. Tanner, Ranking Member)
- Small Business (Jan Meyers, Chair; John L. LaFalce, Ranking Member)
  - Government Programs (Peter G. Torkildsen, Chair; Glenn Poshard, Ranking Member)
  - Procurement, Exports and Business Opportunities (Donald A. Manzullo, Chair; Eva Clayton, Ranking Member)
  - Regulation and Paperwork (Jim Talent, Chair; Nydia Velázquez, Ranking Member)
  - Tax and Finance (Linda Smith, Chair; Marty Meehan, Ranking Member)
- Standards of Official Conduct (Nancy Johnson, Chair; Jim McDermott, Ranking Member)
- Transportation and Infrastructure (Bud Shuster, Chair; Norman Mineta, Ranking Member)
  - Aviation (John J. Duncan Jr., Chair; James L. Oberstar, Ranking Member)
  - Coast Guard and Maritime Transportation (Howard Coble, Chair; James A. Traficant, Ranking Member)
  - Public Buildings and Economic Development (Wayne T. Gilchrest, Chair; Robert E. Wise Jr., Ranking Member)
  - Railroads (Susan Molinari, Chair; William O. Lipinski, Ranking Member)
  - Surface Transportation (Tom Petri, Chair; Nick J. Rahall, Ranking Member)
  - Water Resources and Development (Sherwood Boehlert, Chair; Robert A. Borski, Ranking Member)
- Veterans' Affairs (Bob Stump, Chair; Sonny Montgomery, Ranking Member)
  - Compensation, Pension, Insurance and Memorial Affairs (Terry Everett, Chair; Lane Evans, Ranking Member)
  - Education, Training, Employment and Housing (Steve Buyer, Chair; Maxine Waters, Ranking Member)
  - Hospitals and Health Care (Tim Hutchinson, Chair; Chet Edwards, Ranking Member)
- Ways and Means (Bill Archer, Chair; Sam Gibbons, Ranking Member)
  - Health (Bill Thomas, Chair; Charles Rangel, Ranking Member)
  - Human Resources (E. Clay Shaw Jr., Chair; Harold E. Ford Sr., Ranking Member)
  - Oversight (Nancy Johnson, Chair; Bob Matsui, Ranking Member)
  - Social Security (Jim Bunning, Chair; Andrew Jacobs Jr., Ranking Member)
  - Trade (Phil Crane, Chair; Charles Rangel, Ranking Member)
- Whole

=== Joint committees ===
- Economic (Sen. Connie Mack, Chair; Rep. Jim Saxton, Vice Chair)
- Taxation (Rep. Bill Archer, Chair; Sen. Bob Packwood, Vice Chair)
- The Library (Sen. Mark Hatfield, Chair; Rep. Bill Thomas, Vice Chair)
- Printing (Rep. Bill Thomas, Chair; Sen. Ted Stevens, Vice Chair)

== Employees ==
=== Legislative branch agency directors ===
- Architect of the Capitol:
  - George Malcolm White, until November 21, 1995
  - William L. Ensign (acting), from November 21, 1995
- Attending Physician of the United States Congress: John F. Eisold
- Comptroller General of the United States:
  - Charles A. Bowsher, until 1996
  - vacant, starting 1996
- Director of the Congressional Budget Office:
  - Robert D. Reischauer, until February 28, 1995
  - June E. O'Neill, from March 1, 1995
- Librarian of Congress: James H. Billington
- Public Printer of the United States: Michael F. DiMario

=== Senate ===
- Chaplain:
  - Richard C. Halverson (Presbyterian), until March 11, 1995
  - Lloyd John Ogilvie (Presbyterian), from March 11, 1995
- Curator:
  - James R. Ketchum, until July 1, 1995
  - Diane K. Skvarla, from July 1, 1995
- Historian: Richard A. Baker
- Parliamentarian: Bob Dove
- Secretary:
  - Sheila P. Burke, until June 7, 1995
  - Kelly D. Johnston, June 8, 1995 – September 30, 1996
  - Gary Lee Sisco, from October 1, 1996
- Librarian: Roger K. Haley
- Secretary for the Majority: Elizabeth B. Greene
- Secretary for the Minority:
  - C. Abbott Saffold, until 1995
  - Martin P. Paone, from 1995
- Sergeant at Arms:
  - Howard O. Greene Jr., until September 6, 1996
  - Gregory S. Casey, from September 6, 1996

=== House of Representatives ===
- Chaplain: James D. Ford (Lutheran)
- Chief Administrative Officer:
  - Scott Faulkner, until November 22, 1996
  - Jeff Trandahl (acting), from November 22, 1996
- Clerk: Robin H. Carle
- Historian: Christina Jeffrey, 1995 (briefly)
- Parliamentarian: Charles W. Johnson III
- Reading Clerks: Meg Goetz (D) and Paul Hays (R)
- Sergeant at Arms: Wilson Livingood
- Inspector General: John W. Lainhart IV

== See also ==
- List of new members of the 104th United States Congress
- 1994 United States elections (elections leading to this Congress)
  - 1994 United States Senate elections
  - 1994 United States House of Representatives elections
- 1996 United States elections (elections during this Congress, leading to the next Congress)
  - 1996 United States presidential election
  - 1996 United States Senate elections
  - 1996 United States House of Representatives elections
