= Daniel Beard =

Daniel Beard may refer to:

- Daniel Carter Beard (1850–1941), American illustrator, author, youth leader and social reformer
- Daniel P. Beard (born 1943), American politician
- Dan Beard (1850–1941), American artist, founder of the Sons of Daniel Boone
- Danny Beard (born 1992), British drag performer
