= Green the Capitol =

Green the Capitol was a March 2007 initiative, introduced by House of Representatives Speaker Nancy Pelosi, to make the United States Capitol a more environmentally sustainable workplace, and included proposals to make the millions of square feet of Capitol infrastructure a model of sustainability.

== Implementation and impact ==
The Speaker charged the Chief Administrative Officer (CAO) of the United States House of Representatives, Daniel P. Beard, with the task of making the House of Representatives a model of sustainability for the nation. Within a short period of time the program made significant progress in reducing energy consumption; greening all of the restaurants and cafeterias, reducing greenhouse gases; encouraging recycling reuse and diverting House waste from landfills; encouraging sustainable business practices in Legislative Agencies, Member Offices and Committees; and encouraging alternative transportation use for employee commuters to reduce traffic congestion and save energy.

Robert K. Lane initially was appointed as Executive Director of the program in 2008 and served in that capacity until July 2010, when Allison Rogers was appointed as Director. A major accomplishment of the Green the Capitol Initiative was to coordinate with the Architect of the Capitol to convert the antiquated Capitol Power Plant from predominant use of coal, to cleaner natural gas. This initiative substantially reduced the Capitol Campus' carbon emissions and contributed to the enhanced air quality of the Capitol Hill area.

On August 4, 2011, Daniel J. Strodel, succeeded Daniel P. Beard as CAO, and Stephen T. Ayers, AIA, LEED AP, Architect of the Capitol (AOC), announced that the AOC will assume and expand the House of Representatives' sustainability initiatives formerly conducted by the CAO. This will further improve efficiencies in the effort to reduce energy consumption on Capitol Hill.

The CAO's organization brought a number of sustainability issues to the forefront for the House of Representatives, and identified a number of energy and cost-savings measures that the AOC then carried out. To further improve efficiencies and educational resources Congress-wide, these initiatives will now be directed by the AOC whose mission it is to preserve and enhance the Capitol complex.

In 2010, the Architect of the Capitol installed 30,000 energy-efficient light fixtures, and converted 2,700 bathroom fixtures to automatic, low-flow units. These upgrades helped to achieve a 23.3 percent reduction in water consumption in the House Office Buildings from Fiscal Year 2009 to Fiscal Year 2010. In addition, approximately 1,250 bathroom fixtures were diverted from landfills and sent to a local asphalt plant for recycling. The AOC also installed a dimmable LED lighting technology in the Rayburn Cafeteria. In a matter of months, energy consumption for lighting in the cafeteria was reduced by more than 70 percent.

As a result of these efforts and others, Congress's energy reduction efforts have yielded great results. In Fiscal Year 2010, the Energy Independence and Security Act of 2007 (EISA 2007) goal was exceeded by reducing energy consumption 17 percent, beating the Fiscal Year 2010 requirement of a 15 percent reduction.
