= National Fish and Wildlife Foundation =

American foundation

National Fish and Wildlife Foundation (NFWF)
- Formation: 1983
- Type: Non-profit organization
- Headquarters: 1625 Eye St., N.W., Suite 300; Washington, D.C. 20006
- Coordinates: 38°54′5.6″N 77°02′15.3″W
- Region served: United States
- Executive Director: Jeff Trandahl
- Main organ: Board of Directors
- Website: www.nfwf.org

The National Fish and Wildlife Foundation (NFWF) is an American foundation that was chartered by the United States Congress in 1984 to increase the resources available for the conservation of the nation's fish, wildlife, plants, and habitats.

== Authority ==
The National Fish and Wildlife Foundation (NFWF) is dedicated to sustaining, restoring and enhancing the nation's fish, wildlife, plants, and habitats for current and future generations. The NFWF advances its mission through public and private partnerships, and by investing financial resources and intellectual capital into science-based programs designed to address conservation priorities.

In the 41 years since being chartered by Congress, the NFWF has become the country's largest private conservation grant-maker. NFWF-funded projects—more than 19,700 since its founding in 1984—have generated a cumulative conservation impact of more than $6.8 billion.

The NFWF uses collaborative efforts from individuals, corporations, charities, and other groups to achieve its goals.

The NFWF has used more than $1.5 billion of federal funding since its establishment, to leverage additional contributions from corporations, foundations and other sources. On average, the NFWF triples the value of every public dollar it receives, and uses science-based strategies to achieve measurable results. NFWF funds conservation efforts across the US, awarding grants to conservation organizations of all sizes.

The NFWF allocates 95 percent of its budget directly into priority actions in the US and globally, while the rest is used for administrative costs.

As part of its Congressional charter, the NFWF also serves as a neutral, third-party fiduciary to receive, manage and disburse funds that originate from court orders, settlements of legal cases, regulatory permits, licenses, and restoration and mitigation plans. The funds are managed under NFWF's Impact-Directed Environmental Account (IDEA) program. NFWF works with federal agencies, regional, state and local organizations, corporations and philanthropic institutions to apply these funds to conservation projects.

The NFWF is a public charity under the IRS tax code and treated as a private corporation established under Federal law. Under the terms of its enabling legislation, NFWF is required to report its proceedings and activities annually to Congress.

== Leadership ==
NFWF is governed by a 30-member board of directors approved by the Secretary of the Interior and including the heads of the U.S. Fish and Wildlife Service and NOAA. J. Michael Cline served as chairman of the board until his death in 2024.

Jeff Trandahl has been NFWF's CEO and executive director since 2005. Previously, Trandahl served as the 32nd Clerk of the United States House of Representatives. Other members of the leadership include Holly Bamford (chief conservation officer), Tokunbo Falayi (chief financial officer), and Daniel Strodel (chief administrative officer).

Team leaders

- Thomas Kelsch (senior vice president, Gulf Environmental Benefit Fund)
- Timothy DiCintio (senior vice president, impact-directed environmental accounts)
- Will Heaton (vice president, government relations)

Regional office directors

- Amanda Bassow (director, Northeastern Regional Office)
- Jonathan Birdsong (director, Western Regional Office)
- Todd Hogrefe (director, Central Regional Office)
- Jay Jensen (director, Southern Regional Office)
- Chris West (director, Rocky Mountain Regional Office)

== On the Gulf Coast ==
NFWF has been involved in conservation issues on the Gulf Coast of the United States for over two decades. Prior to the 2010 Deepwater Horizon explosion at a BP drilling platform, NFWF supported approximately 450 projects in the Gulf of Mexico with an estimated total value of $128 million. Between July 2010 and February 2012, NFWF administered $22.9 million under the Recovered Oil Fund for Wildlife and other funding sources to bolster the populations of Gulf species affected by the spill and develop conservation strategies to protect fish, wildlife and their habitats.

In the days immediately following the explosion, NFWF organized government agencies, non-profit organizations and corporations to identify the needs of the most imperiled wildlife and to develop effective responses. The priority focus was the species most at risk – sea turtles, shorebirds, water birds and migratory waterfowl – and the immediate actions needed to reduce losses. The explosion, which eventually released an estimated five million barrels of crude oil into the Gulf waters, occurred only weeks before the sea turtle nesting season and just prior to the seasonal migration of approximately one billion birds.

Following the crisis, NFWF collaborated with government agencies, non-profit organizations and corporations to develop a series of longer-term conservation strategies designed to ensure healthy populations of fish and wildlife in the Gulf. NFWF worked with farmers and other private landowners to create quality foraging sites for waterfowl, water birds and shorebirds inland from the Gulf danger zones and to increase survival rates by providing sufficient food and resting areas. NFWF also funded efforts to protect and restore critical nesting habitat, while increasing capacity on the Gulf Coast to manage important bird conservation areas. These projects enhanced more than 500,000 acres of habitat for migratory birds.

NFWF also worked with government agencies and FedEx Corporation to rescue approximately 25,000 sea turtle eggs from contamination in oiled waters. The eggs were dug out of their nests on the western shores of Florida and FedEx trucked overland to the state's unaffected eastern beaches. After incubation, the new hatchlings were released into the Atlantic Ocean. NFWF is working with other partners to increase nesting success on other Florida beaches, where 90 percent of all U.S. sea turtle nesting occurs. It has also funded efforts to reduce the mortality of juvenile and adult sea turtles at sea.

Other NFWF Gulf projects include promoting sustainable commercial and recreational fisheries and restoring oyster reefs to assist in providing crucial habitat and safeguard coastal communities.

NFWF, through the Gulf Environmental Benefit Fund, provided the bulk of funding for the purchase of Powderhorn Ranch. The 15,000 acres (6,100 ha) will be administered by the Wildlife Division of the Texas Parks and Wildlife as the newest Wildlife Management Area.

== Annual report ==
The Foundation publishes both an annual report and a conservation investments report every year. The annual report includes success stories from the previous fiscal year, as well as a financial summary, a list of corporate partners, federal partners, donors, board members and staff. The conservation investments report is a list of the grants that NFWF has awarded during the previous fiscal year.
