= Jeff Trandahl =

Clerk of the US House of Representatives (born 1964)

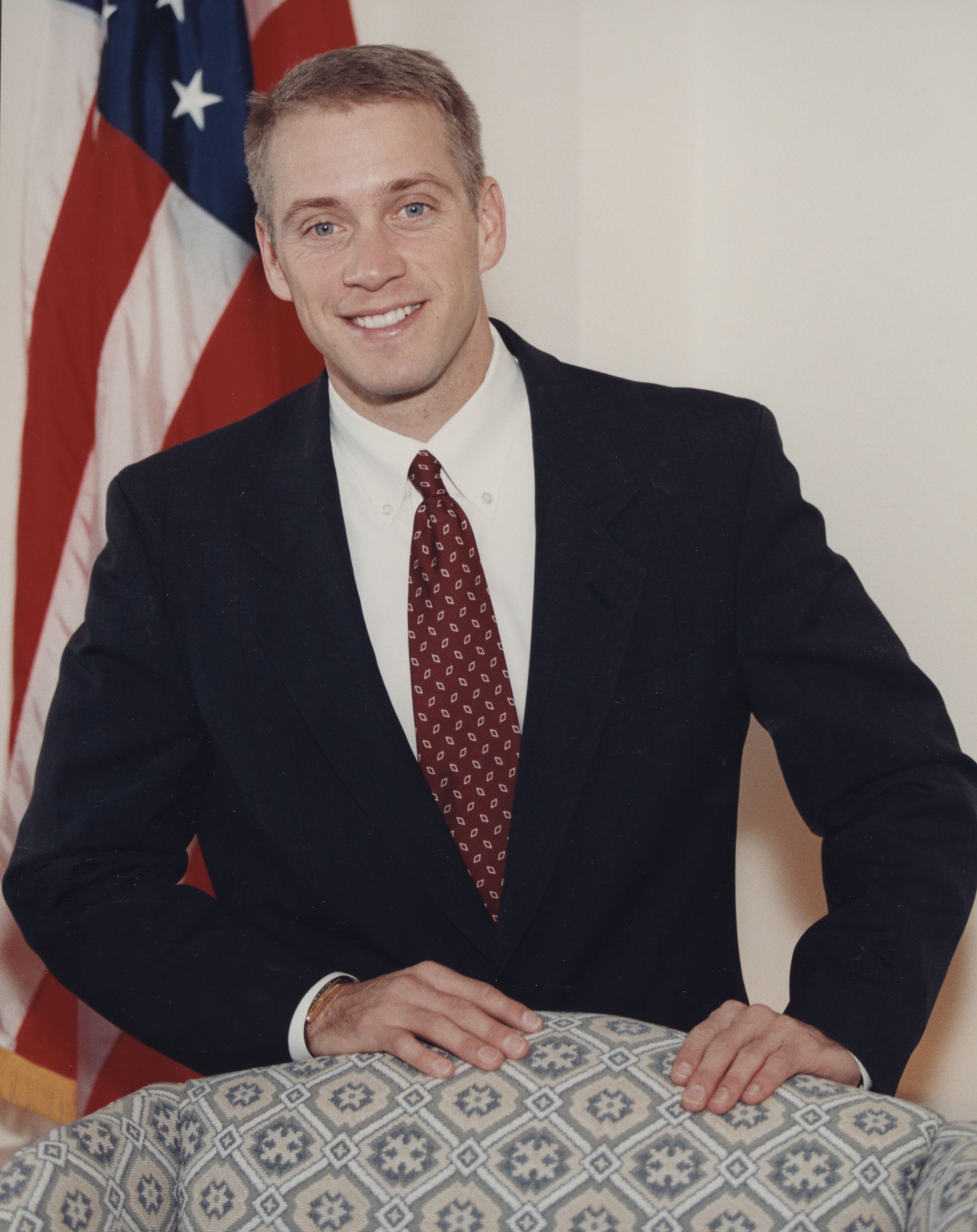

33rd Clerk of the U.S. House of Representatives
- In office January 6, 1999 – November 18, 2005
- Leader: Dennis Hastert
- Preceded by: Robin H. Carle
- Succeeded by: Karen L. Haas

Chief Administrative Officer of the United States House of Representatives Acting
- In office November 22, 1996 – July 31, 1997
- Preceded by: Scot Faulkner
- Succeeded by: James M. Eagen, III

Personal details
- Born: Jeffrey Joseph Trandahl; September 15, 1964 (age 61) Spearfish, South Dakota, U.S.
- Party: Republican
- Education: University of Maryland, College Park (BA)

Jeffrey Joseph Trandahl (born September 15, 1964) served as the thirty-third Clerk of the U.S. House of Representatives. He was elected Clerk on January 6, 1999, and held office until November 18, 2005. After leaving office, he was appointed CEO and executive director of the National Fish and Wildlife Foundation, a non-profit conservation organization created by Congress in 1984.

== Personal ==
Trandahl is a native of Spearfish, South Dakota, and graduated from Spearfish High School in 1983. He received a Bachelor of Arts from the University of Maryland in 1987 and a Certificate in Management from Harvard Kennedy School at Harvard University.

== Career ==
Trandahl began his congressional career in 1983 as an aide to Senator James Abdnor (R-SD). From 1987 to 1990 and from 1990 to 1995, he was affiliated with the offices of Congresswoman Virginia Smith (R-NE) and Congressman Pat Roberts (R-KS) and with the Committees on Appropriations and House Administration, respectively. In 1995, he joined the Office of the Clerk and served in various capacities. He was also the Acting Chief Administrative Officer of the House of Representatives from 1996 to 1997.

On November 18, 2005, Trandahl resigned as Clerk to accept a position as the executive director of the National Fish and Wildlife Foundation. He was succeeded by Karen L. Haas.

Trandahl was a board member of Human Rights Campaign. HRC is a national LGBT rights group.

=== Mark Foley scandal ===
Trandahl was the Clerk of the House during the time in which allegations against then-Representative Mark Foley by former House pages are said to have occurred. Trandahl confronted Foley at that time since it is the Clerk of the House's responsibility to effectively administer the House page system. He took great care to assure the safety of the pages. Later, he testified before the House Ethics Committee that he had warned the Speaker's office several times of his concerns about Congressman Foley's behavior toward them.

== Miscellaneous ==
In 2015, Trandahl signed an amicus brief to the Supreme Court of the United States in favor of nationally legalizing same-sex marriage.

Government offices
Preceded by Scot Faulkner	Chief Administrative Officer of the United States House of Representatives; Acting; 1996–1997	Succeeded by James M. Eagen, III
Preceded by Robin H. Carle	33rd Clerk of the United States House of Representatives; 1999–2005	Succeeded by Karen L. Haas
