= Daniel P. Beard =

American politician (born 1943)

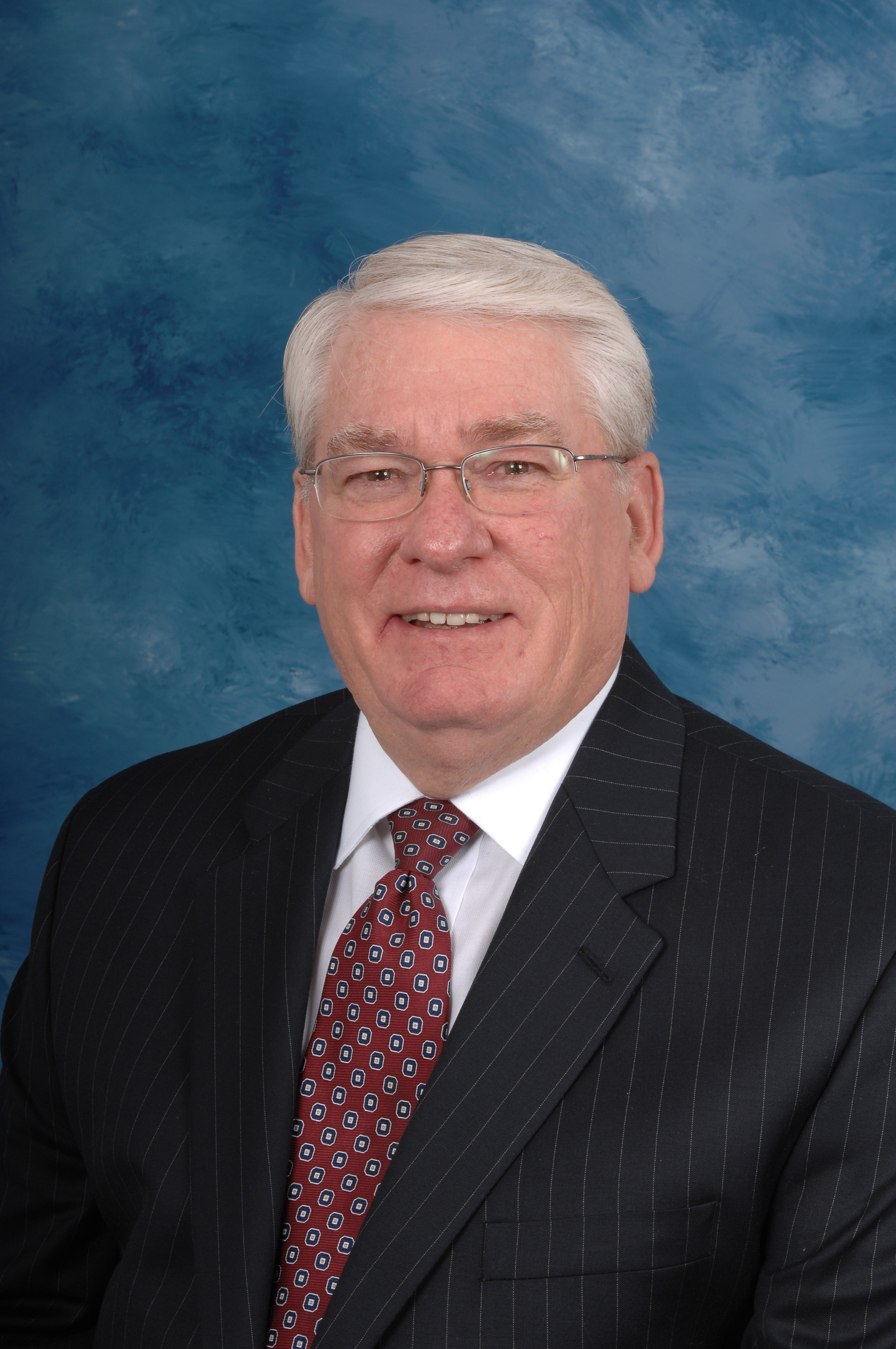
- Beard photographed during State of the Union Address c. 2007
- Born: 1943 (age 82–83); Bellingham, Washington
- Education: Western Washington University; University of Washington
- Occupation: Author
- Spouse: Dana Beard
- Children: 3

Daniel P. Beard served as the Commissioner of the United States Bureau of Reclamation, and as the fourth Chief Administrative Officer of the United States House of Representatives.

Beard is the author of Deadbeat Dams: Why We Should Abolish the U.S. Bureau of Reclamation and Tear Down Glen Canyon Dam which outlines how tax dollars are being used and misused and why we are ignoring some immediate critical water problems. Deadbeat Dams advocates a unique set of policy reforms which Beard claims could save taxpayers billions of dollars and end the waste of water in a time of critical water shortages.

== Career ==
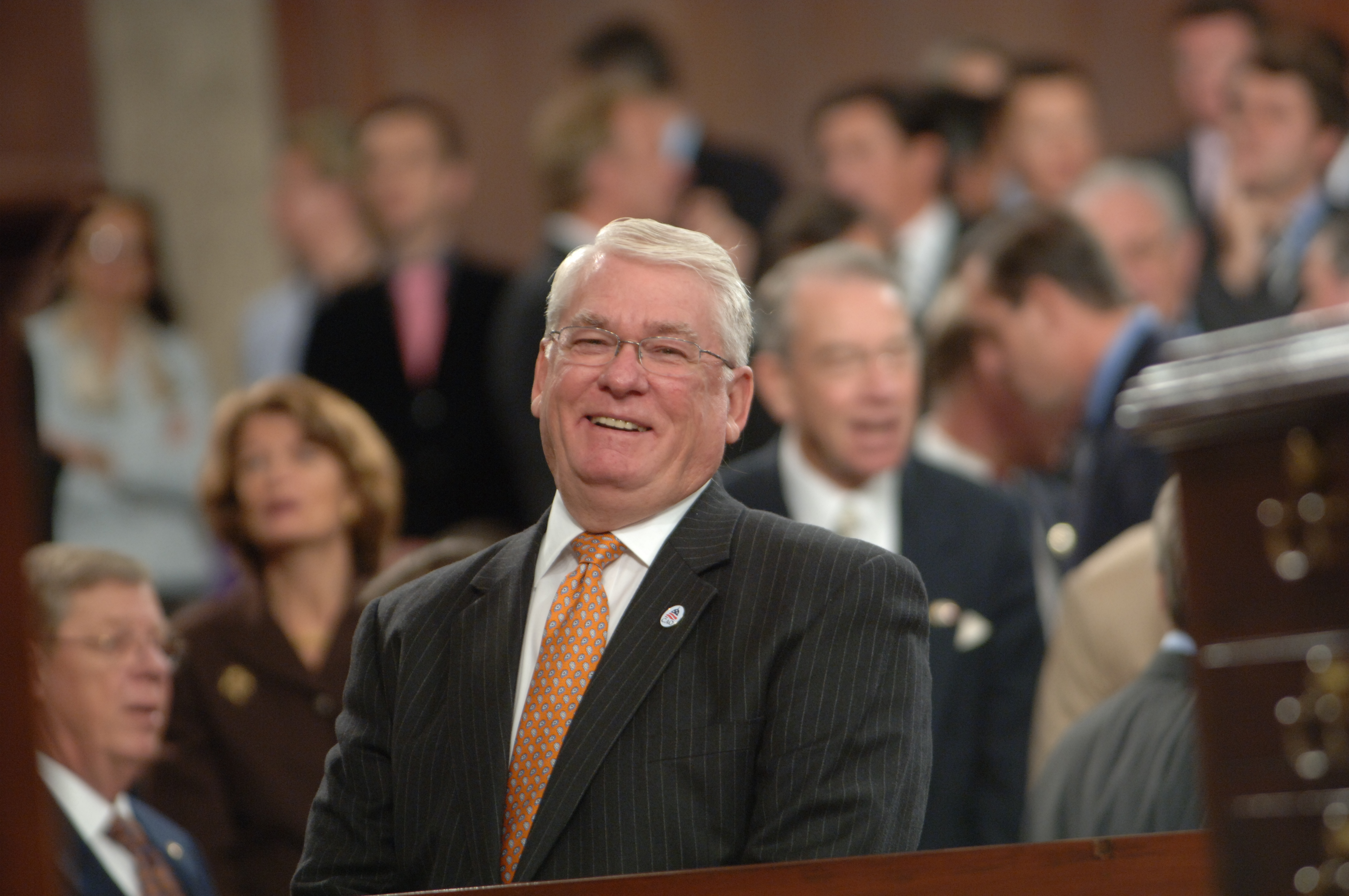
Beard photographed in 2008

Beard began his career with the Library of Congress in 1970 where he worked for the Congressional Research Service, and he served as an assistant director on President Jimmy Carter’s Domestic Policy Staff now known as the Domestic Policy Council in the White House (1977).

He also served as a Deputy Assistant Secretary in the United States Department of the Interior during the Carter Administration and served as Chief of Staff for Montana Senator Max Baucus (1982–1984).

From 1985 to 1993, he worked for the United States House Committee on Natural Resources where he was the Staff Director for the Water and Power Subcommittee before becoming Staff Director of the full committee in 1991.

Beard was appointed to the position of Commissioner, United States Bureau of Reclamation by President Bill Clinton in 1993. He served in that position until September 1995.

He was elected to the position of Chief Administrative Officer of the United States House of Representatives in February 2007 and remained in that position until resigning in July 2010. While in that position, he assisted in development and implementation of the Green the Capitol Program, an initiative to make the United States Capitol a more environmentally sustainable workplace, the mission to make the millions of square feet of Capitol infrastructure a model of sustainability.

Beard served on the board of trustees of the American Forest Foundation from 2011 to 2017.

Recently Beard has called upon the new Trump administration to eliminate The Bureau of Reclamation.

== Education ==
A native of Bellingham, Washington, Dr. Beard earned a B.A. from Western Washington University and both his M.A. and Ph.D. from the University of Washington.

He and his wife of over fifty years have three adult children, as well as two grandchildren. They have resided in Columbia, Maryland since 1974.

Cultural offices
Preceded by James M. Eagen, III	Chief Administrative Officer of the United States House of Representatives; 2007–2010	Succeeded by Daniel J. Strodel
Preceded by Dennis B. Underwood	Commissioner of the United States Bureau of Reclamation; 1993–1995	Succeeded by Eluid L. Martinez
