= Robin H. Carle =

Robin Carle
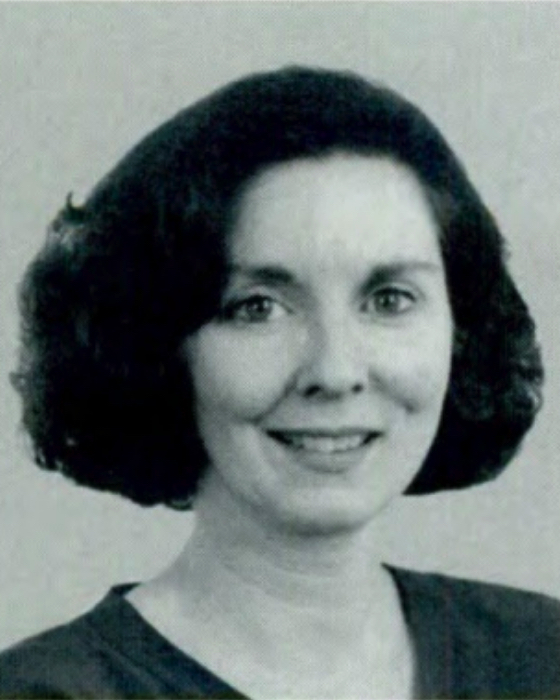
- Carle in 1997

32nd Clerk of the United States House of Representatives
- In office January 4, 1995 – December 21, 1998
- Speaker: Newt Gingrich
- Preceded by: Donnald K. Anderson
- Succeeded by: Jeff Trandahl

Personal details
- Born: June 1, 1955 (age 71) Albuquerque, New Mexico
- Party: Republican
- Education: Macalester College (BA)

Robin Hewlett Carle (born June 1, 1955) served as the thirty-second Clerk of the U.S. House of Representatives. Carle was the first woman to hold the position.

== Biography ==
Carle is a native of New Mexico. She attended Macalester College in Saint Paul, Minnesota.

She was executive Secretary then Chief of Staff for the Department of Health and Human Services under George H. W. Bush. She was Clerk of the U.S. House of Representatives from 1995 to 1999.

Carle joined The Century Council after leaving the U.S. House of Representatives. She became senior vice president at Fleishman-Hillard in 2004. She joined Dr. Louis W. Sullivan at the Joint Center for Political and Economic Studies in 2007. Carle was the executive director and Chief Operating Officer at The Sullivan Alliance to Transform the Health Professions from 2007 to 2018.Carle now serves as the Senior Director of the Visiting Student Learning Opportunities (VSLO) program at the Association of American Medical Colleges (AAMC).

Government offices
Preceded by Donnald K. Anderson	32nd Clerk of the United States House of Representatives; 1995 – 1998	Succeeded by Jeff Trandahl
