= Chief Administrative Officer of the United States House of Representatives =

Chief Administrative Officer of U.S. House of Representatives
- Seal of the United States House of Representatives

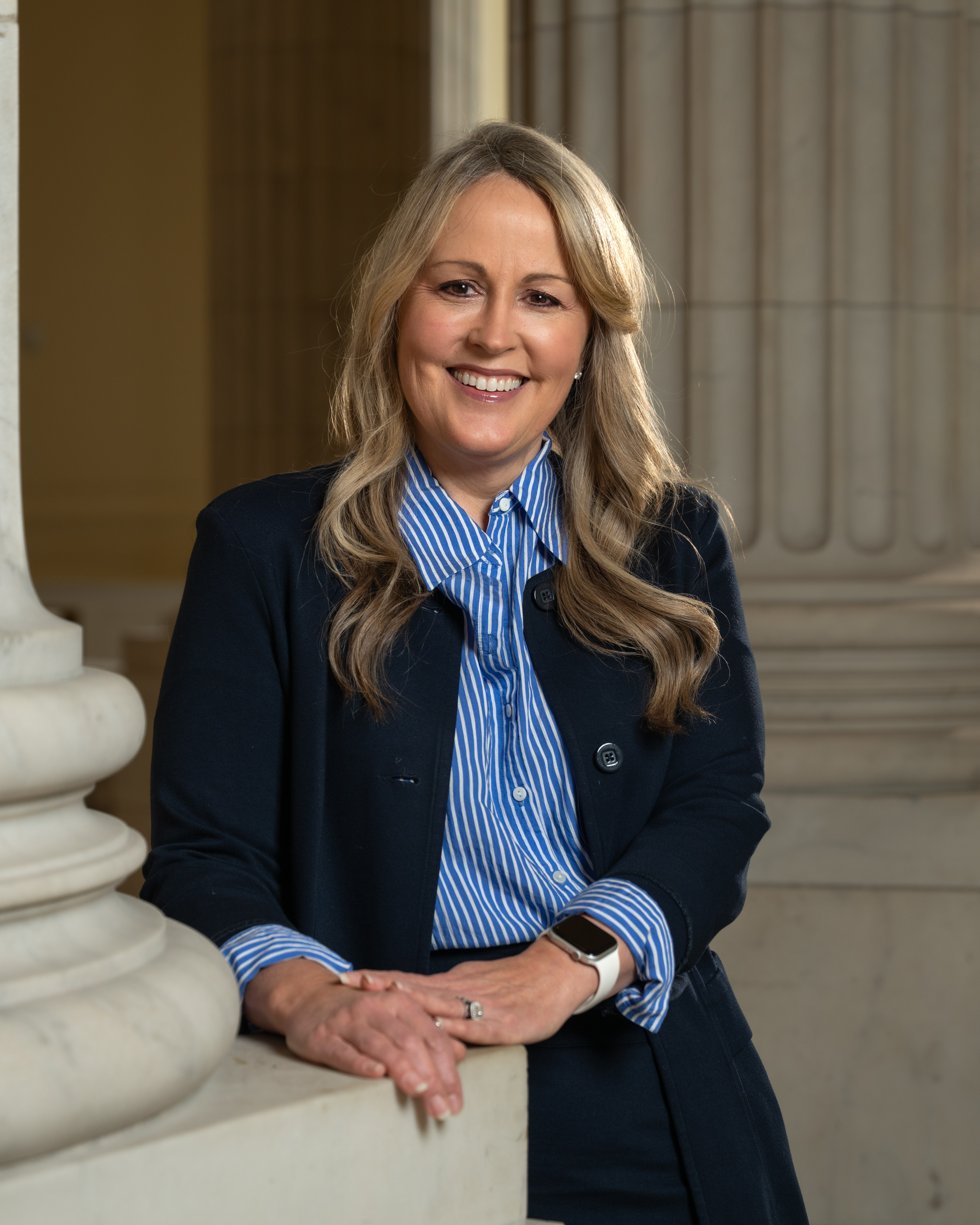
- Incumbent; Anne M. Dressendorfer Binsted since December 31, 2025
- Abbreviation: CAO
- Seat: Washington, D.C.
- Nominator: Speaker of the House
- Appointer: The House with a majority vote
- Term length: Elected at the beginning of the new Congress, and upon a vacancy during a Congress.
- Constituting instrument: H. Res. 6 (104th Congress, 1st Session)
- Precursor: Director of Non-Legislative and Financial Services
- Formation: January 4, 1995
- First holder: Scot M. Faulkner
- Website: cao.house.gov

The chief administrative officer of the United States House of Representatives (CAO) is charged with carrying out administrative functions for the House, including human resources, information resources, payroll, finance, procurement, and other business services.

Along with the other House officers, the chief administrative officer is elected every two years when the House organizes for a new Congress. The majority and minority party conferences (the Democratic Caucus of the United States House of Representatives and Republican Conference of the United States House of Representatives) nominate candidates for the House officer positions after the election of the speaker of the House. The full House adopts a resolution to elect the officers, who will begin serving the membership after they have taken the oath of office.

The office of the chief administrative officer was first created during the 104th Congress, which met from January 3, 1995, to January 3, 1997. It replaced the position of the doorkeeper of the United States House of Representatives, which was abolished at the same time. Scot Faulkner of West Virginia served as the first CAO. During his tenure he led the reform of the scandal-plagued House financial system, abolished the Folding Room, and privatized postal operations, printing, and shoe repair. Mr. Faulkner's office also implemented the first House Intranet (CyberCongress) and expanded digital camera coverage of the House Chamber and committee rooms. Faulkner's reform efforts are chronicled in the books Naked Emperors (Rowman & Littlefield Publishers, Inc., February 2008; ISBN 0-7425-5881-9) and Inside Congress (Pocket Books, August 1998; ISBN 0-671-00386-0].

Anne M. Dressendorfer Binsted, serves as acting chief administrative officer of the U.S. House of Representatives, effective December 31, 2025.

== List of chief administrative officers ==
This table represents those who have served as chief administrative officer of the United States House of Representatives. The table lists the CAO who began each Congress; term of service may end before the sitting Congress if they resigned early.

United States Congress	Chief Administrative Officer	Term of service
104th	Scot M. Faulkner	January 4, 1995 – November 22, 1996
104th	Jeff Trandahl	November 22, 1996 – July 31, 1997
105th	Jeff Trandahl	November 22, 1996 – July 31, 1997
105th	James M. Eagen, III	July 31, 1997 – February 15, 2007
106th	James M. Eagen, III	July 31, 1997 – February 15, 2007
107th	James M. Eagen, III	July 31, 1997 – February 15, 2007
108th	James M. Eagen, III	July 31, 1997 – February 15, 2007
109th	James M. Eagen, III	July 31, 1997 – February 15, 2007
110th	James M. Eagen, III	July 31, 1997 – February 15, 2007
110th	Daniel P. Beard	February 15, 2007 – July 18, 2010
111th	Daniel P. Beard	February 15, 2007 – July 18, 2010
111th	Daniel J. Strodel	July 18, 2010 – January 7, 2014
112th	Daniel J. Strodel	July 18, 2010 – January 7, 2014
113th	Daniel J. Strodel	July 18, 2010 – January 7, 2014
113th	Ed Cassidy	January 7, 2014 – January 1, 2016
114th	Ed Cassidy	January 7, 2014 – January 1, 2016
114th	Will Plaster	January 1, 2016 – August 1, 2016
114th	Philip G. Kiko	August 1, 2016 – January 3, 2021
115th	Philip G. Kiko	August 1, 2016 – January 3, 2021
116th	Philip G. Kiko	August 1, 2016 – January 3, 2021
117th	Catherine L. Szpindor	January 3, 2021 – December 31, 2025
118th	Catherine L. Szpindor	January 3, 2021 – December 31, 2025
119th	Catherine L. Szpindor	January 3, 2021 – December 31, 2025
119th	Anne M. Dressendorfer Binsted	December 31, 2025 – present
