= Barry (surname) =

Barry is a surname, and may refer to:

== A ==
- Aaron Barry (born 1992), Irish soccer player
- Abdourahmane Barry (born 2000), French footballer
- Abubakr Barry (born 2000), Gambian footballer
- Adam Barry (born 1981), English musician
- Aideen Barry (born 1979), Irish visual artist
- Al Barry (1930–2022), American football player
- Alda Milner-Barry (1893–1938), British cryptanalyst and academic
- Alexander G. Barry (1892–1952), American attorney and politician from Oregon
- Alfred Barry (1826–1910), Anglican Bishop of Sydney; son of Charles Barry
- A. Constantine Barry (Alfred Constantine Barry) (1815–1888), American educator and politician
- Alice Barry (born 1946), English actress
- Alice Mary Barry (1880–1955), Irish doctor
- Allan Barry (born 1930), American football player
- Alpha Barry (born 1970), Burkinabé politician and journalist
- Alpha Oumar Barry (1925–1977), Guinean politician
- Alvin L. Barry (1931–2001), American Lutheran cleric
- Angela Barry, Bermudian writer and educator
- Ann Street Barry (1734–1801), English actress; second wife of Spranger Barry
- Anne Meredith Barry (1932–2003), Canadian visual artist
- Anthony Barry (1901–1983), Irish businessman and politician
- Anthony Barry (footballer) (born 1986), English football player and coach
- Arthur John Barry (1859–1943), English civil engineer and architect, son of Charles Barry, Jr.
- Arthur Smith-Barry, 1st Baron Barrymore (1843–1925), Anglo-Irish politician
- Ashlin Barry (born 2007), Canadian-American racing cyclist
- Augustus Barry (c.1840–1871), American soldier, recipieny of the Medal of Honor during the American Civil War
- Aurore Barry, American screenwriter and video director

== B ==
- B. Constance Barry, American actor
- B. H. Barry, English fight director and choreographer
- Ben Barry (born 1983), Canadian entrepreneur and academic
- Bibata Niandou Barry (born 1955), Niger lawyer and politician
- Bill Barry (1899–1955), Australian rules footballer
- Bill Barry (politician) (1899–1972), Australian politician
- Billie Barry (1921–2014), Irish singer, dancer and stage school founder
- Bob Barry Sr. (1931–2011), American television and radio sportscaster
- Bob Barry Jr. (1956–2015), American sportscaster
- Bob Barry (cricketer, born 1868) (1868–1938), New Zealand cricketer and umpire
- Bob Barry (cricketer, born 1878) (1878–1915), New Zealand soldier and cricketer
- Bob Barry (photographer) (born 1943), American actor and photographer
- Bonny Barry (born 1960), Australian politician
- Boubacar Barry (born 1979), Ivorian footballer
- Boubacar Barry (footballer, born 1996), Guinean footballer
- Boubacar Barry (historian) (born 1943), Senegalese historian
- Bradley Barry (born 1995), English footballer
- Brent Barry (born 1971), American basketball player and sports commentator; third son of Rick Barry
- Brian Barry (1936–2009), British philosopher
- Bridgette Barry (1957–2021), American biophysicist and biochemist
- Bruce Barry (actor) (1934–2017), Australian actor and singer
- Bruce S. Barry, American television soap opera director
- Brunonia Barry (born 1950), American novelist
- Bryan T. Barry (1851–1919), American attorney and mayor of Dallas
- Buck Barry (1917–1997) was an American actor and radio and television personality

== C ==
- Campbell Barry (born 1991), New Zealand politician
- Canyon Barry (born 1994), American basketball player; son of Rick Barry
- Carlos Walter Galán Barry (1925–2003), Argentine Catholic bishop
- Caroline Barry, American actress
- Carolyne Barry (1943–2015), American dancer and dance instructor
- Catherine Barry (born 2001), American soccer player
- Cathy Barry, English glamour model and pornographic actress
- Ceal Barry (born 1955), American basketball player and coach
- Chantelle Barry (born 1980), Australian musician and actress
- Charles Barry (1795–1860), English architect
- Charles Barry Jr. (1823–1900), English architect; son of Charles Barry
- Charles Barry (judge) (1877–1956), South African judge
- Charles David Barry (1859–1928), Irish barrister, cricketer and tennis
- Charles Robert Barry (1823–1897), Irish lawyer and politician
- Cheri Barry (1955–2023), American politician from Mississippi
- Cherno Omar Barry, Gambian academic and writer
- Chiaka Barry, Australian politician
- Christian Barry, American philosopher
- Christiane Barry (1918–1992), French stage and film actress
- Christopher Barry (1925–2014), British television director
- Ciarán Barry (born 1999), Irish hurler
- Claud Barry (1891–1951), Royal Navy officer
- Claude Francis Barry (1884–1970), British etcher and painter, and baronet
- Claudja Barry (born 1952), Jamaican-Canadian singer and actress
- Clifford Barry (1946–2021), Canadian water polo player
- Clive Barry (1922–2003), Australian author, playwright and cartoonist
- Colin Barry (born 1974), Zambian military officer
- Colleen Barry, American mental health and addiction researcher
- Colm Barry (born 1993), Irish hurler
- Connor Barry (born 2003), American college football player
- Craig Barry (born 1992), South African rugby union footballer

== D ==
- Damion Barry (born 1982), Trinidadian sprinter
- Dan Barry (cartoonist) (1923–1997), American comic strip artist
- Dan Barry (reporter) (born 1958), American journalist and author
- Dan Barry (umpire) (1886–1947), American baseball umpire
- Daniel T. Barry (born 1953), American astronaut
- Danni Barry, Northern Irish chef
- Darren Barry (born 1990), English rugby union footballer
- Dave Barry (born 1947), American author and columnist
- Dave Barry (actor) (1918–2001), American actor and comedian
- Dave Barry (Australian footballer) (1888–1913), Australian rules footballer
- Dave Barry (Irish footballer) (born 1961), Irish dual code footballer
- David Barry (actor) (born 1943), Welsh actor
- David Barry (New Zealand paediatrician) (born 1939), New Zealand paediatrician
- David Barry (Irish physician) (1780–1835), Irish physician and physiologist
- David Francis Barry (1854–1934), photographer of the American West
- David S. Barry (1859–1936), American journalist and official
- David Barry, 1st Earl of Barrymore (1604–1642)
- Dede Barry (born 1972), American cycle racer
- Demba Barry (born 1987), Malian footballer
- Denis Barry (1929–2003), president of the United States Chess Federation (1993–96)
- Denny Barry (1883–1923), Irish Republican, died during the 1923 Irish hunger strikes
- Derrick Barry (born 1983), American drag performer
- Desmond Barry (born 1954), Welsh author
- Des Barry (footballer) (1933–2015), Australian rules footballer
- Desmond Barry (born 1954), Welsh author
- De Wet Barry (born 1978), South African rugby union footballer
- Diana Barry (born 1986), Scottish footballer
- Diawadou Barry (1916–c.1969), Guinean politician
- Dick Barry (1926–2013), American politician and lawyer
- Djene Barry (born 1982), Guinean swimmer
- Dom Barry (born 1994), Australian rules footballer
- Don "Red" Barry (1912–1980), American film actor
- Don Barry (Canadian football) (1931–2014), Canadian football player
- Donald T. Barry (1928–2017), American politician
- Donna Barry (born 1947), American politician from Iowa
- Drew Barry (born 1973), American basketball player; son of Rick Barry

== E ==
- Eamonn Barry, Irish Gaelic footballer and manager
- Ed Barry (baseball) (1882–1920), American baseball pitcher
- Eddie Barry (actor) (1887–1966), American actor
- Eddie Barry (ice hockey) (1919–2016), American ice hockey player
- Edith Barry (1884–1969), American sculptor and painter
- Edward Barry (cricketer) (1898–1965), Irish cricketer
- Edward Barry (Irish nationalist politician) (1852–1927), Irish Member of Parliament
- Edward Barry (writer) (1759–1822), English writer
- Edward Middleton Barry (1830–1880), English architect; son of Charles Barry
- Edward B. Barry (1849–1939), American rear admiral
- Edward P. Barry (1864–1936), American politician from Massachusetts
- Sir Edward Barry, 1st Baronet (1696–1776), Irish physician and politician
- Edwina Barry (1886–1988), American vaudeville performer and comedian
- Elizabeth Barry (1658–1713), English actress
- Ellen Barry (attorney) (born 1953), American public interest lawyer
- Ellen Barry (journalist) (born 1971), American reporter
- Ellen Barry (tennis) (born 1989), New Zealand tennis player
- Ellen Semple Barry (1899–1995), American portrait artist, wife of playwright Philip Barry
- Eloïne Barry (born 1981), French journalist
- Ernest Barry (footballer) (born 1967), Maltese footballer
- Ernest Barry (rower) (1882–1968), British rower
- Ernie Barry (1928−2003), New Zealand educator and politician
- Eric Barry (1927–2015), Canadian Army militia officer

== F ==
- Fan Barry, Irish hurler
- Fatoumata Barry (born 1954), Guinean architect and writer
- Felix Barry (1858–1933), English amateur footballer
- Florence Barry (1885–1965), British suffragist
- Sir Francis Barry, 1st Baronet (1825–1907), English businessman
- François Pierre Barry (1813–1905), French painter
- Frank Barry (footballer) (1892–1963), Australian rules footballer
- Fred Barry (1948–2016), American football player
- Frederick G. Barry (1845–1909), American lawyer and politician
- Frederick L. Barry (1897–1960), American Episcopal bishop

== G ==
- Gareth Barry (born 1981), English footballer
- Garret Barry (piper) (1847–1899), Irish blind piper
- Garret Barry (soldier) (died 1647), Irish soldier and writer
- Garrett Standish Barry (1788–1864), Irish politician
- Gene Barry (1919–2009), American stage, screen and television actor
- George Barry (author) (1748–1805), Scottish minister and historian of the Orkney Islands
- George Richard Barry (1825–1867), Irish politician
- Gerald Barry (actor), British stage and film actor
- Gerald Barry (British Army officer) (1896–1977), British soldier and cricketer
- Gerald Barry (British journalist) (1898–1968), British newspaper editor
- Gerald Barry (composer) (born 1952), Irish composer
- Gerald Barry (Irish journalist) (1947–2011), Irish political journalist and broadcaster
- George Richard Barry (1825–1867), Member of the UK Parliament
- Gerat Barry or Gerald Barry (fl.1624–1642), colonel in the Spanish army and military writer
- Ghishma Barry (died 2017), South African politician
- GK Barry (born 1999), stage name of Grace Keeling, English influencer and presenter
- Glenn Barry, American musician, bass player in the symphonic metal band Kamelot
- Gordon Barry (1885–1942), English soldier and amateur golfer
- Grant Barry, American musician

== H ==
- Hadji Barry (born 1992), Guinean footballer
- Hamza Barry (born 1994), Gambian footballer
- Hardin Barry (1891–1969), American baseball pitcher
- Harold L. Barry, American polo player
- Harry Barry, Irish general practitioner and author
- Helen Barry (1840–1904), English actress
- Henry Barry (British Army officer) (1750–1822), British Army officer
- Henry Deacon Barry (1849–1908), British Royal Navy officer
- Henry W. Barry (1840–1875), Union Army officer of the American Civil War
- Henry Barry, 3rd Baron Barry of Santry (1680–1734), Anglo-Irish soldier and official
- Henry Barry, 4th Baron Barry of Santry (1710–1751), Irish peer and rake
- Hilary Barry (born 1969), New Zealand journalist and television personality
- Hugh Otter-Barry (1887–1971), Anglican Bishop of Mauritius

== I ==
- Ian Barry (director) (born 1946), Australian television and film director
- Ibra Barry (born 2002), Spanish footballer
- Ibrahima Sory Barry (died 1975), Guinean chief and politician
- Iris Barry (1895–1969), British-American film critic and curator
- Ivor Barry (1919–2006), Welsh film and television actor

== J ==
- J. Edward Barry (1874–1932), mayor of Cambridge, Massachusetts
- Jack Barry (baseball) (1887–1961), American baseball player and manager
- Jack Barry (Gaelic footballer) (born 1994), Irish county player for Kerry
- Jack Barry (game show host) (1918–1984), American television host and producer
- Jack Barry (unionist) (1924–2005), American labor union leader
- Jacko Barry (born 1975) is an Irish darts player
- James Barry (hurler) (born 1990), Irish hurler
- James Barry (Irish MP, 1659–1717), Irish politician
- James Barry (Irish MP, 1689–1743), Irish politician
- James Barry (Kildare MP), Irish politician
- James Barry (painter) (1741–1806), Irish painter
- James Barry (surgeon) (c.1789–1865), Irish physician in the British Army
- James Barry (Wisconsin politician) (1812–1883), Irish-born Wisconsin state assemblyman
- James Alexander Barry (1886–1950), Canadian politician
- James E. Barry (1884–1941), American college football coach
- James G. Barry (1800–1880), Missouri politician, mayor of St. Louis
- James J. Barry Jr. (born 1946), New Jersey politician
- James L. Barry, comics artist
- James Barry, 4th Earl of Barrymore (1667–1748), Irish soldier and Jacobite politician
- James Barry, 1st Baron Barry of Santry (1603–1673), Irish lawyer
- Jan Barry (born 1943), American poet, journalist, author and activist
- Jane Barry (born 1944), Canadian chemist and politician
- Jane F. Barry (born 1966), American women's rights author
- Jason Barry (born 1972), Irish actor
- Jason Barry-Smith (born 1969), Australian operatic baritone, vocal coach, composer and arranger
- Jeff Barry (born 1938), American pop music songwriter, singer and record producer
- Jeff Barry (baseball) (born 1969), American baseball player
- Jeffrey Barry (politician), American politician from Texas
- Jennifer Barry, American classical scholar
- Jessica Barry (born 1994), English professional boxer
- Jill Barry (born 1973), American politician from Connecticut
- Jim Barry (1893–1968), Irish hurling and Gaelic football trainer
- Jim Barry (general) (born 1932), Australian general, businessman and sports administrator
- Jimmy Barry (1870–1943), Irish-American boxer
- Joan Barry (British actress) (1903–1989), starred in The Card
- Joan Barry (American actress) (1920–2007), sued Charlie Chaplin over paternity
- Joan Barry (politician) (born 1941), American politician
- Joe Barry (born 1970), American football coach
- Joe Barry (director-general) (1932–2022), Irish television executive
- Joe Barry (polo), American polo player
- Joe Barry (rugby union) (1876–1961), South African rugby union footballer
- Joe Barry (singer) (1939–2004), American singer
- John Barry (bishop of Savannah) (1799–1859), American Catholic bishop
- John Barry (composer) (1933–2011), English film music composer
- John Barry (Dean of Elphin) (1728–1794), Irish Anglican dean
- John Barry (Green Party politician) (born 1966), Irish economist and politician
- John Barry (MP) (1845–1921), Irish Member of Parliament
- John Barry (naval officer) (1745–1803), American naval officer
- John Barry (production designer) (1935–1979), British film designer
- John Barry (tennis) (born 1928), New Zealand tennis player
- John Barry (VC) (1873–1901), Irish recipient of the Victoria Cross
- John Barry (WD-40) (1924–2009), American business executive
- John Alexander Barry (c.1790–1872), Canadian merchant and politician in Nova Scotia
- John Arthur Barry (1850–1911), Australian journalist
- John Burke Barry (1880–1937), American equestrian
- John Joe Barry (1925–1994), Irish middle-distance runner
- John Milner Barry (1768–1822), Irish doctor
- John Patrick Barry (1893–1946), Canadian politician and lawyer
- John Vincent Barry (1903–1969), Australia judge
- John Wolfe Barry (1836–1918), English civil engineer and architect, son of Charles Barry
- John D. Barry (1839–1867), brigadier general in the Confederate States Army
- John J. Barry (1924–2005), American labor union leader
- John M. Barry (born 1947), American author and historian
- John S. Barry (1802–1870), American lawyer and politician from Michigan
- James Barry, 1st Baron Barry of Santry (1603–1673), Irish lawyer, judge and peer
- John Maxwell-Barry, 5th Baron Farnham (1767–1838), Irish representative peer and politician
- Jon Barry (born 1969), American basketball player and television analyst; son of Rick Barry
- Jonathan Barry (born 1988), Bahamian cricketer
- Jonathan B. Barry (born 1945), American politician, businessman and farmer
- Joseph Barry (born 1940), American real estate developer
- J. Esmonde Barry (Joseph Esmonde Barry) (1923–2007), Canadian healthcare activist and political commentator
- Josh Barry (born 1992), Canadian curler
- Joyce Barry (1919–1999), Australian cyclist
- Judith Barry (born 1954), American multimedia artist and writer
- Julian Barry (1930–2023), American screenwriter and playwright

== K ==
- Kaba Rougui Barry (1953–2016), Guinean politician and entrepreneur
- Kate Barry (1752–1823), heroine of the American Revolutionary War
- Kate Barry (photographer) (1967–2013), British fashion photographer
- Katty Barry (1909–1982), Irish restaurateur
- Kathleen Barry (born 1941), American sociologist and feminist
- Keane Barry (born 2002), Irish darts player
- Keith Barry (born 1976), Irish illusionist, mentalist and close-up magician
- Ken Barry (born 1970), American stock car racing driver
- Kesso Barry (born 1948), Guinean writer
- Kevin Barry (1902–1920), Irish Republican Army member
- Kevin Barry Sr. (1936–2011), New Zealand boxing coach
- Kevin Barry (American football) (born 1979), American football player
- Kevin Barry (baseball) (born 1978), American baseball pitcher
- Kevin Barry (boxer) (born 1959), New Zealand boxer, trainer and manager
- Kevin Barry (equestrian) (1920–2002), Irish equestrian
- Kevin Barry (footballer) (born 1961), English football goalkeeper
- Kevin Barry (playwright) (born 1951), American playwright
- Kevin Barry (rugby league) (1950–2012), New Zealand rugby league footballer
- Kevin Barry (rugby union) (1936–2014), New Zealand rugby union footballer
- Kevin Barry (writer) (born 1969), Irish writer
- Kieron Barry, British playwright
- Koumbou Boly Barry, Burkinabe politician
- Kristen Barry (born 1970), American rock musician
- Kristin Barry (born 1973), American distance runner and coach
- Krystal Barry, American beauty queen
- Kyra Tirana Barry (born 1966), Team Leader for the United States Women's National wrestling team

== L ==
- Lawrence Barry, Canadian actor
- Len Barry (1942–2020), American singer, songwriter and record producer
- Leo Barry (born 1977), Australian rules footballer
- Leo Barry (jurist) (1943–2026), Canadian jurist and politician
- Leonard Barry (1901–1970), English footballer
- Leonora Barry (1849–1923), Irish-American labor activist
- Liam Barry (born 1971), New Zealand rugby union footballer and coach
- Loraine Barry (born 1964), Irish dancer
- Lording Barry (bapt. 1580–1629), English dramatist and pirate
- Louie Barry (born 2003), English footballer
- Luís Barry (born 1982), Portuguese football player
- Lyall Barry (1926–2003), New Zealand swimmer, educator and historian
- Lynda Barry (born 1956), American cartoonist and author
- Lynn Norenberg Barry (born 1959), American basketball player, coach and administrator; wife of Rick Barry

== M ==
- Mackenzie Barry (born 2001), New Zealand football player
- Maggie Barry (born 1959), New Zealand radio and television presenter and politician
- Mamadou Barry (born 1986), Guinean footballer
- Mamadou Thierno Barry (born 2005), Senegalese footballer
- Margaret Barry (1917–1989), Irish traveller, traditional singer and banjo player
- Margaret Stuart Barry (1927–2022), English writer
- Mariama Barry, Senegalese novelist and lawyer
- Mariama Dalanda Barry (born 1991), Guinean taekwondo practitioner
- Marian Barry (1871–1921), Irish trade unionist
- Marion Barry (1936–2014), American politician
- Marion Christopher Barry (1980–2016), American construction company owner, son of Marion Barry
- Mark Barry (cyclist) (born 1964), British cyclist
- Martin Barry (1802–1855), British physician and embryologist
- Marty Barry (1905–1969), Canadian ice hockey player
- Mary Barry (singer) (born 1955), Canadian musician
- Mary Gonzaga Barry (1834–1915), Irish Catholic religious sister
- Mary F. Barry (1859–1919), American doctor and politician
- Maryanne Trump Barry (1937–2013), American attorney and judge
- Maurice Barry (1885/6–1940), Australian politician in Queensland
- Max Barry (born 1973), Australian author
- Megan Barry (born 1963), American businesswoman and politician
- Michael Barry (actor), Canadian actor
- Michael Barry (cricketer) (born 1991), New Zealand cricketer
- Michael Barry (cyclist) (born 1975), Canadian racing cyclist
- Michael Barry (murderer) (1843–1890), Australian convicted murderer
- Michael Barry (television producer) (1910–1988), British television producer and executive
- Michael Barry (wrestler) (born 1954), Canadian Olympic wrestler
- Michael Barry, pseudonym of Michael Bukht (1941–2011), British radio executive and TV personality
- Michael Joseph Barry (1817–1889), Irish poet and political figure
- Michael Maltman Barry (1842–1909), Scottish political activist
- Michael A. Barry (born 1948), American historian
- Michele Barry, American physician and academic
- Mick Barry (bowler) (1919–2014), Irish road bowler
- Mick Barry (Irish politician) (born 1964), Irish politician
- Mick Barry (rugby union) (1943–2020), Australian rugby union footballer
- Mike Barry (American football) (born 1946), American football coach
- Mike Barry (footballer) (born 1953), English footballer
- Monique Barry (born 2002), New Zealand tennis player
- Morris Barry (1918–2000), English television producer
- Moyra Barry (1886–1960), Irish artist
- Myra Barry (born 1957), Irish politician

== N ==
- Nancy Barry, American banker
- Neale Barry (born 1958), English football referee
- Ned Barry (1905–1993), New Zealand rugby union footballer
- Neil Barry (born 1966), Guyanese cricketer
- Neill Barry (born 1965), American actor
- Nicky Barry (born 1969), Irish rugby union footballer
- Norman Barry (1897–1988), American judge, politician and football coach
- Norman P. Barry (1944–2008), English philosopher

== O ==
- Odell Barry (1941–2022), American football player
- Orla Barry (born 1989), Irish discus thrower
- Orla Barry (artist), Irish artist
- Ousmane Barry (born 1991), Guinean footballer

== P ==
- Paddy Barry (Limerick hurler) (1895–1967), Irish hurler
- Paddy Barry (Sarsfields hurler) (1928–2000), Irish hurler
- Paddy Barry (St Vincent's hurler) (born 1941), Irish hurler
- Paddy Barry (footballer) (fl.1928), Irish soccer player
- Pat Barry (hurler) (born 1951), Irish hurler and Gaelic footballer
- Pat Barry (fighter) (born 1979), American mixed martial artist and kickboxer
- Patricia Barry (1922–2016), American actress
- Patrick Berry (born 1970), American puzzle creator
- Patrick Barry (horticulturist) (1816–1890), American horticulturist and author
- Patrick Barry (bishop) (1868–1940), American Catholic bishop
- Patrick Barry (judge) (1898–1972), British judge
- Paul Barry (born 1952), Australian journalist and television presenter
- Paul Barry (American football) (1926–2014), American football player
- Paul Barry (songwriter) (born 1962), British musician
- Paul W. Barry (active 1948–1957), American polo player
- Paul Barry-Walsh (born 1955), British businessman
- Peter Barry (equestrian) (born 1956), Canadian equestrian
- Peter Barry (footballer) (1937–2005), VFL footballer for Carlton
- Peter Barry (hurler) (born 1974), Irish hurler
- Peter Barry (poet) (born 1947), British writer and academic
- Peter Barry (politician) (1928–2016), Irish politician and businessman
- Peter H. Barry, American geochemist
- Philip Barry (1896–1949), American dramatist
- Phillips Barry (1880–1937), American academic and collector of traditional ballads
- Phyllis Barry (1908–1954), English film actress

== Q ==
- Quan Barry, Vietnamese-American poet, novelist and playwright

== R ==
- Rahmane Barry (born 1986), Senegalese footballer
- Ralph Andrews Barry (1883–1939), American philatelic writer
- Ray Barry (hurler) (born 1972), Irish hurling goalkeeper
- Ray Barry (ice hockey) (William Raymond Barry) (1928–2018), Canadian ice hockey player
- Raymond Barry (born 1949), Australian wrestler
- Raymond J. Barry (born 1939), American actor
- Rebecca Barry, Australian film and television director and producer
- Redmond Barry (1813–1880), Anglo-Irish-Australian judge
- Redmond Barry (died 1750), Irish Member of Parliament
- Redmond Barry (lord chancellor) (1866–1913), Irish lawyer and judge
- Redmond Barry (sportsman), Irish Gaelic footballer and hurler
- Rémi Barry (born 1991), French basketball player
- Rhona Barry (born 1968), Irish sports shooter
- Rhoda Barry (1916–2011), South African librarian, composer and poet
- Rich Barry (1940–2021), American baseball player
- Richard Barry (Irish politician) (1919–2013), Irish politician
- Richard Hugh Barry (1908–1999), British Army officer
- Richard Barry, 2nd Earl of Barrymore (1630–1694)
- Richard Barry, 7th Earl of Barrymore (1769–1793), English nobleman of Ireland
- Richard Barry (died 1787), British Member of Parliament for Wigan
- Rick Barry (born 1944), American basketball player
- Robert Barry (artist) (born 1936), American artist
- Robert Barry (merchant) (1759–1843), Scottish-Canadian merchant in Nova Scotia
- Robert Barry (musician) (1938–2018), American jazz musician
- Robert Barry (politician) (1731–1793), Irish barrister and politician
- Robert A. Barry (1860–1934), American politician and judge from Missouri
- Robert L. Barry (1934–2024), American diplomat
- Robert R. Barry (1915–1988), American businessman and politician
- Robert Smith-Barry (1886–1949), officer in the Royal Flying Corps and Royal Air Force
- Robertine Barry (1863–1910), French Canadian journalist and publisher
- Roberto Barry (1920–1980), Uruguayan singer, actor and writer
- Rod Barry (born 1973), American pornographic actor
- Roger G. Barry (1935–2018), American geographer and climatologist
- Ron Barry, Irish jump jockey of the 20th century
- Ron Barry (footballer) (1923–1978), Australian rules footballer
- Roy Barry (born 1942), Scottish footballer
- Roy M. Barry, American polo player
- Rugie Barry, Liberian politician
- Russell Barry (1890–1976), Anglican bishop and author

== S ==
- Sam Barry (1892–1959), American sportsman and coach
- Sam Barry (author) (born 1957), American author and columnist
- Sam Barry (tennis) (born 1992), Irish tennis player
- Samuel Barry, 17th-century English colonial governor
- Samantha Barry (born 1981/2), Irish magazine editor
- Sandra Barry (born 1943), English actress, singer and record producer
- Scott Barry (born 1976), American baseball umpire
- Scooter Barry (born 1966), American basketball player; son of Rick Barry
- Seánie Barry (born 1945). Irish hurler and manager
- Sebastian Barry (born 1955), Irish writer
- Sékoumar Barry (born 1935), Guinean film director and screenwriter
- Seydou Barry (1943–2007), Senegalese painter
- Shad Barry (1878–1936), American baseball player
- Shawn Barry (born 1990), Puerto Rican footballer
- Simon Barry (born 1966), Canadian screenwriter, film producer and director, and television producer
- Son Barry (1877–1959), Australian rules footballer
- Spranger Barry (1719–1777), Irish actor
- Steeve Barry (born 1991), French rugby seven footballer
- Stephen Barry (1945–2000), British drama producer and arts administrator
- Steve Barry (race walker) (born 1950), Welsh race walker
- Steve Barry (musician), New Zealand-Australian jazz pianist and composer
- Stuart Milner-Barry (1906–1995), British codebreaker, civil servant and chess player
- Susan R. Barry, American neurobiologist
- Sy Barry (born 1928), American comic-strip artist

== T ==
- Tadhg Barry (1880–1921), leading Irish Republican, trade unionist and poet
- Taylor Barry (born 1995), New Zealand boxing trainer
- Thierno Barry (footballer, born 2000) (born 2000), Spanish footballer
- Thierno Barry (footballer, born 2002) (born 2002), French professional footballer
- Thom Barry (active 1995–2016), American actor and disk jockey
- Thomas Barry (actor) (1743–1768), Irish stage actor and theatre manager
- Thomas Barry (clown) (c. 1810–1857), Irish circus clown
- Thomas Barry (English politician) (fl. 1413), Member of Parliament
- Thomas Henry Barry (1855–1919), United States Army major general
- Thomas A. Barry (c.1879–1947), American football player and coach
- Thomas E. Barry (1899 –1977), American politician from Massachusetts
- Thomas J. Barry (1907–1987), American horse trainer
- Tim Barry, American musician
- Timothy Barry (born 1964), English cricketer
- Tobias Barry (1924–2017), American politician from Illinois
- Tobias Barry Sr. (1895–1958), American politician
- Todd Barry (born 1964), American actor and comedian
- Tom Barry (baseball) (1879–1946), American baseball pitcher
- Tom Barry (Cork hurler) (1903–1984), Irish hurler
- Tom Barry (Irish republican) (1897–1980), Irish republican leader in the IRA
- Tom Barry (London hurler) (1879–1969), Irish sportsman and revolutionary figure
- Tom Barry (politician) (born 1968), Irish politician
- Tom Barry (rugby league, born 1899) (1899–1959), Australian rugby league footballer
- Tom Barry (rugby league, born 1901) (1901–1969), Australian rugby league footballer
- Tom Barry (screenwriter) (1885–1931), American screenwriter
- Toni Barry (born 1961), British voice actress
- Tony Barry (1941–2022), Australian actor
- Trevor Barry (born 1983), Bahamian high jumper
- Tyler Barry (born 2005), American stock car racing driver

== V ==
- Vincent Barry (1908–1975), Irish scientist
- Viola Barry (1894–1964), American film actress

== W ==
- Warren E. Barry (1933–2016), American politician
- Wesley Barry (1907–1994), American film actor, director and producer
- William Barry (bishop) (1872–1929), Archbishop of Hobart, Tasmania
- William Barry (Congregationalist) (1805–1885), American Congregational pastor and author
- William Barry (footballer) (1929–2007), Irish footballer
- William Bernard Barry (1902–1946), American lawyer and politician from New York
- William Farquhar Barry (1818–1879), United States Army officer
- William fitz Robert Barry (fl.1615), Irish harper
- William Francis Barry (1849–1930), British Catholic priest, theologian and writer
- William Gerard Barry (1864–1941), Irish artist
- William Jackson Barry (1819–1907), New Zealand adventurer and writer
- William Lloyd Barry (1916–1999), member of the Governing Body of Jehovah's Witnesses and related offices
- William J. Barry (born 1943), Irish phonetician in Germany
- William L. Barry (born 1940), British rower and coach
- William R. Barry (1828–1900), American businessman and advocate for the deaf
- William S. Barry (1821–1868), American politician from Mississippi
- William T. Barry (1784–1835), American politician and jurist from Kentucky

== Y ==
- Yakhouba Gnagna Barry (born 1998), Guinean footballer
- Yank Barry (born 1948), Canadian businessman and musician

== See also ==
- Barrie (surname)
- Barri (surname)
- Bari (surname)
- Bardy (surname)
- Barré
- Barty
- Bary
- De Bary (surname)
- De Barry (surname)
- du Barry (surname)
- DuBarry (surname)
- Barry-Murphy
- Berry (surname)
- Burry
- Parry (surname)
