= William Barry =

William Barry may refer to:

== Politics ==
- Dick Barry (1926–2013), Speaker of the Tennessee House of Representatives
- William T. Barry (1784–1835), politician from Kentucky and Postmaster General under Andrew Jackson
- William S. Barry (1821–1868), American politician from Mississippi
- Bill Barry (politician) (1899–1972), member of the Victorian Legislative Assembly
- William Bernard Barry (1902–1946), politician from New York

== Religion ==
- William Francis Barry (1849–1930), British Catholic priest, theologian, educator and writer
- William Barry (bishop), DD (1872–1929), Archbishop of Hobart, Tasmania
- William Barry (Congregationalist) (1805–1885), American Congregational pastor and author
- William Lloyd Barry (1916–1999), member of the Governing Body of Jehovah's Witnesses and related offices

== Sports ==
- Bill Barry (1899–1955), Australian rules footballer
- Ray Barry (ice hockey) (William Raymond Barry, 1928–2018), American-born Canadian hockey player
- William Barry (footballer) (1929–2007), Irish footballer
- William L. Barry (born 1940), British rower and coach

== Other ==
- William Gerard Barry (1864–1941), Irish artist
- William R. Barry (1828–1900), American businessman and advocate for the deaf
- William J. Barry (born 1943), Irish phonetician
- William Farquhar Barry (1818–1879), U.S. Army officer in the Mexican–American and American Civil wars
- William Jackson Barry (1819–1907), New Zealand adventurer and writer

== See also ==
- William Parry (disambiguation)
