= Edward Barry =

Edward Barry may refer to:

== Sports ==
- Ed Barry (baseball) (1882–1920), American Baseball pitcher
- Eddie Barry (ice hockey) (1919–2016), American ice hockey player
- Edward Barry (cricketer) (1898–1965), Irish cricketer
- Son Barry (Edward Barry, 1877–1959), Australian rules footballer for Essendon
- Ned Barry (Edward Fitzgerald Barry, 1905–1993), New Zealand rugby union player

== Others ==
- Eddie Barry (actor) (1887–1966), American actor
- Edward Barry (Irish nationalist politician) (1852–1927), member of parliament (MP) for South Cork, 1892–1910
- Edward Barry (writer) (1759–1822), English writer
- Edward Middleton Barry (1830–1880), English architect
- Edward B. Barry (1849–1938), rear admiral of the United States Navy
- Edward P. Barry (1864–1936), lieutenant governor of Massachusetts
- Sir Edward Barry, 1st Baronet (1696–1776), Irish physician and MP for Charleville
- J. Edward Barry (1874–1932), mayor of Cambridge, Massachusetts

== See also ==
- Edward Barry: South Sea Pearler, a 1900 novel by Louis Becke
- Barry (name)
