= Kevin Barry (disambiguation) =

Kevin Barry (1902–1920) was an Irish republican who was hanged.

Kevin Barry may also refer to:

== Arts ==
- Kevin Barry (writer) (born 1969), Irish writer
- Kevin Barry (playwright) (born 1951), American playwright
- "Kevin Barry" (song), a 1920s popular ballad about the executed Irish republican
- Kevin Barry (Neighbours), a fictional character from the soap opera Neighbours in 1985

== Sportspeople ==
- Kevin Barry (American football) (born 1979), American football player
- Kevin Barry (baseball) (born 1978), American baseball player
- Kevin Barry (boxer) (born 1959), New Zealand boxing trainer and former light-heavyweight boxer
  - Kevin Barry Sr. (c. 1936–2011) his father, also a New Zealand boxing trainer
- Kevin Barry (equestrian) (1920–2002), Irish Olympic equestrian
- Kevin Barry (footballer) (born 1961), English football goalkeeper
- Kevin Barry (rugby league) (1950–2012), New Zealand rugby league international
- Kevin Barry (rugby union) (1936–2014), New Zealand rugby union player

== See also ==
- Kevin Berry (1945–2006), Australian swimmer
