= Des Barry =

Des Barry may refer to:

- Desmond Barry (born 1954), Welsh author
- Des Barry (footballer) (1933–2015), Australian rules footballer
