= William Parry =

William or Bill Parry may refer to:

== Sports ==
- William Crake (1852–1921), or William Parry, Wanderers footballer
- Bill Parry (footballer, born 1873) (1873–1923), Welsh international footballer
- Bill Parry (umpire) (1890–1955), English cricket umpire
- Bill Parry (footballer, born 1914) (1914–1964), English footballer for Leeds United
- Bill Parry (footballer, born 1933) (1933–2009), Welsh footballer for Gillingham

== Politicians ==
- William Parry (c. 1517–c. 1569), MP for Carmarthen Boroughs
- William Thomas Parry (1837–1896), Welsh American politician in Wisconsin
- William John Parry (1842–1927), Welsh businessman, politician and author
- Bill Parry (politician) (1878–1952), from New Zealand

== Others ==
- William Parry (spy) (died 1585), Welsh conspirator
- William Parry (priest) (1687–1756), English priest and antiquarian
- William Parry (Royal Navy officer, born 1705) (1705–1779), commander-in-chief of the Jamaica Station
- William Parry (artist) (1743–1791), Welsh artist
- William Parry (tutor) (1754–1819), Welsh Congregational minister and academy head
- William Edward Parry (1790–1855), British Arctic explorer
- William Parry-Okeden (1840–1926), Australian official
- William T. Parry (1908–1988), American philosopher
- Bill Parry (mathematician) (1934–2006), British mathematician
- William Parry (photojournalist) (born 1969), who has written on the Israeli West Bank barrier
- Will Parry (His Dark Materials), a protagonist from the His Dark Materials trilogy by Philip Pullman

== See also ==
- William Barry (disambiguation)
- William Perry (disambiguation)
