= Peter Barry =

Peter Barry may refer to:

- Peter Barry (equestrian) (born 1956), Canadian Olympian
- Peter Barry (footballer) (1937–2005), VFL footballer for Carlton
- Peter Barry (hurler) (born 1974), Kilkenny inter-county hurler
- Peter Barry (poet) (born 1947), British writer and academic
- Peter Barry (politician) (1928–2016), Irish politician
- Peter H. Barry, American geochemist

== See also ==
- Peter Berry (disambiguation)
