= Mary Barry =

Mary Barry may refer to:

- Mary Barry (singer) (born 1955), Canadian singer and songwriter
- Mary Barry O'Delaney (1862–1947), Irish journalist and nationalist
- Mary F. Barry (1859–1919), state legislator in Colorado
- Mary Gonzaga Barry (1834–1915), Catholic educator and founder of schools

== See also ==
- For subjects named Mary Berry see Mary Berry (disambiguation)
