= Joan Barry =

Joan Barry may refer to:

- Joan Barry (British actress) (1903–1989), starred in The Card
- Joan Barry (American actress) (1920–2007), sued Charlie Chaplin over paternity in 1943
- Joan Barry (politician) (born 1941), American politician
