= Barri (surname) =

Barri is a surname. Notable people with the surname include:

- Barta Barri (1911–2003), Hungarian-born Spanish film actor
- Diego Barri (born 1995), Spanish professional footballer
- Felipe de Barri (died 1784) was comandante of Alta California
- Gerard Barri (born 2001), Spanish footballer
- Gerald de Barri, 14th-century mediaeval Bishop of Cork
- Giacomo Barri (died 1690), Italian painter and printmaker of the Baroque period
- Mario Barri (1928–1963), Filipino actor and film director
- Odoardo Barri, the pseudonym of Edward Slater (1844–1920)
- R. Barri Flowers, (born 1956), American writer of mystery novels and non-fiction books, as well as a criminologist
- Steve Barri (born 1942), American songwriter and record producer
- Tarik Barri (born 1979), Dutch audiovisual composer

== See also ==
- Barris (surname)
- Barry (surname)
- Barri Griffiths (born 1982), Welsh stunt performer, actor, and former professional wrestler
- Barri Jones (1936–1999), classical scholar and archaeologist
- Barry, Vale of Glamorgan, known as Barri in the Welsh language
- Barri, Star Wars creature
