= Peter Berry =

Peter Berry may refer to:

- Peter Berry (basketball) (born 2001), American wheelchair basketball player
- Peter Berry (priest) (1935–2018), Provost of Birmingham Cathedral
- Peter Berry (footballer) (1933–2016), English footballer

== See also ==
- Peter Barry (disambiguation)
