= Orla Barry (artist) =

Irish artist

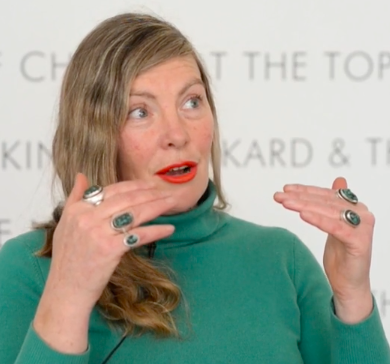
- Orla Barry (2019)
- Website: http://www.orlabarry.be

Orla Barry is an Irish artist who works in a variety of media: performance, video, text and sound. She also runs a flock of pedigree Lleyn sheep on the south coast of Ireland.

She is lecturer at the Institute of Technology, Carlow and a former Advising Researcher at the Jan Van Eyck Academie.

== Biography ==
She lived for 16 years in Brussels and now lives and works in County Wexford in the South-East Ireland where she runs a flock of pedigree and Lleyn sheep.

She has had performances at Performatik 17, Brussels, Dublin Theatre Festival, the Project Arts Centre, Dublin; Centre for Fine Arts, Brussels (BOZAR), Brussels, the South London Gallery and the Tate Modern, London; If I Can't Dance, De Appel, Amsterdam; and The Playground Festival, Leuven.

She has also had solo shows at Mu.Zee, Oostend (with Els Dietvorst), Crawford Art Gallery, Cork. ARGOS Centre for Art and Media, Brussels. Temple Bar Gallery and Studios and Mother's Tankstation, Dublin; Cultural Centre of Belém (CCB), Museu Colecção Berardo, Lisbon with Rui Chafes; Irish Museum of Modern Art, Dublin; Stedelijk Museum voor Actuele Kunst (S.M.A.K.), Ghent; Camden Arts Centre, London; and BOZAR, Brussels. She has been awarded the prize of the Palais de Beaux Arts in the Prix de la Jeune Peinture Belge in 2003 and was short-listed for the Glen Dimplex Prize in 1999.
