= Barry-Murphy =

Barry-Murphy is a surname, and may refer to:

- Brian Barry-Murphy (born 1978), Irish soccer player and manager
- Dinny Barry-Murphy (1903–1973), Irish hurler
- Jimmy Barry-Murphy (born 1954), Irish hurler, Gaelic footballer and manager
- John Barry-Murphy (1892–1975), Irish sportsperson

== See also ==
- Barry (surname)
- Murphy (surname)
