= William Perry =

William, Bill or Will Perry may refer to:

== Business ==
- William H. Perry (businessman) (1832–1906), American businessman and entrepreneur
- William Perry (Queensland businessman) (1835–1891), businessman and politician in Queensland, Australia

== Politics and law ==
- William W. Perry (1834–?), Wisconsin state assemblyman
- William H. Perry (South Carolina politician) (1839–1902), U.S. representative from South Carolina
- Sir William Perry (New Zealand politician) (1885–1968), member of the New Zealand Legislative Council
- William C. Perry (1900–1985), chief justice of the Oregon Supreme Court
- William J. Perry (born 1927), American businessman and former secretary of defense
- William H. Perry III (1940–2024), Missouri politician

== Sports ==
- William Perry (boxer) (1819–1880), English boxer known as the "Tipton Slasher"
- William Perry (cricketer) (1830–1913), English cricketer
- Bill Perry (rugby union) (1886–1970), Welsh rugby union player
- Bill Perry (footballer) (1930–2007), South Africa born English footballer
- William Perry (American football) (born 1962), American football defensive tackle, nicknamed "The Refrigerator"
- Will Perry (born 1994), American basketball player

== Others ==
- William F. Perry (1823–1901), Confederate brigadier general, first Alabama superintendent of public education, self-taught professor
- William Stevens Perry (1832–1898), American Protestant Episcopal bishop and educator
- William H. Perry Sr. (1860–1946), African American physician, principal and educator
- William Perry (Scottish priest) (died 1948), Scottish Anglican priest
- William G. Perry (architect) (1883–1975), American architect
- W. J. Perry (William James Perry, 1887–1949), British cultural anthropologist
- Bill Perry (cartoonist) (1905–1995), American cartoonist
- William Haggin Perry (1910–1993), American racehorse breeder and owner
- William G. Perry (psychologist) (1913–1998), American developmental psychologist, son of the architect
- William P. Perry (born 1930), American composer and producer
- Bill Perry (musician) (1957–2007), American blues musician

== See also ==
- William Parry (disambiguation)
