= Du Barry (surname) =

du Barry is a surname, and may refer to:

- Beekman Du Barry (1828–1901), United States Army brigadier general
- Jean-Baptiste du Barry (1723–1794), French nobleman
- Jeanne Bécu, comtesse du Barry, known as Madame du Barry (1743–1793), French courtier

== See also ==
- DuBarry (surname)
- de Barry (surname)
- Barry (surname)
