= Rhoda Barry =

South African librarian, composer and poet

- Born: 7 February 1916; Wakkerstroom, Transvaal (now Mpumalanga), South Africa
- Died: 14 July 2011 (aged 95); Wakkerstroom, South Africa
- Occupations: Librarian, Composer, Poet
- Known for: Composing the children's song "Eendjies, eendjies"
- Notable work: Eendjies, eendjies, Wiegelied

Rhoda Barry (7 February 1916 – 14 July 2011) was a South African librarian, composer, and poet, best known for her contribution to Afrikaans children's songs. She composed the well-known song "Eendjies, eendjies", which is often considered a traditional song of unknown origin. Her work had a lasting influence on early childhood music education in South Africa.

== Early life and career ==
Rhoda Barry was born on 7 February 1916 in Wakkerstroom, then part of the Transvaal. Her father, Cyril Kershaw Barry, was an English-speaking lawyer, and her mother, Eugenie Goddard Knobel, was a survivor of the concentration camps during the Anglo-Boer War. Rhoda matriculated from Ellerslie High School for Girls in Sea Point, Cape Town. Music was one of her school subjects.

== Music and compositions ==
Rhoda's most well-known contribution to the Afrikaans musical heritage is the children's song "Eendjies, eendjies", which was initially published in her collection "Sangstukke vir Kindertjies" and later included in the FAK-Songbooks of 1961 and 1979. Another composition of hers, "Wiegelied" (Lullaby), was also included in the 1961 FAK-Songbook. Her music was considered instrumental in the development of school music programs and childhood education in South Africa. Although Rhoda herself did not teach music, her inclusion in the FAK-Songbooks gave her work a certain institutional recognition.

== Librarianship and literary contributions ==
Rhoda Barry earned her master's degree in library science from the University of Illinois in the USA, where she wrote a thesis titled A Century of Books: 1814-1914; A Preliminary Survey of Literature Suitable for Children in South Africa. After working for a year at the New York Children's Library, she returned to South Africa. She played a key role in making children's literature available in South Africa by designing practical layouts for children's sections and selecting appropriate children's literature. Her expertise in children's library sections was documented in 1956 and applied in every library in the Cape Provincial Library Service. She was also responsible for establishing a children's library section on Robben Island, which was inaugurated on 10 November 1956.

In 1958, she published a revised edition of G.R. von Wielligh's Afrikaans Dierestories (Animal Stories). This publication was included in the reading list for Afrikaans literature students at the University of the Witwatersrand in 1962.

== Selected publications ==
- Sangstukke vir Kindertjies (1943) – A collection with six children's songs and two piano pieces.
- Wiegelied – included in the FAK-Songbook (1961).
- Suid-Afrika, my Volksland (South Africa, My Homeland) – A song that won a prize in a competition organized by the South African Broadcasting Corporation.
- Kom, Kom Boere – A boeremusiek song.
- Dierestories: 'n Keuse uit die Versameling van G.R. von Wielligh (1958) – A revised edition of G.R. von Wielligh's Afrikaans animal stories.
- O Canto da Terra do Natal (The Christmas-Land Carol) – A Christmas carol with a South African character that won a prize.

== Later life and death ==
In her later years, Rhoda Barry focused on her writing and her opposition to the modernization of her hometown, Wakkerstroom. She died on 14 July 2011 at the age of 95.

== Legacy ==
Rhoda Barry's composition "Eendjies, eendjies" remains one of the most well-known Afrikaans children's songs and is still frequently sung today. Her work had a significant impact on Afrikaans culture, particularly in the area of children's music and literature.
