= Henry Barry (British Army officer) =

Colonel Henry Barry (c. 1750–1822) was a British Army officer now known for his military dispatches.

== Biography ==
Barry appears in the Army List as a second lieutenant of 22 February 1763, and was gazetted as an ensign in the 52nd Regiment of Foot on 11 March 1768. He became a lieutenant on 23 September 1772, a captain on 4 January 1777, a major in the army on 19 February 1783, and a regimental major on 11 May 1789. He was a lieutenant-colonel in the army on 18 May 1790, was promoted to a lieutenant-colonelcy in the 39th Regiment of Foot on 8 December 1790, and became a colonel on 19 July 1793.

His regiment, the 52nd, was engaged in the American Revolutionary War, during which Barry acted as aide-de-camp and private secretary to Lord Rawdon, afterwards Marquis of Hastings, who took a major part in it. While on Lord Rawdon's staff he penned some of the despatches to the British cabinet. The 52nd and Lord Rawdon took part in the battle of Bunker's Hill, the battle of Brooklyn and the battle of White Plains; and at the attack on Fort Clinton. Barry was at the time a lieutenant in the 52nd and aide-de-camp to Lord Rawdon. He afterwards served in India.

Returning to England, he appears to have left the army in 1794, and to have settled at Bath, Somerset. He died there on 2 November 1822.
