= Moyra Barry =

Irish artist

- Born: 1886; Dublin, Ireland
- Died: 2 February 1960 (aged 74); Dublin, Ireland
- Resting place: Glasnevin Cemetery
- Awards: 1909 RHA, Best Drawing and Best Composition Prize, 1914 Slade School of Fine Art, First Prize for Painting from the cast

Moyra Barry (1886 – 2 February 1960) was an Irish artist, most noted for her paintings of flowers.

== Early life and education ==
Moyra Aloysius Barry was born in 1886 in Dublin, the eldest of eleven children of Bernard and Jane Barry. Her father worked as a merchant. Although she was named Moyra, she was always known as Mary to her family. Barry attended Loreto Convent, North Great George's St., going on to the Royal Hibernian Academy (RHA) Schools from 1908 to 1909. Whilst studying with the RHA she won a number of prizes for composition and drawing, later moving to London to attend the Slade School of Fine Art from 1911 to 1914, being awarded first prize for painting from the cast 1913 to 1914. She lived and tutored English privately in Quito, Ecuador in the 1920s, before returning to the family home in Rathmines, Dublin in the 1930s.

== Artistic career ==
From 1908 to 1952 Barry was frequently exhibited by the RHA, holding a number of individual shows at the Angus Gallery from 1932 onwards. She was noted for her portraits and landscapes, but was gained a reputation of her painting of flowers. For these flower paintings, Barry worked in watercolours and oils, often depicting chrysanthemums and rhododendrons, drawing inspiration from the waterlillies in the National Botanic Gardens. Dermod O'Brien described Barry as "the finest painter of flowers alive" in 1941, having visited an exhibition at the Victor Waddington Galleries, Dublin.

Barry was a member of the Society of Dublin Painters, being one of the most prominent and leading members in the 1930s and 1940s. She was a member of the Dublin Sketching Club, exhibiting with them regularly in the 1930s. She was occasionally exhibited by the Watercolour Society of Ireland, contributing to group exhibitions in England, the Netherlands, and North America.

== Legacy ==
Barry's work is held in a number of Irish institutions, such as the Crawford Art Gallery, the Ulster Museum, and her Self portrait in the artist's studio (1920) is hung in the National Gallery of Ireland. Barry died in Dublin on 2 February 1960. She is buried at Glasnevin Cemetery.
