= Michael Barry (murderer) =

Australian convicted murderer

Michael Barry (10 September 1843 – 2 June 1890) was a convicted Australian murderer.

Barry was found guilty of murdering his wife, Mary Barry (née McNertney), in Rockhampton, Queensland on 26 February 1890.

He was sentenced to death and was hanged at the Rockhampton Gaol on 2 June 1890.

== Murder ==
The murder took place at the couple's family home in a semi-private lane, off West Street between Archer and Cambridge Streets in the suburb now known as The Range.

It was alleged Barry had begun his relentless, drunken attack on his wife during a prolonged argument regarding a missing purse the afternoon prior to the murder, in which he dragged her by the hair around the house.

The sustained verbal and physical abuse culminated the next morning when Barry continued to physically assault his wife, eventually killing her by using crosscut saw handles and an axe handle to repeatedly strike her. The murder was witnessed by one of their four children, who were all subsequently sent to Meteor Park Orphanage near Stanwell, west of Rockhampton to live.

After murdering his wife, he gave a full confession to police.

Barry appeared in the Rockhampton Police Court on 27 February 1890 charged with the wilful murder of his wife. Among those who gave evidence was his daughter Johanna who witnessed the murder.

Barry was committed for a trial commencing on 23 April 1890.

== Trial ==
Barry's trial began at the Rockhampton Supreme Court on 23 April 1890 before Justice Charles Mein. Barry was represented by Robert Lyons. Barry pleaded not guilty.

With the twelve jury members not being able to agree on a verdict by the end of the day's proceedings, they were locked up for the night. They returned to court the following morning and told Mein they had still not agreed on a verdict with the foreman stating that some jury members had wanted "to make a law for themselves", alluding to their preference to see Barry convicted of manslaughter rather than murder. Mein responded by telling the jury that if they did, they were acting corruptly and were being dishonourable and disgraceful. Mein gave the jury one more opportunity to deliberate and reach a verdict for the offence of which Barry had been charged with.

The jury then deliberated for another ten minutes before returning to the courtroom. When the jury was asked whether they had reached a verdict, the foreman said that they had. When asked if they had found the prisoner guilty or not guilty, the foreman said:

"Guilty - with a strong recommendation to mercy on account of the previous good character which he had, and the strong provocation which he had from his wife"

Mein said he "emphatically concurred" with the jury's verdict of guilty, but said while the recommendation of mercy would be conveyed to the authorities, the matter would lie entirely with the Executive Council of Queensland. Mein warned Barry not to raise false hope of a reprieve before sentencing him to be hanged by the neck until he was dead.

== Petition for reprieve ==
Despite the brutality of his crime, Barry managed to garner some sympathy from some members of the Rockhampton community and the jury at his trial, supposedly motivated by his good standing in the community and a claim that his wife had allegedly been unfaithful. Some believed her act of the "greatest possible immorality" had provoked Barry and because of his "excitable temperament", he was "driven" to murder his wife in "sheer desperation".

Following his sentence, a petition bearing 1,427 signatures along with the 12 men who served on the jury, was presented to the Executive Council urging clemency and a commutation of Barry's death sentence. The Executive Council refused and stated that the course of the law should not be interfered with.

The day before he was hanged, a committee was formed to correspond with William Pattison in Brisbane, in an eleventh-hour bid to spare Barry from the death penalty, citing a doctor's belief that Barry was insane when he committed the murder. Pattison said that while the premier Boyd Dunlop Morehead would arrange a meeting to discuss the case, it wasn't likely the previous decision would be altered. Rockhampton Bishop John Cani also sent a telegram to the Premier urging him to delay the execution until the question of Barry's sanity had been looked into further.

On the eve of the hanging, Pattison eventually relayed the instruction that the execution must be carried out.

== Execution ==
Michael Barry was hanged at 8am on 2 June 1890 at the Rockhampton Gaol.

In his final moments, he was joined by The Reverend Father Stephen McDonough from the Roman Catholic Church who performed a service for Barry. McDonough and a prison officer accompanied Barry to the foot of the scaffold where Barry knelt and recited several prayers. Barry and McDonough then walked up to the executioner on the scaffold. The executioner instructed Barry where to stand and as he took his position and the noose was being adjusted, he exclaimed: "Jesus, have mercy on my soul" which he continued to repeat until the bolt was drawn when he died instantly.

Barry's body hung for approximately five minutes before being lowered and examined by the doctors who were present. The body was then handed over the Barry's friends, and the body was placed in a coffin and transported in a hearse to the South Rockhampton Cemetery where it was buried approximately an hour after he was executed.

Barry was the final person of eight men in total to be executed in Rockhampton.

It was the only one to take place at the second Rockhampton gaol in Wandal, which had replaced the original gaol in 1884. The gaol where Barry's execution took place was demolished in 1948, when it was decided the site would be redeveloped for the proposed Eventide Nursing Home.

His execution was also the last in regional Queensland.

== Press coverage ==
The murder, the trial, the petition for reprieve and Barry's execution were all reported in the press nationally.

Attempts at sparing Barry from the death penalty prompted discussion about capital punishment in the press.

== Burial site ==
Both Michael Barry and the woman he murdered, Mary Barry are buried in the South Rockhampton Cemetery.

Mary Barry's funeral was held the day after her murder, when a procession departed her brother-in-law's residence at 10am and arrived at the South Rockhampton Cemetery a short time later where she was buried on 27 February 1890.
