= Mariama Barry =

Senegalese novelist

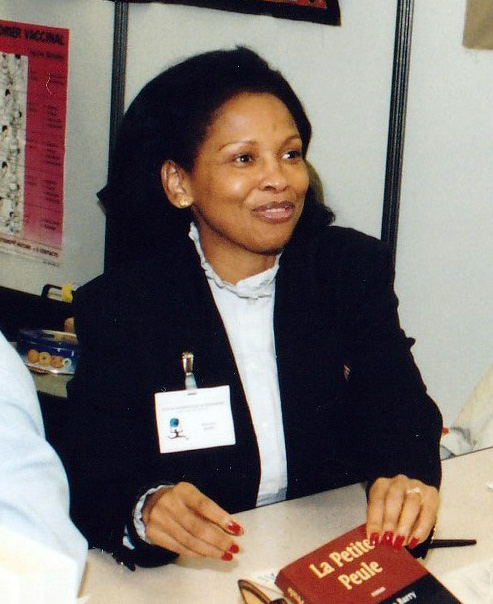
- Mariama Barry in 2000.
- Born: Dakar, Senegal
- Occupation: Novelist
- Writing career
- Notable work: La petite Peul

Mariama Barry is a Senegalese novelist, specializing in autobiographical fiction. Born in Dakar, she spent her teenage years in Guinea before settling in France, where she is also a practicing lawyer. Her first book, La petite Peule, was published in 2000, then in English translation in 2010 as The Little Peul.

== Early life and education ==
Mariama Barry was born in Dakar, the capital of Senegal. Her childhood there was difficult. Because she was born in the capital, her uncles labeled her an ndjouddou, a child born in a foreign land who does not know the codes and traditions of the Fula people of Fouta Djallon, where her parents originated. She was subjected to female genital mutilation. A few years later, her parents divorced, and her mother left the children with her father. As the eldest of seven children, she was forced to take charge of managing the household, which impeded her education.

When Barry was a teenager, her father moved the family to Guinea. She managed to avoid a forced marriage, with the help of her grandmother. She then left Africa to move to France, where she studied to become a lawyer at the University of Paris II Panthéon-Assas.

== Writing ==
Having first begun writing as a teenager, Barry started producing works of autobiographical fiction while continuing her legal career in France. Her first book, the autobiographical novel La petite Peule, was published in 2000. It tells the story of a young African girl whose childhood is stolen.

In her writing, she denounces the mistreatment of women, violence, and unequal access to education.

Her second book, Le cœur n’est pas un genou que l’on plie, was published in 2007. It draws on her teenage years in Guinea and bluntly describes the country's climate under the regime of Ahmed Sékou Touré. A third book was planned, to form a trilogy about her childhood, but it has not been published.

La petite Peule was published in English translation under the title The Little Peul in 2010.

In 2008, Barry also served on the jury of the 8th edition of the Marrakech International Film Festival.

== Selected works ==
- La petite Peule (2000). Paris: Mazarine. ISBN 9782863743225
- Le cœur n’est pas un genou que l’on plie (2007). Paris: Gallimard. ISBN 9782070783960
- The Little Peul (2010 translation). Charlottesville: University of Virginia Press. ISBN 9780813929620
