= Gerald de Barri =

Gerald de Barri or Gerald of Barry, was a mediaeval Bishop of Cork.

Barry was appointed in 1359 and received possession of the temporalities on 2 February 1360. He was appointed again on 8 November 1362 and confirmed on 1 February 1365. He died on 4 January 1393.
