= Bill Parry (footballer, born 1873) =

Welsh footballer

Personal information
- Date of birth: 1873
- Place of birth: Wales
- Date of death: 1923 (aged 49–50)

Senior career*
Years	Team	Apps	(Gls)
- Newtown Excelsior

International career
1895	Wales	1	(0)
- * Club domestic league appearances and goals

Bill Parry (1873–1923) was a Welsh international footballer. He was part of the Wales national football team, playing 1 match on 16 March 1895 against Ireland. At club level, he played for Newtown Excelsior.

== See also ==
- List of Wales international footballers (alphabetical)
