= Kesso Barry =

Guinean writer

- Born: January 1, 1948 (age 77); French Guinea
- Occupation: Writer

Kesso Barry (born 1948) is a Guinean autobiographical writer in French. Her autobiography, dedicated to her daughter, recounts the restrictive gender roles of her traditional upbringing as a member of the Fulani nobility in Guinea-Conakry, and her escape to a Westernised life in Paris.

== Life ==
Kesso Barry's father was Al Hajj Ibrahima Sory-Dara, almamy of Mamou. She was educated in Koranic and primary schools in Mamou, before continuing education in Conakry and Dakar. She married aged 15, and had two children. In 1966, after divorcing her husband, she moved to Paris. There she pursued a successful career in fashion, married a Frenchman, and wrote her autobiographical novel.

== Works ==
- Kesso, princesse peuhle [Kesso, a Fulani princess], Paris: Seghers, 1988. ISBN 978-2232100970
