= Michael A. Barry =

American university professor and historian (born 1948)

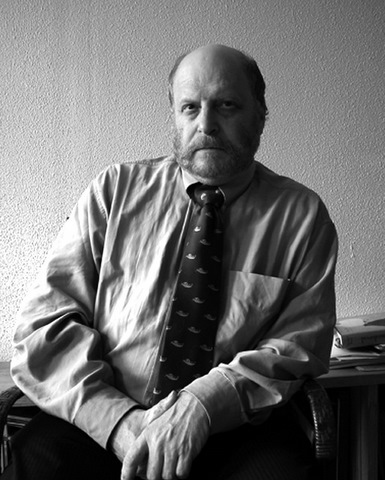
- Born: 1948 (age 77–78); New York, New York

Academic background
- Education: Princeton University; Cambridge University; McGill University; École des Hautes Études en Sciences Sociales
- Influences: Louis Massignon, Stuart Cary Welch

Academic work
- Discipline: Islamic Civilization
- Institutions: Princeton University, Metropolitan Museum of Art, Aga Khan Trust for Culture
- Main interests: Medieval Islamic Civilization, Afghanistan, Culture of Iran, Persian Language

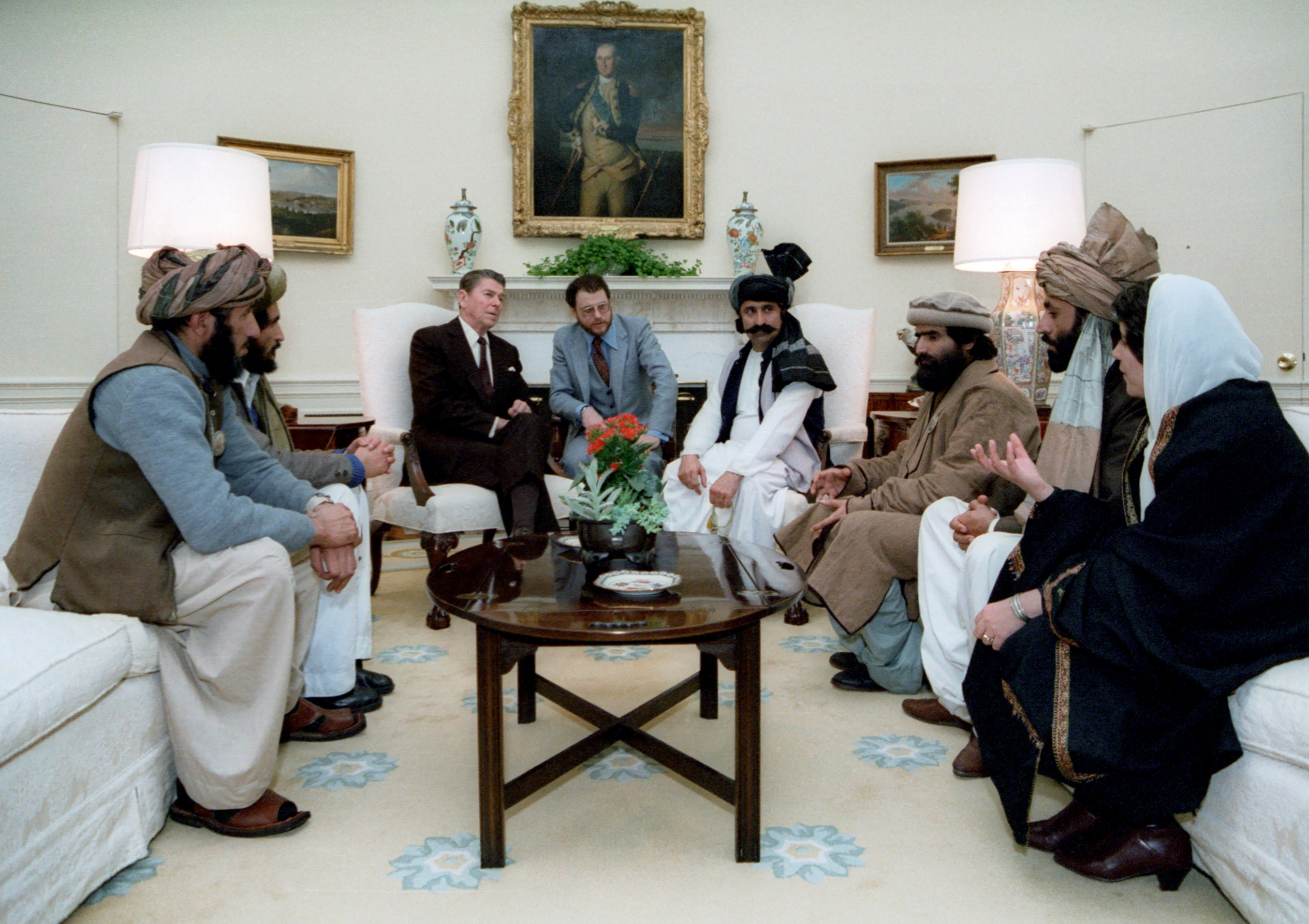
President Ronald Reagan meeting with Afghan Mujahideen in 1983; Barry is at center in gray suit.

Michael A. Barry (born 1948, in New York) is a Princeton University professor and historian of the greater Middle East and Islamic world. Since 2004 he has taught as lecturer in Islamic Culture in Princeton's Department of Near Eastern Studies, in addition to serving as consultative chairman of the Department of Islamic Art at the Metropolitan Museum of Art (2005-2009) and special consultant to the Aga Khan Trust for Culture since 2009. An established authority on Islamic art and the history and culture of Afghanistan, on which subjects he has written extensively in both French and English, Barry's works include a standard French-language history of Afghanistan (Le Royaume de l'insolence), a biography of the late commander of the Afghan Northern Alliance, Ahmad Shah Massoud (Massoud: de l’islamisme à la liberté), which won France's Prix Femina in 2002, and an interpretive history of medieval Islamic figurative painting from the 15th to the 16th centuries (Figurative Art in Medieval Islam and the Riddle of Bihzâd of Herât (1465-1535)).

His most recent work is Kabul's Long Shadows published in 2011 by Princeton University's Liechtenstein Institute on Self-Determination (LISD). This monograph, which summarizes Barry's views on Afghanistan for the first time in English, addresses current U.S. policy toward Afghanistan in light of the country's political and cultural history, its tribal dynamics and the strategic concerns of the surrounding region. He holds an A.B. in Near Eastern Studies from Princeton University, post-graduate degree in anthropology from Cambridge University, M.A. from McGill University and Ph.D. from the École des Hautes Études en Sciences Sociales in Paris.

Prior to coming to Princeton, Barry spent many years in Afghanistan with the International Federation for Human Rights, Médecins du Monde and the United Nations, working in often perilous conditions to provide and coordinate humanitarian assistance for the Afghan people from 1979 to 2001. More than that, as the Daily Princetonian wrote "Barry, a professor in the Near Eastern Studies Department, left his work in academia in the 1980s to fight the Soviet invasion in Afghanistan." Barry would often ride on horseback with Mujahideen fighters as his guide and stay in housing along with as many as "200 exhausted mujaheddin fighters sleeping on the dirt floor." In 1982, Barry testified before the US Senate Foreign Relations Committee on Soviet war crimes and in January of the next year spoke directly with President Reagan in a private meeting. A month later, on February 2, 1983, Michael Barry sat with President Reagan and members of the Mujahideen in the Oval Office to "discuss Soviet atrocities in Afghanistan". Barry served a number of roles over the following years, as an organizer to the International Hearings on Afghanistan in March 1983, as a coordinating officer for Médecins du Monde's clandestine field hospitals from 1985 to 1989, as a consultant and humanitarian team leader in the field for the United Nations from 1989 to 1991, and numerable other roles during his 22 years in Afghanistan. Barry said that "he misses riding his horse over the crest of a hill and seeing nothing but a single plume of smoke rising from a campfire in a barren valley."

Barry wrote a biography of Ahmad Shah Massoud titled "Massoud: de l’islamisme à la liberté" ("Massoud: From Islamism to Freedom"). When giving a seminar at the Massoud Foundation in Kabul on the 16th Anniversary of Massoud's death, Barry gave praise of Massoud military wisdom and humanitarianism. Barry made comments comparing Massoud to Napoleon Bonaparte and Algerian resistance leader Abd Qadir al-Jaza'iri.
