= Paddy Barry (Limerick hurler) =

Irish hurler

Personal information
- Native name: Pádraig de Barra (Irish)
- Born: 13 August 1896 Bruff, County Limerick, Ireland
- Died: 31 October 1967 (aged 71) Shelbourne Road, Limerick, Ireland

Sport
- Sport: Hurling
- Position: Left corner-forward
Clubs
- Years: Club
- Boher; Young Irelands; Fedamore; Fermoy
Club titles
- Limerick titles: 0
Inter-county
- Years: County
- 1917-1921 1922-1923: Limerick; Dublin
Inter-county titles
- Munster titles: 2
- All-Irelands: 1

Patrick Barry (13 August 1896 – 31 October 1967) was an Irish hurler. His championship career with the Limerick and Dublin senior teams lasted from 1917 until 1923.

Raised in the townland of Baggotstown West, in the parish of Knockainey, County Limerick, Barry first played competitive hurling and football with St. Colman's College, Fermoy. His prowess earned him the captaincy of the Munster team that won the 1914 All-Ireland College Hurling Final. That same year he was a member of the Munster team that reached in the All-Ireland College Football Final.

Barry played Gaelic games with a number of clubs, beginning as a Gaelic footballer with Fermoy, with whom he featured in two county senior championship finals. His return to Limerick saw Barry switch codes to hurling and joined the Boher team, while he also lined out with the Young Irelands and Fedamore clubs.

In 1916 Barry was selected for the Limerick junior football team, however, injury prevented him from lining out. He made his senior hurling debut during the 1917 championship. Barry won his sole All-Ireland medal in 1918. He also won a Munster medal that year before winning a second provincial title in 1921. Illness prevented him from participating in the 1921 All-Ireland final. Barry ended his inter-county career playing with Dublin in 1923.

== Honours ==
Limerick

- All-Ireland Senior Hurling Championship (1): 1918
- Munster Senior Hurling Championship (2): 1918, 1921
