= Ellen Barry (attorney) =

American lawyer

Ellen M. Barry (born September 20, 1953) is an American attorney and public interest lawyer who focuses on prisoners' rights. She was a 1998 MacArthur Fellow.

== Life and education ==
She grew up in Somerville, Massachusetts, as the second of ten children. She received a bachelor of arts degree from Swarthmore College in 1975 and a J.D. from New York University Law School in 1978. She was admitted to the State Bar of California in November 1978.

== Career ==
In 1978 Barry founded Legal Services for Prisoners with Children (LSPC), a San Francisco-based nonprofit organization that seeks to address "young people at risk of incarceration, grandparent caregivers, alternatives to incarceration for mothers and children, and improving medical care for women in prisons and jails". where she worked as director and managing attorney until 2001, when she left to work in private practice.

She helped organize the National Network for Women in Prison, and Critical Resistance. She has represented "incarcerated women, pregnant women prisoners, prisoners, and parolees" in lawsuits.
