= Buck Barry =

American actor (1917–1997)

Buck Joseph Barry, born Chester Burry (February 12, 1917 in St. Joseph, MO – December 4, 1997 in El Paso, Texas) was an American actor and radio and television personality.

== Early career ==
In his early career, Barry appeared in small roles in several movies starring Gene Autry, and was a featured performer in a touring Wild West Show. He gained fame as a host for a live Saturday morning and daily afternoon children's television show. Both were broadcast on television station WOOD-TV, the NBC affiliate in Grand Rapids, MI.

== Radio ==
Barry was also well known to early rising factory workers in the Grand Rapids area, with his morning radio show on WOOD am 1300, which was simulcast on WOOD FM at 105.7. Barry had an encyclopedic knowledge of cowboy and American Indian lore. He started his morning show with a spirited yodeling cowboy song which he accompanied with an acoustic guitar. Barry shared stories of American Indian lore and cowboy legends, interspersed with recorded music.

In his radio broadcasts, he spoke to listeners as if he were sitting at their kitchen tables. He often shared postcards from listeners on vacation, and saluted local listeners' birthdays and anniversaries. His programs were flexible rather than adhering to a strict format.

== Buckaroo Rodeo ==
=== Weekday broadcasts ===
On television, he hosted the Buckaroo Rodeo. Locally, he was as popular as Buffalo Bob or Captain Kangaroo. Initially he hosted the Monday, Wednesday, and Friday shows while Don Melvoin as Fireman Freddie covered Tuesdays and Thursdays. In time, Melvoin stepped away from his role and Barry became the Monday through Friday host. Barry used the Thunder and Lightning Polka from Die Fledermaus by Johann Strauss, Jr., for his show's opening theme; he sang the Coopersville Yodel, live, at the close.

During the Buckaroo Rodeo days, an audience of boys and girls sat in bleachers on the stage to watch Popeye cartoons and 3 Stooges shorts. The show was one of the first children's TV programs to have a racially-integrated studio audience. Barry occasionally sang a cowboy song, did a rope or whip trick, or twirled his twin six guns. The sponsors provided candy, potato chips, and other snacks. Among gifts he received for being on the show were brass statuettes of Thunder, his horse.

=== Weekend programs ===
For a little while during the 1960s, Barry's show expanded to an hour on Saturday mornings on WOOD-TV 8, and featured a wider range of entertainment and games. The programs, with the pistol-packing cowboy and his white horse Thunder, ran for more than a decade from the mid-1950s to the late 1960s. The original Thunder died in a stable fire at some point during the show's run. Subsequent to the stable fire, the national network TV show named This is Your Life, hosted by Ralph Edwards, honored Barrys career. It was announced by Ralph Edwards at the show's conclusion, that enough money had been raised by the fans, allowing Barry to purchase his next horse, which Barry named Thunder II.

Barry hosted the high-rated afternoon Popeye Theater (the original name of the show was the Buckaroo Rodeo), which featured repeated airings of The Three Stooges, and were often followed by admonitions from Barry, warning his children viewers not to try a particular dangerous Stooges stunt, such as hitting someone in the head with a hammer.

Throughout the 1960s, Buck Barry's big Buick station wagon was well known among children in West Michigan. Gold in color, the Buick had fake wood sides with "BUCK BARRY" written in large cursive on both sides using real rope. The hood was adorned by a large pair of forward-pointing Texas longhorns.

Part of the Barry show was a section called "Can Buck Do It?" where Barry attempted various feats, such as tearing a telephone book in half. Barry was known for his on-air flubs, stuttering, and malapropisms, often hopelessly but humorously mangling commercials for such long-time sponsors as BeMo Potato Chips.

== Retirement ==
During his television years in Michigan, Barry was known for visiting and performing for children in local hospitals. Barry retired in the early 1970s to El Paso, Texas, where he lived for 25 years, and continued to perform occasionally. He died in 1997, preceded by his wife, Violet.
