= Eloïne Barry =

Senegalese businesswoman

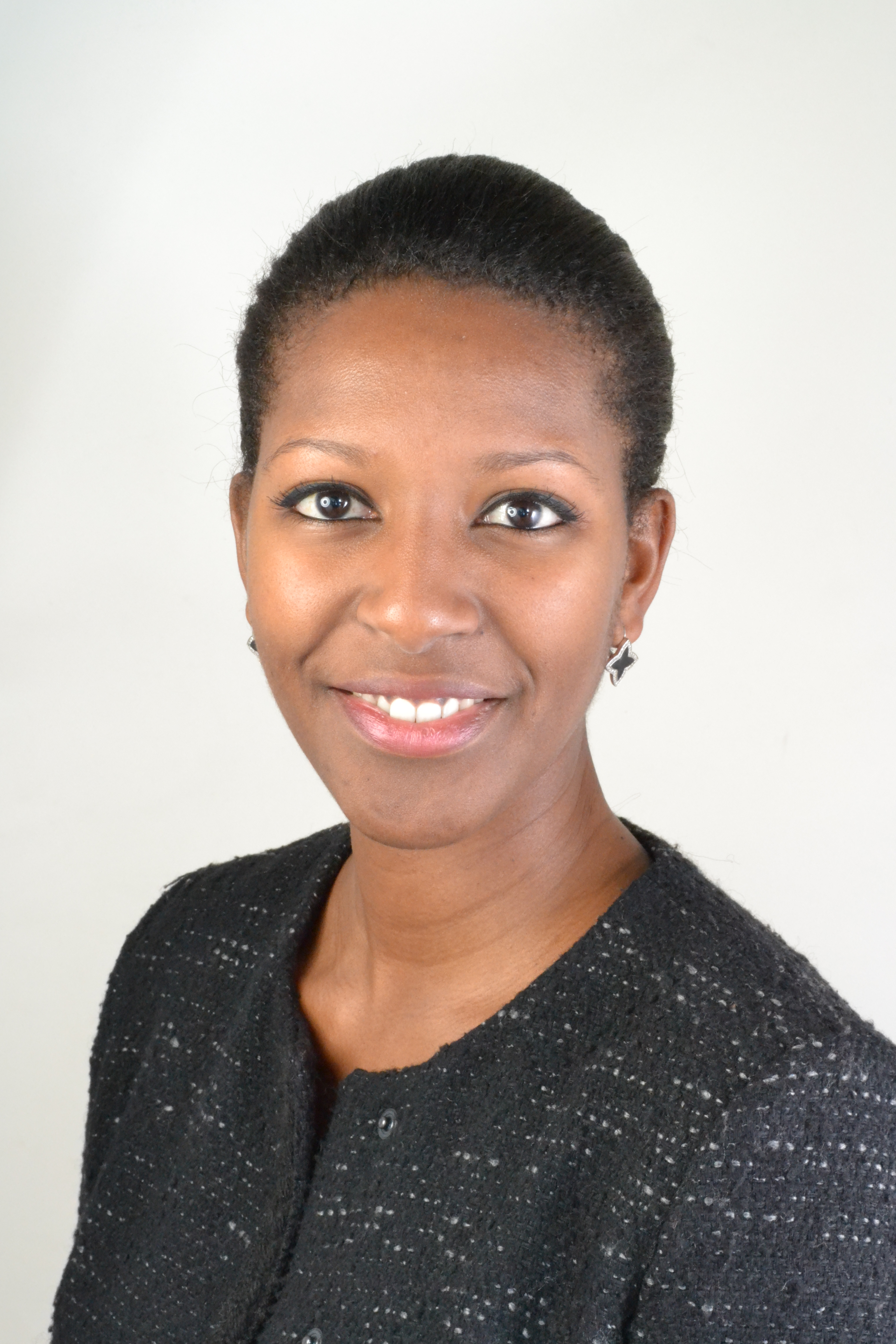
- Eloïne Barry

Founder - CEO of African Media Agency

Former Executive Director of the African Press Organization

Personal details
- Education: French School for Press Officers & Professional Communicators
- Alma mater: Catholic University of Lyon
- Awards: Grand Prix d'Excellence de l'ASCOM (2019), Most Influential People of African Descent (MIPAD) - Culture & Media (2018)
- Website: www.africanmediaagency.com

Eloïne Barry (born 1981, Lyon, France) is a communications strategist, entrepreneur, and authority on African media and market entry. She is the founder and chief executive of African Media Agency, an award-winning, women-owned and led, pan-African communications agency and strategic market entry partner, helping organizations navigate and succeed across African markets and beyond. Her career spans more than two decades building the infrastructure through which African stories reach global audiences, and through which global organizations build credibility across the continent.

== Early life ==
Barry was born in Lyon, France, to a Senegalese mother and a father from Guinea-Bissau. Growing up between cultures gave her an early, firsthand understanding of how Africa is perceived and discussed from the outside, a perspective that would later shape the direction of her professional life.

She graduated in 2003 with a Bachelor of Arts in English Literature from Université Lyon 2, and a Degree in Translation and International Relations from ESTRI. In 2005, she completed a Master's in Communications from EFAP Lyon, establishing a rigorous foundation in how messages are created, translated, and deployed across cultures.

== Career at PR agencies ==
=== PR Newswire ===
Barry began her career at PR Newswire PR Newswire as a Media Relations Executive. Fluent in French and German, she managed media outreach across France and the DACH region and supported the French sales team by ensuring key media participation in client distribution. Within a year, she was promoted to Media Relations Team Leader, overseeing a team of eight executives across the EMEA and India region.

In this role, she organized a series of "Meet the Media" events, bringing journalists from outlets including The Economist, the Guardian, the Financial Times, and The Times to speak with PR professionals. She developed strong relationships with sector-specific publications, driving increased coverage for PR Newswire clients and sharpening her understanding of how global media systems are built and operated.

=== African Press Organization ===
When Barry joined the APO Group as Executive Director, it was a non-governmental organization providing basic press release distribution and press conference access for African journalists. Within her first year, she transformed it into the continent's only commercial wire service, disseminating press releases across all 54 African states.

The results were tangible: revenue grew by 300%, and she built a full operational team spanning project managers, sales executives, and translators. She introduced virtual press conference technology ahead of its widespread adoption and secured landmark partnerships with Thomson Reuters, Bloomberg, Dow Jones Factiva, and LexisNexis, connecting African media to the world's leading information pipelines.

This was not just an operational turnaround. It was a structural shift: for the first time, African organizations had a reliable, continent-wide system for communicating their stories with the same rigor as their global counterparts.

=== African Media Agency ===
In 2015, Barry founded African Media Agency as a direct response to a gap she had observed across her career: organizations operating in Africa needed more than distribution. They needed strategy, context, and partners who understood how the continent actually works.

African Media Agency is headquartered in Abidjan, with offices in Johannesburg, Durban, Accra, and New York, and a presence in over 30 African markets.

AMA combines on-the-ground intelligence with strategic communications to support market entry, shape policy conversations, and drive outcomes across awareness, reputation, and growth. Through an integrated approach spanning public relations, reputation management, crisis preparedness, digital communications, and content, AMA delivers campaigns that influence perception and unlock opportunities with key stakeholders.

AMA has run projects in over 35 countries, works with more than 80 clients, operates in 14 languages, and has generated over 30,000 pieces of coverage, from leading local and regional publications to international outlets including CNN, The Economist, and The Guardian.

=== AMA Academy ===
Alongside the agency, Barry founded AMA Academy, an e-learning platform designed to train and upskill journalists and communications professionals across the continent. To date, AMA Academy has trained more than 350 journalists from 35 African countries. Its Finance Journalism Program focuses specifically on the quality and depth of financial reporting, equipping journalists with the tools to cover economic and financial matters with accuracy and insight.

AMA Academy reflects Barry's long-standing conviction that strong media is not a luxury, it is part of a country's infrastructure. Without it, accountability weakens, stories go untold, and the public loses one of its most important safeguards.

== Professional Philosophy ==
Barry is known for a communications philosophy built on alignment, ethics, clarity, and consistency. She is a vocal proponent of the view that communications is not a support function: it is central to business strategy. Her position is that good communications accounts for 50% of a company's success. A strong product paired with poor reputation or low visibility will not go far.

She has consistently argued against noise-for-visibility, the trap of generating activity without substance. Her approach is rooted in precision: understanding the specific media environment, the stakeholder landscape, and the cultural context of each market before making a move. On the continent, she notes, those contexts differ significantly between francophone, anglophone, and lusophone markets, and between regional blocs such as ECOWAS and SADC.

Her core metaphor for communications: it is the backbone of a business, the centerpiece that aligns what an organization stands for, and how it wants to be perceived. Without it, nothing holds.

== Awards and nominations ==
Barry has received consistent recognition across her field:

Named one of the Most Influential People of African Descent (MIPAD) in 2018[1].

Recipient of the Prize of Excellence by ASCOM in 2019. Nominated for two consecutive years as Woman of the Year in the Media category by New African Women.

SABRE Awards Africa 2026, West Africa, for the Heal by Hair campaign with Bluemind Foundation, one of the world's most competitive public relations awards.

Selected as part of the inaugural cohort of Semafor World Economy Principals, convened alongside the IMF and World Bank Spring Meetings in Washington.

=== Board Positions and Civic Engagement ===
Barry sits on the board of Bluemind Foundation and is one of the founding members of Africa Comms Week[2].
