= Roberto Barry =

Uruguayan comedian (1917–1981)

Roberto Cesar Perez Ruibal better known by his pen name Roberto Barry (1920–1980) was a comedian, singer, journalist, actor, writer and radio and television comedy writer from Uruguay. He was born on October 12, 1920, in Montevideo and died on June 12, 1980.

== Career ==
Up to 1936, he used to act, accompanied by his guitar, in the Centenario cinema in Montevideo. After this he received a proposal to officiate as a radio singer, which took shape a few days after one the radio station El Espectador. Soon after he emigrated to Buenos Aires where he managed to sing only on a small radio station. During this period he met Adrian Lobato, from whom he received an offer to tour through Patagonia. At his request Roberto adopted the pseudonym by which would be recognized in his artistic life.

In 1948 he won first prize in the magazine category during the Uruguayan carnival, shared with "El Charro Carol."

In his varied artistic career he was always noted as one of the foremost exponents of dirty jokes (adult humor).

== Phonograms ==
Among his many phonograms are recordings made with the Indiana Pals Orchestra, conducted by Mancuso and Comesaña. There are others made with Lucio Milena, Louis Caruso, Panchito Nolé, Julio Frade and Ruben Rada, among many others. He also benefited from a profusion of solo productions, with records produced by his own label "Errebe".

== Discography ==
- Balada al voluble (Moody Ballad) Vol.1
- El médico de la risa (The doctor of laughter) vol. 1
- El médico de la risa (The doctor of laughter) vol. 2
- El médico de la risa (The doctor of laughter) vol. 3
- Hay una cama en su futuro (The doctor of laughter) vol. 1
- Hay una cama en su futuro (The doctor of laughter) vol. 2
- Hay una cama en su futuro (The doctor of laughter) vol. 3
- Recital de humor verde (Recital of green humor)
- Los gordos / El matrimonio (Fat People/ Marriage)
- Festival en una mesa (Festival at a table) vol. 1 (Errebe)
- Festival en una mesa (Festival at a table) vol. 2 (Errebe. Recorded lived at the Nuevo Stella Theater)
- Festival en una mesa (Festival at a table) vol. 3 (Errebe)
- Roberto Barry y sus cositas (Robert Barry and his stuff) (Errebe 509)
- Ruben Rada y Roberto Barry (Ruben Rada and Robert Barry) (Errebe 511. 1975)
- Conferencias de Roberto Barry (Robert Barry Conferences)
