= Robert A. Barry =

American politician (1860–1934)

Robert Alexander Barry

Member of the Missouri House of Representatives from the Mississippi County district
- In office 1929–1934
- In office 1917–19341923

Personal details
- Born: August 7, 1860 Texas, U.S.
- Died: November 12, 1934 Ohio Township, Mississippi County, Missouri, U.S.
- Party: Democratic
- Spouse: Laura A. Allen
- Occupation: Politician, judge, farmer

Robert Alexander Barry (August 7, 1860 - November 12, 1934) was an American politician and judge from Mississippi County, Missouri, who served in the Missouri House of Representatives. He died in 1934.
