= Martin Barry =

British physician

Martin Barry (28 March 1802, Fratton, Portsmouth, Hampshire – 27 April 1855, Beccles, Suffolk), was a British physician who studied histology and embryology.

== Career ==
He qualified as a doctor in Edinburgh in 1833, and then studied at the University of Heidelberg. He was elected a fellow of the Royal Society in 1840, and had the previous year, in 1839, been awarded the Society's Royal Medal for his work on embryology. He was the first to discover the segmentation of yolk in the mammalian ovum. He enunciated the doctrine that all cells were descended from an original mother cell by cleavage of the nucleus. One of his most fundamental discoveries, published in Philosophical Transactions in 1843, was that spermatozoa could sometimes be found inside the ovum. The note that Barry published was titled On the Penetration of Spermatozoa into the Interior of the Ovum. This work, carried out with rabbits, influenced Theodor Ludwig Wilhelm Bischoff's theories concerning fertilisation, but it was not until 1876 that Oscar Hertwig, working with sea urchins, described the fusion of sperm and egg to form a new structure.

He was President of the Royal Medical Society of Edinburgh in 1836.

== Sources ==
- "Barry, Martin" . Dictionary of National Biography. London: Smith, Elder & Co. 1885–1900.
- Entry for Barry in the Royal Society's Library and Archive catalogue's details of Fellows (accessed 21 April 2008)
