= Joe Barry (rugby union) =

South African rugby union player (b. 1876, d. 1961)

- Born: Joseph Barry; 16 March 1876 Robertson, Cape Colony
- Died: 29 March 1961 (aged 85)
- School: Bishops

Rugby union career
- Position: Wing
Provincial / State sides
Years	Team	Apps	(Points)
1903	Western Province	0	(0)
International career
Years	Team	Apps	(Points)
1903	South Africa	3	(3)
- Correct as of 1 June 2019

Joe Barry (16 March 1876 – 29 March 1961) was a South African international rugby union player who played as a wing.

He made 3 appearances for South Africa against the British Lions in 1903.
