= Ron Barry (footballer) =

Australian rules footballer

Personal information
- Full name: Ronald Joseph Barry
- Born: 27 October 1923; Albert Park, Victoria
- Died: 5 July 1978 (aged 54); Dandenong South, Victoria
- Height: 185 cm (6 ft 1 in)
- Weight: 86 kg (190 lb)
- Position: Defence

Playing career^{1}
Years	Club	Games (Goals)
1946–50	South Melbourne	54 (6)
- ^{1} Playing statistics correct to the end of 1950.

Ronald Joseph Barry (27 October 1923 – 5 July 1978) was an Australian rules footballer who played with South Melbourne in the Victorian Football League (VFL).

== Personal life ==
Barry served as a private in the Australian Army during the Second World War.
