= Lleyn sheep =

British breed of sheep

An ewe

Ewe and lamb in Llangan, in Wales

The Lleyn is a British breed of sheep. It originates on – and is named for – the Llŷn peninsula ('Lleyn'), in Gwynedd in north-west Wales.

It is bred for prolificacy, good mothering, longevity and easy lambing. It is suited to both upland and lowland grazing.

It is reared primarily for meat.
