= Bridgette Barry =

American biophysicist and biochemist (1957–2021)

- Born: March 1, 1957
- Died: January 20, 2021 (aged 63)
- Education: University of California, Berkeley Oberlin College
- Scientific career
- Fields: Molecular Biophysics
- Workplaces: Georgia Tech University of Minnesota

Bridgette Anne Barry (March 1, 1957 – January 20, 2021) was an American biophysicist and biochemist. She was a professor and researcher of molecular biophysics and biochemistry in the Georgia Tech chemistry and biochemistry department from 2003 until her death. Her research focused on protein electron and oxygen evolution mechanisms.

== Education ==
Barry attended Oberlin College in Oberlin, Ohio, and received a Bachelor of Arts in chemistry with high honors in 1978. She later received her Ph.D. in chemistry at the University of California, Berkeley in December 1984. After receiving her Ph.D., she did post-doctoral training at Michigan State University.

== Career ==
Barry began her teaching career at the University of Minnesota in 1988 as a professor and later became a professor at the Georgia Institute of Technology in 2003. She was a member of Georgia Institute of technology's Parker H. Petit Institute for Bioengineering and Bioscience.

=== Research ===
Barry's lab focused on how the protein matrix facilitates biological catalysis by utilizing spectroscopic, biochemical, and structural techniques to describe the reaction coordinate. Some topics include photosynthetic water oxidation and solar energy conversion, biomimetic peptide models, and proton-coupled electron transfer and DNA synthesis.

== Awards and honors ==
Barry held the Graduate Opportunity Fellowship at the University of California (1982-1983), McKnight Postdoctoral Fellowship at Michigan State University (1985), Public Health Service Award at the National Institutes of Health (1985-1988), Faculty Summer Research Fellowship at the University of Minnesota (1989), fellowship at the American Association for the Advancement of Science (2009), and fellowship at the American Chemical Society (2010).

She participated in the Bush Foundation Faculty Development Program (1992-1993) and received the Bush Sabbatical Award from the University of Minnesota in 1997. During that same year, Barry also received the Career Advancement Award from the National Science Foundation. She is a national honorary member of Iota Sigma Pi. Barry was awarded the Faculty Mentoring Award from Georgia Institute of Technology in 2012.

=== Death ===
Bridgette Barry had passed away due on January 20th, 2021 from complications from her treatment caused by a severe autoimmune Disease which she had been battling for several years.

== Selected works ==
- Guo, Zhanjun; He, Jiayuan; Barry, Bridgette (2018). "Calcium, conformational selection, and redox-active tyrosine YZ in the photosynthetic oxygen-evolving cluster". Proceedings of the National Academy of Sciences.
- Brahmachari, U.; Gonthier, J.; Sherrill, C; Barry, B. (2018). "Chloride Maintains a Protonated Internal Water Network in the Photosynthetic Oxygen Evolving Complex". ACS Publications.
