= DuBarry (surname) =

DuBarry or Dubarry is a surname, and may refer to:

- Denise DuBarry (1956–2019), American actress, film producer and philanthropist
- Michelle DuBarry (born 1931), Canadian drag queen
- Thibault Dubarry (born 1987), French rugby union footballer
- William Hagan DuBarry (1894–1958), American academic administrator

== See also ==
- du Barry (surname)
