= Colm Barry =

Irish hurler

Personal information
- Native name: Colm de Barra (Irish)
- Born: 1993 (age 32–33) Castlelyons, County Cork, Ireland
- Occupation: Primary school teacher

Sport
- Sport: Hurling
- Position: Full-back
Club
- Years: Club
- Castlelyons
Club titles
- Cork titles: 3
College
- Years: College
- Mary Immaculate College
College titles
- Fitzgibbon titles: 1
Inter-county*
Years	County	Apps (scores)
2019-	Cork	0 (0-00)
Inter-county titles
- Munster titles: 0
- All-Irelands: 0
- NHL: 0
- All Stars: 0
- *Inter County team apps and scores correct as of 16:25, 23 February 2019.

Colm Barry (born 1993) is an Irish hurler who plays for Cork Premier Championship club Castlelyons and at inter-county level with the Cork senior hurling team. He usually lines out as a full-back.

== Honours ==
Mary Immaculate College

- Fitzgibbon Cup (1): 2016

Imokilly

- Cork Senior Hurling Championship (3): 2017, 2018, 2019

Cork

- All-Ireland Intermediate Hurling Championship (1): 2014
- Munster Intermediate Hurling Championship (1): 2014
