= Bob Barry (photographer) =

American actor and photographer

- Born: Robert Barry Horowitz; March 17, 1943 (age 83); Suffern, New York, US
- Occupations: Photographer, actor

Bob Barry (born March 17, 1943) is an American actor and photographer based in Los Angeles, California. He is known for his "performance portraits" of jazz, R&B and blues musicians.

== Early life and acting career ==
Barry was born Robert Barry Horowitz in Suffern, New York. He grew up in Spring Valley, New York and worked as an actor in New York City. As Robert Barry, he appeared Off-Off Broadway in Alligator Man, Off-Broadway in The Brass Butterfly with Sam Waterston and made his Broadway debut in the 1976 musical So Long, 174th Street starring Robert Morse. During this period Barry established side careers as a lounge entertainer working in the restaurants, lounges and hotels of Manhattan and as a television commercial performer. Among his commercial assignments was the role of a singing raisin for Post Raisin Bran.

== Photography career ==
While pursuing acting work in New York, Barry was a model for photographer Diane Arbus's 1968 Zeiss-Ikon Camera ad campaign. Upon moving to Los Angeles in 1980, he developed an interest in professional photography. His subsequent friendship with guitarist John Pisano led Barry to photograph over 160 noted jazz guitarists at Pisano's weekly "Guitar Night" event, including George Van Eps, Herb Ellis, Al Viola, Howard Alden, Joe Diorio, Anthony Wilson, Jimmy Wyble, Dori Caymmi and Phil Upchurch.

Barry's mentor, photographer Ray Avery, used the phrase "performance portrait" to describe Barry's approach of photographing musicians during performance using only available light. Barry practiced his craft at jazz festivals, concerts and clubs in the Los Angeles area, such as Vitello's, Catalina's and the Jazz Bakery, which made him their official photo archivist in 2012. His photographs have appeared in the artwork for music releases by Kenny Burrell, Rosemary Clooney, Diane Schuur, Pat Martino, Mary Stallings, Mark Murphy, Johnny Rivers and Danny Seraphine.

Barry serves on the board of directors of the California Jazz Foundation, a charitable 501c3 organization that helps California jazz and blues artists in need. Barry's photography was the subject of a 2012 documentary by filmmaker Dailey Pike. Titled Bob Barry: Jazzography in Black and White, the nonfiction film is an examination of Barry's life and careers. It was awarded in 2013 at the Tupelo Film Festival.

== Public exhibitions ==
- American Jazz Museum, Kansas City, MO. “Jazz In Black & White” May–August 2008
- Flazh! Alley Gallery, San Pedro, CA. “The Brotherhood” May–June 2008
- Flazh! Alley Studio, San Pedro, CA. “Jazzography: The Color Performance Portraits of Bob Barry” November 29, 2010 – January 8, 2011
- American Jazz Museum, Kansas City, MO. “Reflections of Jazz” July 2011 – October 2011
- Brand Library of Music & Art, Barnsdall Municipal Art Gallery, Hollywood, CA. “The Performance Portraits of Bob Barry” February 2011
- University of Maryland, College Park, MD. “Convergence – Jazz, Films, and the Visual Arts” February 14 – May 31, 2013
- Orange Coast College, Costa Mesa, CA. “Jazzed” April 3–25, 2013
- American Jazz Museum, Kansas City, MO. “Jazzography – The performance Portraits of Bob Barry” May 6 – July 21, 2013
- Crown Plaza Hotel at LAX Jazz Club, Los Angeles, CA. 23 Images (permanent collection)
- Vitello's Restaurant & Jazz Club, Studio City, CA. 40 Images (permanent collection)
- Universal Studios, Henry Mancini Building, Universal City, CA. 19 Images (permanent collection)
