= John Barry (dean of Elphin) =

John Barry (1728–1794) was an Irish Anglican Dean.

Barry was born in Cork and educated at Trinity College, Dublin. He was Dean of Elphin from 1778 until his death in 1794.
