= Richard Hugh Barry =

British Army officer (1908–1999)

Major-General Richard Hugh Barry CB CBE
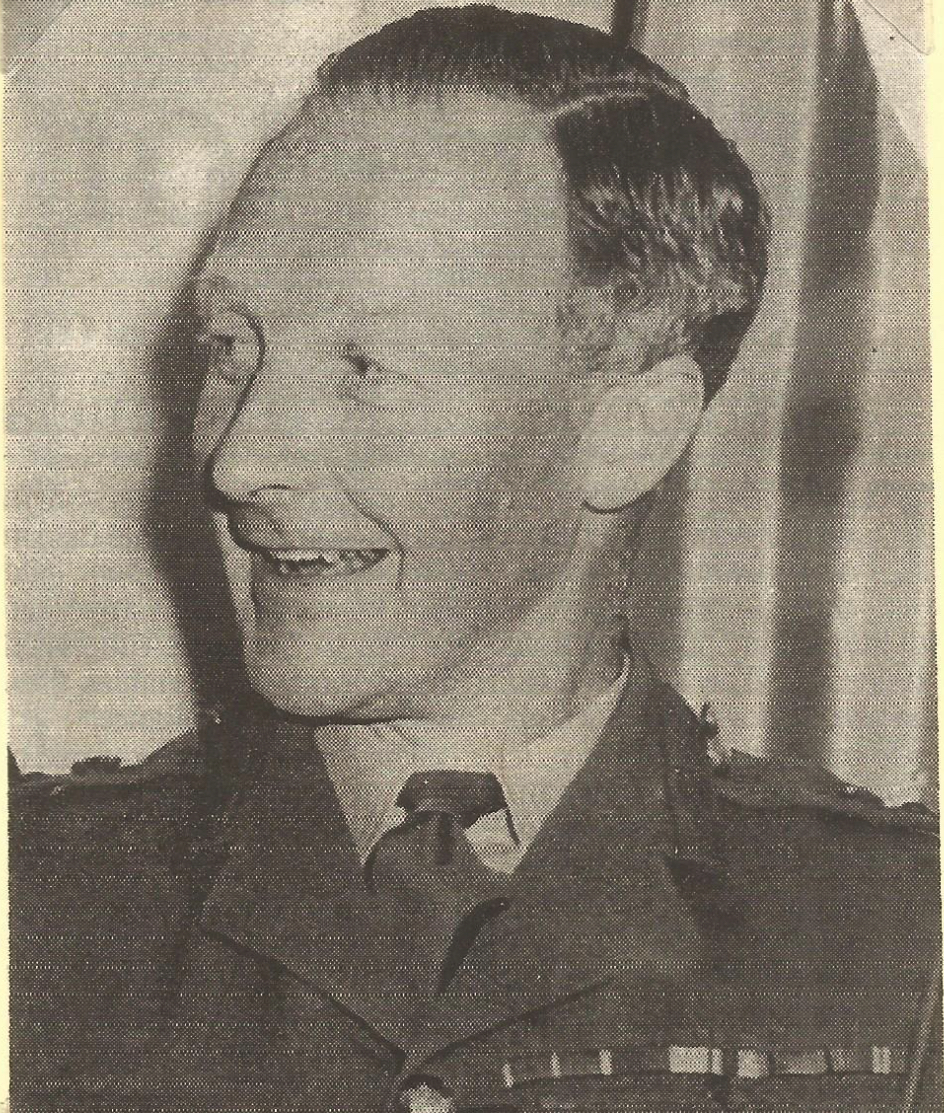
- Barry as Director, NATO Standing Group, 1952
- Born: 9 November 1908; London, England
- Died: 30 April 1999 (aged 90)
- Military career
- Allegiance: United Kingdom
- Branch: British Army
- Service years: 1929–1960
- Rank: Major-General
- Unit: Somerset Light Infantry
- Conflicts: World War II

Major-General Richard Hugh Barry, CB, CBE (9 November 1908 – 30 April 1999) was a British Army officer and a member of the Special Operations Executive during the Second World War.

== Biography ==
Barry was born in London, the only son and elder child of Army officer Lieutenant-Colonel Alfred Percival Barry and Helen Charlotte, née Stephens. His paternal great-grandfather was the architect Sir Charles Barry. He was educated at Winchester College, where he was a commoner, and the Royal Military College, Sandhurst. He was commissioned into the Somerset Light Infantry, his father's regiment, in 1929.

He joined the Special Operations Executive in 1941, first as the head of the operations department. Attached to the planning staff of Dwight D. Eisenhower in November 1942, he was recalled to the SOE in 1943 as Colin Gubbins's chief of staff.

After the war, Barry was posted to Stockholm as military attaché in 1946, before becoming Deputy Chief of Staff, Western Europe Land Forces in 1948.
