= Bibata Niandou Barry =

Nigerien politician and lawyer

Barry Bibata Niandou
- Born: March 2, 1955 (age 70); Niamey
- Known for: Niger's minister for women

Bibata Niandou Barry known as Madame Barry (born 1955) is an activist lawyer who rose to be Niger's minister for women in Mamadou Tandja's government. She is the sister of both the politician Harouna Niandou and the political scientist Abdoulaye Niandou Souley.

== Life ==
Niandou Barry was born on 2 March 1955 and she attended the "Lycée Kassaï" in Niamey. She then studied civil law and graduated in 1990. In 1991, she founded the Association des Femmes Juristes du Niger, an association of women lawyers in Niger. It was among the most active organizations for women's rights during the period of democratic change in Niger in the early 1990s and now supports poorer female litigants.

During the 1990s Niandou Barry's brother Harouna Niandou rose to be a minister in Niger.

Her brief record as Prefect President of the municipality Niamey from 2003 was well received. She had organised a set of games that went well but she was still dismissed the following year.

President Mamadou Tandja took Niandou Barry on 9 June 9, 2007 as the Minister of Women's Promotion and Child Protection in his government. In contravention of the constitution President Tandja decided to take a third term and he was supported by Niandou Barry. This meant that she lost her position when Tandja was overthrown the following year by Salou Djibo. Tandja was notably opposed by her brother, Abdoulaye Souley Niandou. He was rewarded by being appointed a minister but he died within a few months.

Niandou Barry continued her career as a lawyer in Niger.

In 2016 she was the defending lawyer for seven supporters of Hama Amadou. In November 2015 the seven went to meet Amadou at the airport when he returned from abroad. The seven who include Soumana Sanda were charged with ""armed assembly and disturbing public order". They came to what Barry called a "political trial" in July 2016 and they all received a 10 month sentence.
