= Claude Francis Barry =

British painter

Sir Claude Francis Barry, 3rd Baronet (16 December 1884 – 25 October 1970), later calling himself Francis Barry, was a British etcher and painter in oils who often used a pointillist style or a limited palette of flat colours.

== Early life ==
Claude Francis Barry was born in Kensington, London, the eldest son of Sir Edward Arthur Barry, 2nd Baronet, son of Sir Francis Tress Barry, who was awarded the Baronetcy in 1899 for his services to Queen Victoria as a diplomat after making a fortune from mining copper in Portugal. Barry was educated privately and then at Harrow School. On leaving Harrow in 1899 at the age of 16, he travelled in Italy with a tutor for almost a year.

From 1900 Barry studied at Bournemouth Art College and then privately with Sir Alfred East, who was a friend of the family. In 1905 Barry followed East to Newlyn in Cornwall, where a colony of artists had been formed. There Barry also studied with the artist Stanhope Forbes. Barry later moved to St Ives, where another colony of artists had formed after Newlyn became too industrial, and he became involved in the St Ives Society of Artists. Barry was elected to the Royal Society of British Artists in 1906, when Alfred East was its President. Barry is believed to have been exempted from military service during the First World War for medical reasons but was drafted to do agricultural work.

== Career ==
Barry went to live on the Continent in the early 1920s, probably in Menton, France and then in Bordighera and Milan in Italy. He travelled widely in France, Italy and Germany where he did many etchings with aquatint, mostly architectural in their subject matter. During this period he exhibited at the Royal Academy, the Royal Scottish Academy and the Royal Society of Painter-Etchers and Engravers. His etching plates were destroyed in Milan by a bomb in 1944. He returned to England during the Second World War and produced several large canvasses of London in the Blitz.

Barry moved to Jersey in about 1949, the year his father died and he inherited the Baronetcy. In Jersey he lived mostly in small hotels and then, after his second wife died of cancer in 1957, he lived in the house of the artist Tom Skinner and his family. In Jersey Barry knew the artists Edmund Blampied, who was also an etcher, and Sir Francis Cook, who left his paintings to the Island in its own gallery. Barry was awarded bronze and silver medals for painting at the Salon des Artistes Francais in 1955 and 1956. He produced portraits of Joan Collins, Margot Fonteyn, and the artist Misomé Peile, as well as many paintings of voluptuous nudes.

In the early 1960s Barry arranged an exhibition in a gallery in Jersey but sold nothing, as the local public were not interested in his work. In 1968, aged 85 years and infirm, he moved to England to live in a nursing home near to his son in Kent. He died in 1970 aged 87.

== Artistic style ==
Barry was influenced by Frank Brangwyn, who used broad blocks of colours to show light and shade. Barry claimed that Brangywn taught him to reduce his palette of colours to seven tones, four of light and three of shadow. Barry developed a Pointillist style, made famous in the late 19th century by Georges Seurat, and applied bright contrasting oil colours to create forms and shades, or used large flat blocks of a few complementary colours to create shapes and contrasts on large canvasses. He often designed aquatints of the same scenes that he depicted in oils.

== Personal life ==
Barry married Angela Doris Manners Hume-Spry (1884–1960) in 1908. They had three children: a son, Rupert Rodney Francis Tress Barry (1910–1977) who became the 4th Baronet, and two daughters, Kathleen (1909–1994) and Sheila (1915–2004). Barry abandoned his wife and family in 1922 and they divorced in 1927. Barry immediately remarried Violet Gwendoline Pretyman Darby; she died in 1957. They had no children. Barry also had a long affair in the 1950s with Doreen Durrell, the wife of a doctor in Jersey, whom he drew and painted in portrait many times.

Preceded by Edward Arthur Barry	Baronet (of St Leonard's Hill and Keiss Castle); 1949–1970	Succeeded by Rupert Rodney Barry
