= Dave Barry (Australian footballer) =

Australian rules footballer

Personal information
- Full name: David Barry
- Born: 31 August 1888; South Melbourne, Victoria
- Died: 22 July 1913 (aged 24); North Fremantle
- Original team: Leopold

Playing career^{1}
Years	Club	Games (Goals)
1909–1910	South Melbourne	24 (3)
1911–1912	Subiaco	21 (-)
1913	North Fremantle	8 (-)
- ^{1} Playing statistics correct to the end of 1913.

Dave Barry (31 August 1888 – 22 July 1913) was an Australian rules footballer who played with South Melbourne in the Victorian Football League (VFL).

Barry, who came from local club Leopold, had a brief but successful career at South Melbourne. He was one of South Melbourne's half forward flankers in their 1909 premiership team. In 1910, his only other season, he appeared in a semi final and preliminary final.

After he moved to Western Australia, Barry began playing for Subiaco. He then joined the North Fremantle Football Club for the 1913 season. On the evening of 22 July that year, Barry was killed when he was run over by a train at a railway crossing. An inquiry cleared the train driver of any blame and was unable to determine what Barry was doing on the tracks.
