= Sékoumar Barry =

Guinean filmmaker and screenwriter

- Born: 1935 (age 90–91); Forécariah, Guinea
- Occupations: Film director, filmmaker, screenwriter
- Writing career
- Language: French
- Notable work: film Et Vint la Liberté (1969)

Sékoumar Barry (also Sékou Oumar Barry, born in 1935) is a Guinean film director and screenwriter who studied filmmaking in France and in former Yugoslavia and in 2024 is living in Conakry.

Barry studied film in France with a scholarship, when at home in Guinea the 1958 Guinean constitutional referendum rejected De Gaulle's proposal for a French-African communauté (commonwealth) instead of national independence. Barry's French scholarship was revoked, but after his return to Guinea the new president Sékou Touré wanted him and others to continue studying filmmaking abroad, Barry in former Yugoslavia.

Back in Conakry, the young film directors became civil servants with the state film production and distribution company Syli Cinéma. After making short documentaries on rice cultivation (Grenier à riz, translation: Granary) and sanitation (L'Assainissement), the government in 1968 enabled Barry to create the nationalist film Et vint la liberté (And freedom came) celebrating the ten-year jubilee of Guinean independence. Touré's regime was based on terror, locking up thousands after the botched coup attempt of 1970, most of them in the concentration camp Boiro. Barry and other filmmakers were arrested and tortured, but he was released after eight months.

== Filmography ==
Barry's films include:

| Year | Film | Genre | Role | Duration (min) |
|---|---|---|---|---|
| 1965 | Assainissement (L') (translated title: Sanitation) | Documentary | Director | 30 m |
| 1966 | Mory le crabe (Crab Mory) | Comedy about jealousy | Director | 40 m |
| 1968 | Et vint la liberté (And freedom came) | Documentary on the independence of Guinea, starring Ahmed Sékou Touré. Black and white | Director and screenwriter | 45 m/ 90 min |
