= Koumbou Boly Barry =

Burkinabe woman politician

Koumbou Boly Barry is a Burkinabe politician who served as a Minister of Education and Literacy of Burkina Faso. She is the United Nations Special Rapporteur on the right to education since 2016.

Boly Barry obtained her doctorate in economic history from Cheikh Anta Diop University in Dakar, Senegal. She was the minister in the cabinet of Luc-Adolphe Tiao.
