= William fitz Robert Barry =

William fitz Robert Barry (fl. 1615) was an Irish harper. His full name was William fitz Robert fitz Edmond Barry, that is, William son of Robert son of Edmond Barry. He was a blind harper in the service of David de Barry, 5th Viscount Buttevant (died 1617), the same person who "had been commissioned by Queen Elizabeth to exterminate the harpers."

== See also ==
- Margaret Barry
- Gearóid de Barra
- Cormac de Barra
