= Bill Barry =

Australian rules footballer

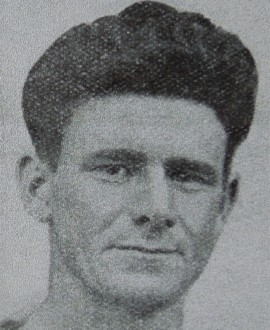
- Barry in 1925

Personal information
- Full name: William Roy Naughton Barry
- Born: 7 February 1899; Richmond, Victoria
- Died: 12 December 1955 (aged 56); Heidelberg, Victoria
- Original team: Yarraville
- Height: 183 cm (6 ft 0 in)
- Weight: 82 kg (181 lb)

Playing career^{1}
Years	Club	Games (Goals)
1925	Collingwood	4 (0)
- ^{1} Playing statistics correct to the end of 1925.

William Roy Naughton Barry (7 February 1899 – 12 December 1955) was an Australian rules footballer who played with Collingwood in the Victorian Football League (VFL).
