= Kevin Barry (footballer) =

English footballer

Personal information
- Full name: Kevin Thomas Barry
- Date of birth: 9 January 1961
- Place of birth: Newcastle upon Tyne, England
- Height: 5 ft 10 in (1.78 m)
- Position: Goalkeeper

Youth career
- –: Nottingham Forest

Senior career*
Years	Team	Apps	(Gls)
1979–1981	Darlington	18	(0)
–	Ashington		
- * Club domestic league appearances and goals

Kevin Thomas Barry (born 9 January 1961) is an English former footballer who made 18 appearances in the Football League playing as a goalkeeper for Darlington. He was on the books of Nottingham Forest without representing then in the league, and played non-league football for Ashington.
