= Peter H. Barry =

American geochemist

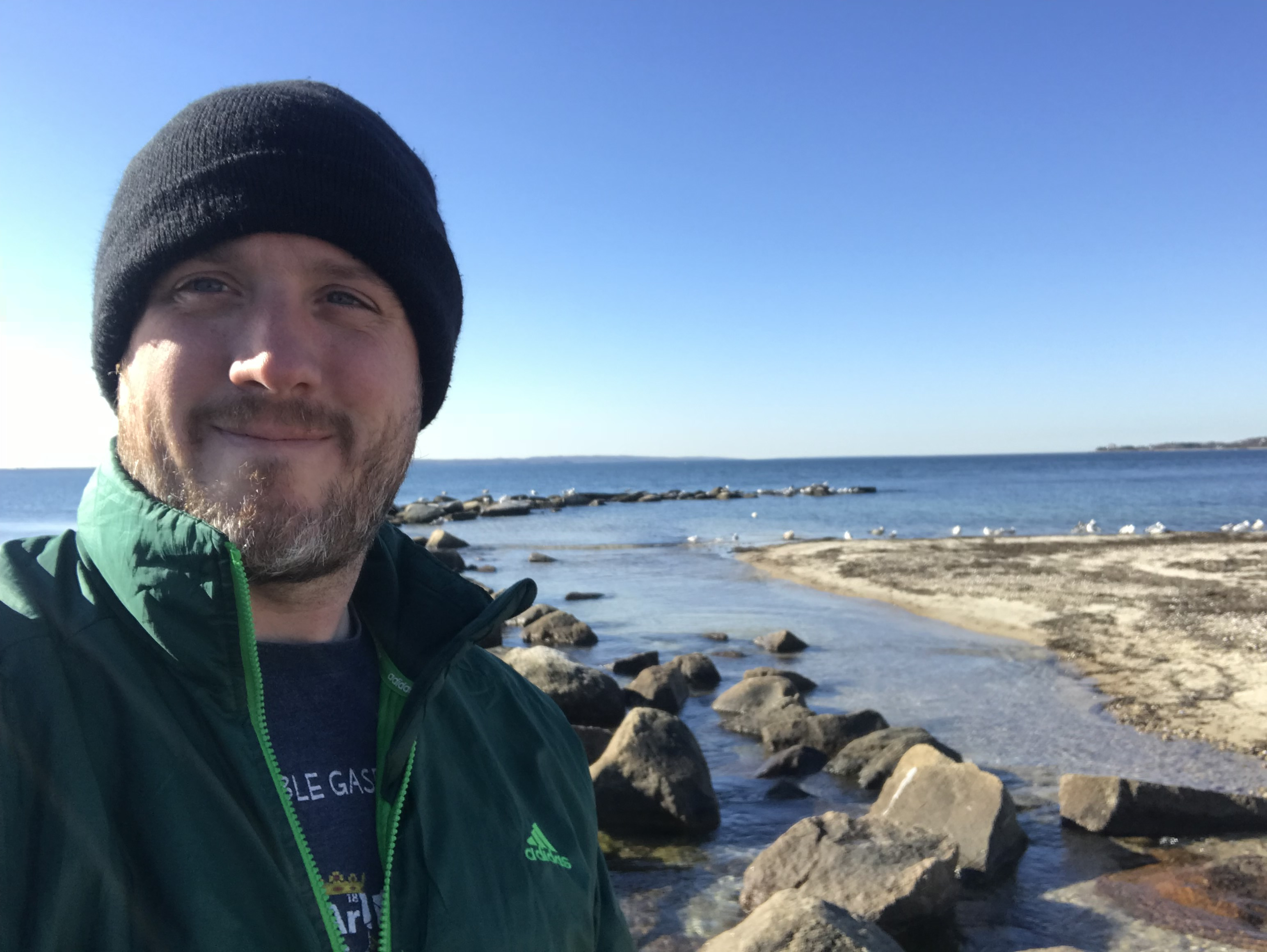
- Barry in Cape Cod, MA, USA
- Education: Scripps Institution of Oceanography
- Scientific career
- Fields: Geochemistry
- Workplaces: Woods Hole Oceanographic Institution
- Doctoral advisor: David Hilton
- Website: https://www2.whoi.edu/staff/pbarry/pete-barry-2/

Peter H. Barry is an American geochemist who is an associate scientist in the marine chemistry and geochemistry department at the Woods Hole Oceanographic Institution. He uses noble gases and stable isotopes to understand the volatile history and chemical evolution of Earth, including the dynamic processes of subduction, mantle convection and surface volcanism, which control the redistribution of chemical constituents between the crust and mantle reservoirs. Barry’s main research focus has been on high-temperature geochemistry, crust-mantle interactions and the behavior of volatile fluids in the lithosphere. He also studies crustal systems, the origin of high helium deposits, including hydrocarbon formation and transport mechanisms.

Barry earned his bachelor's degree in 2004 from SUNY Geneseo, where he studied geology. He earned his master's degree in 2011 and PhD in 2012 from Scripps Institution of Oceanography. He was an NSF Postdoctoral Fellow at University of Tennessee and continued his postdoctoral research at the University of Oxford during 2014–2018 before becoming an assistant scientist at the Woods Hole Oceanographic Institution in 2019. In 2018, he won the DCO Emerging Leader Award from the Deep Carbon Observatory (DCO) and Alfred P. Sloan Foundation in part for leading the Biology Meet Subduction project. The short science documentary produced within the framework of the project was awarded the first place price at the Goldschmidt Orbit Science Documentary Festival.

Barry's major contributions to science to date include explaining the End-Permian Extinction event, the distribution of major reservoirs of helium gas on Earth and discovering new sinks of CO_{2} in subduction zones. Several of his discoveries have been covered by international media outlets.
