= William R. Barry =

American businessman and advocate for the deaf

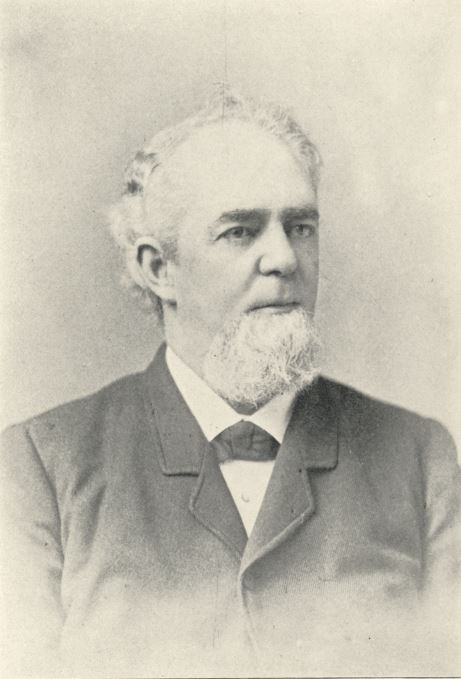
- Born: June 28, 1828; Baltimore, Maryland, U.S.
- Died: August 12, 1900 (aged 72); Baltimore, Maryland, U.S.
- Occupation: Businessman
- Known for: Advocacy for deaf education

William R. Barry (June 28, 1828 – August 12, 1900) was an American businessman and advocate for the deaf. Upon his death, he was described by the Baltimore Sun as "one of the best-known citizens" in the city.

== Early life and career ==
Barry was born June 28, 1828, in Baltimore, where he lived his entire life. He received his early education in Baltimore schools, having been "bred to mercantile pursuits". For some years he was the head of the firm of Barry & Cook, a large wholesale hardware company.

Barry became president of the Maryland Fire Insurance Company in approximately 1879, a position he held until his death. For a significant time, he also served as president of the Board of Insurance Underwriters. He was involved in the Salvage Corps, maintained by the underwriters.

== Involvement with deaf education and advocacy ==
Though he himself was hearing, Barry took an interest in education for the deaf that stemmed from his deaf daughter.

Barry became a member of the Board of Visitors of the Maryland School for the Deaf in 1869, the second year of its active work, and he held this position to the time of his death. From the time of his appointment Mr. Barry became a prominent factor in the work of the Board. He was early made a member of the Executive Committee and retained this position through various changes in its personnel to the end of his thirty-one years of service. He was the most important contributor to the success of the school during this era, including in its construction of suitable buildings for children's education. He was elected vice president of the board in June 1883, and on the death of Enoch Pratt was chosen president in January 1897, and was re-elected at each of the following annual meetings.

For about thirty years Barry volunteered as the city agent for the deaf, under appointment of the Mayor and Council of Baltimore. Barry was also one of the Directors of the Maryland Colored School for the Blind and the Deaf from its inception. His involvement with the deaf was so deep that he was personally acquainted with "almost all of the deaf people in Maryland".

A bust of Barry by Ernest Wise Keyser was installed at the Maryland School for the Deaf in 1904.

== Other charitable involvement and death ==
Barry was a prominent local Methodist. He was one of the founders of Chatsworth Independent Methodist Church of Baltimore, a liberal giver, and staunch supporter to the end of his life. For a long period of years he was its Sunday school superintendent.

Barry was one of the organizers of the Baltimore Society for the Prevention of Cruelty to Children, and for some time held the office of President. He was also President of the Henry Watson Children's Aid Society of Baltimore.

Barry died August 12, 1900, in Baltimore of "heart trouble".
