= Des Barry (footballer) =

Australian rules footballer (1933–2015)

Personal information
- Full name: Desmond John Barry
- Born: 12 May 1933
- Died: 5 July 2015 (aged 82)
- Original team: Albert Park
- Height: 180 cm (5 ft 11 in)
- Weight: 83 kg (183 lb)

Playing career^{1}
Years	Club	Games (Goals)
1955	South Melbourne	8 (0)
- ^{1} Playing statistics correct to the end of 1955.

Desmond John Barry (12 May 1933 – 5 July 2015) was an Australian rules footballer who played with South Melbourne in the Victorian Football League (VFL). Barry died on 5 July 2015, at the age of 82.
