= Kevin Barry (American football) =

American football player (born 1979)

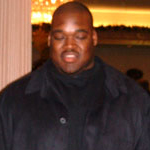

No. 71
- Position: Offensive tackle

Personal information
- Born: July 20, 1979 (age 47); Racine, Wisconsin, U.S.
- Listed height: 6 ft 4 in (1.93 m)
- Listed weight: 332 lb (151 kg)

Career information
- High school: Racine (WI) Washington Park
- College: Arizona
- NFL draft: 2002: undrafted

Career history
- Green Bay Packers (2002–2006); Houston Texans (2007); Florida Tuskers (2009)*
- * Offseason or practice squad member only

Career NFL statistics
- Games played: 59
- Games started: 8
- Stats at Pro Football Reference

Kevin Lee Barry (born July 20, 1979) is a retired American football offensive tackle. He was signed by the Green Bay Packers as an undrafted free agent in 2002. He played college football at Arizona. He is most famous for being the 6th offensive lineman in Green Bay's U-71 formation, named for Barry's uniform number.

Barry has also been a member of the Houston Texans and Florida Tuskers.

== Early life ==
Barry attended Washington Park High School and earned three varsity letters in football. Barry was a Two-Way Starter at OT, DT, and four in track & field as a shot put thrower. Barry was 1996 Racine County Player of the Year (Racine Journal Times); Wisconsin State Player of the Year (Milwaukee Journal Sentinel; All-American (USA Today). He played football for Hutchinson Community College in Hutchinson, KS. Upon graduating he joined the football team at the University of Arizona.

== Professional career ==
=== Green Bay Packers ===
Barry was signed as an undrafted free agent by the Green Bay Packers in 2002, and played there until 2006. He was released by the Packers on June 8, 2007.

=== Houston Texans ===
On July 28, 2007, he signed with the Houston Texans. Barry was waived by the Texans on December 13, 2007, without playing a game for the team.

=== Florida Tuskers ===
Barry was signed by the Florida Tuskers of the United Football League on September 9, 2009. He suffered season-ending injury to arm.
