= William Barry (Congregationalist) =

American pastor and writer

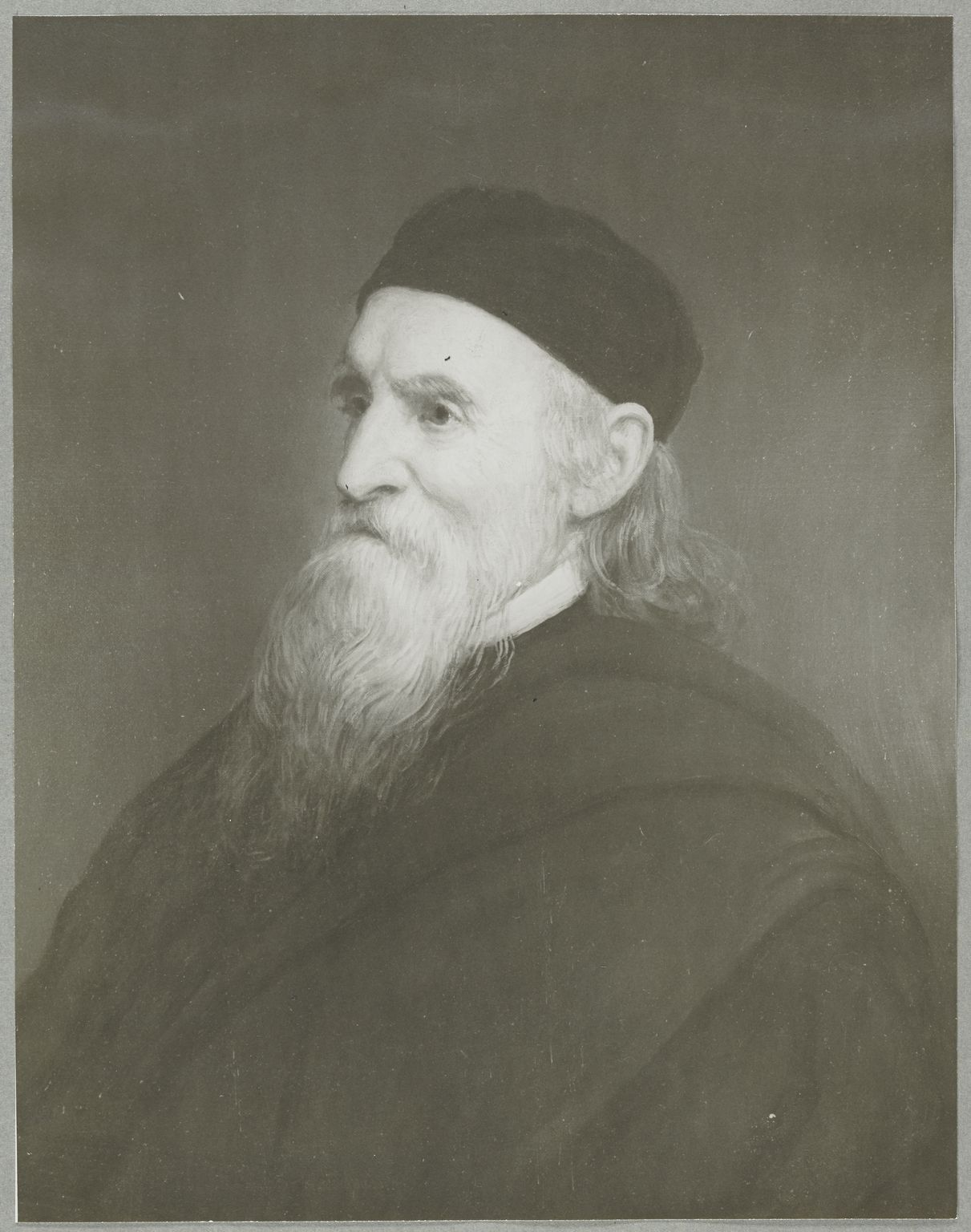
- portrait by G. P. A. Healy
- Born: January 10, 1805; Boston
- Died: January 17, 1885 (aged 80); Chicago
- Occupation: Writer, pastor, librarian
- Relatives: John Stetson Barry

William Barry (January 10, 1805 – January 17, 1885) was an American Congregationalist pastor and writer.

William Barry was born on January 10, 1805 in Boston, Massachusetts. He graduated from Brown University in 1822 and studied law, but entered Cambridge Divinity School in 1826, and after two years there spent two more in study in Gottingen and Paris. He was ordained pastor of the South Congregational Church, Lowell, Massachusetts, in 1830, and in 1835 took charge of the 1st church at Framingham. Failing health forced him to give up his charge in 1844, and he travelled in Europe and Asia until 1847, when he returned and took charge of another church in Lowell. In 1853 his health compelled him to cease work again, and he removed to Chicago, Illinois. Here he organized the Chicago Historical Society in 1856, and was its secretary and librarian until 1868. Barry was one of the most accomplished scholars and ablest writers in the west. It was in his office that President Abraham Lincoln obtained the data for his memorable address at the Cooper Institute in New York. Among his publications are Rights and Duties of Neighboring Churches; Thoughts on Christian Doctrine (Lowell, Mass., 1845); History of Framingham (Boston, 1847); Antiquities of Wisconsin (in Wisconsin Historical Collections, vol. iii.); and Letters from the East. William Barry died on 17 January 1885 in Chicago.
