= William J. Barry =

Irish Phonetician

- Born: 1943 (age 82–83); Ireland
- Education: University of Kiel
- Known for: Study of phonetics, speech technology
- Scientific career
- Fields: Phonetics
- Workplaces: Saarland University

William John Barry (born 1943 in Ireland) is a phonetician in Germany.

== Academic life ==
He moved to Germany in his early years and was mainly educated at the University of Kiel by the German phonetician Klaus J. Kohler. In 1992, he was appointed to the Chair of Phonetics at Saarland University. His principal research areas were speech synthesis, rhythm and segmental structures, the application of linguistics to questions of pronunciation learning, speech-language pathology and speech technology in general.

Barry's research and his co-operation with the Institute of Computational Linguistics at Saarland University as well as with the German Research Center for Artificial Intelligence (also Saarbruecken) led to the Saarbruecken Institute of Phonetics becoming a notable centre in its field in Europe. In 2007, Barry held the chair at the 16th International Congress of Phonetic Sciences (ICPhS). He became an emeritus professor in 2008.

Barry is currently a council member of the International Phonetic Association and editor of PHONUS journal.

== Selected works ==
Most of his publications resulted from co-operation with other researchers:

- 1979: ""Time" in the Production and Perception of Speech" (with Klaus J. Kohler)
- 1995: "Schwa vs. schwa + /r/ in German", Phonetica 52, 1995. p. 228-235
- 1996: "The relevance of phonetics for pronunciation teaching", PHONUS 2, 1996, Saarbrücken. p. 5-20
- 1996: "Some fundamental problems of looking at connected speech", Arbeitsberichte des Instituts für Phonetik und Digitale Sprachverarbeitung der Universität Kiel (AIPUK) 31, 1996. p. 113-117
- 1997: "Another R-tickle", Journal of the International Phonetic Association 27 1 & 2, 1997, 35-45
- 1998: (with J. Trouvain, C.Nielsen & O. Andersen) "Implications of energy declination for speech synthesis", Proceedings 3rd ESCA/COCOSDA Worksop on Speech Synthesis, Jenolan Caves 1998, 47-52
- 1998: "Time as a factor in the acoustic variation of schwa", Proceedings ICSLP 5, Sydney 1998, Paper 554
- 1999: "Trends und Ergebnisse der phonetischen Forschung und ihr Nutzen für den Fremdsprachenunterricht", Deutsch als Fremdsprache 36.2 1999, p. 81-87
- 1999: "Soziophonetische Betrachtungen zu deutschen Dialekten in Lothringen (Frankreich)", Folia Linguistica XXXII, 3-4, 1999, 161-199
- 2000: (with J. Trouvain) "The prosody of excitement in horse race commentaries", Proceedings ISCA Workshop on Speech and Emotion: A Conceptual Framework for Research, September 5–7, 2000. p. 86-91, Belfast, Northern Ireland
- 2001: (with B. Andreeva) "Cross-language Similarities and Differences in Spontaneous Speech Patterns", Journal of the International Phonetics Association, 31.1, 2001, 51-66
- 2001: (with C. Nielsen and O. Andersen) "Must diphone synthesis be so unnatural?", Proc. Eurospeech 2001 Scandinavia, Aalborg.
- 2002: "Differential weighting of phonetic properties in cross-dialectal perception"
- 2002: (with H. Eckert) The Phonetics and Phonology of English Pronunciation (Wissenschaftlicher Verlag Trier)
- 2003: (with B. Andreeva, M. Russo, S. Dimitrova, & T. Kostadinova) "Do Rhythm Measures Tell us Anything about Language Type?", Proc. 15th International Congress of Phonetic Sciences, Barcelona 2003
- 2004: "Interaction between segmental structure and rhythm. A look at Italian dialects and regional standard Italian"
- 2004: (with M. Pützer) "Methodische Aspekte der auditiven Bewertung von Stimmqualität", Sprache Stimme Gehör 28, 2004, pp. 1–10
- 2005: Phonetic knowledge in speech technology - and phonetic knowledge from speech technology (Springer Verlag)
- 2006: (with P. Howell and D. Vinson) "Strength of British English accents in altered listening conditions", Perception and Psychophysics 68 (1) 2006, 139-153
- 2007: "Rhythm as an L2 problem: How prosodic is it?" in Jürgen Trouvain and Ulrike Gut (eds.), Non-Native Prosody. Phonetic Description and Teaching Practice Berlin, New York: Mouton de Gruyter 2007, 97-120
- 2008: (with Jürgen Trouvain) "Do we need a symbol for a central open vowel?", Journal of the International Phonetic Association 38 No. 3, 2008, 349-357.
