= Mary F. Barry =

American physician and politician (1859–1919)

Dr. Mary F. Barry (1859 – December 1919) was a physician and state legislator in Colorado. She represented Pueblo County, Colorado in the Colorado House of Representatives for one term from 1899 to 1900 and was one of the first woman lawmakers in the country. She was a "Teller Silver Republican". She was one of several women elected in Colorado on a fusion ticket.

Barry was born in Millburn, Illinois in 1859, one of eight children. Her parents were from Northeastern United States. She attended Oskosh Normal School in Wisconsin. In 1887 she received her medical degree from Northwestern University in Chicago. After medical school, she moved to Pueblo, Colorado where she practiced and served as secretary of the Pueblo County Medical Society. Running on the Teller Silver Republican ticket, she was elected to the Colorado House of Representatives becoming one the first woman lawmakers in the country. She was also a supporter of women's suffrage. She served one term from 1899 to 1900. In 1901 she moved to Honolulu, Hawaii and was appointed health examiner for schools in 1902. She later moved to Washington, D.C. where she resided for ten years. She died in Colorado Springs in December 1919.
