= Joan Barry (politician) =

American politician

Joan Barry (born May 31, 1941) is an American politician. She was elected to the Missouri House of Representatives in 1996 and was re-elected in 1998, and 2000. In 2004 she was an unsuccessful candidate for U.S. Congress losing the Democratic primary election to Russ Carnahan. Barry is also a Registered Nurse who has worked in the field of obstetrics at St. Anthony's Hospital in St. Louis County. She is married to Phil Barry, who is also a former Missouri State Representative.

Russ Carnahan filed a complaint with the Federal Elections Commission regarding the activities of the Barry campaign, and that of State Senator Jeff Smith. No penalty was imposed.
