= Kevin Barry (equestrian) =

Irish equestrian

Personal information
- Nationality: Irish
- Born: 10 November 1920; Charleville, Ireland
- Died: 25 March 2002 (aged 81); Warrensville Heights, Ohio, U.S.

Sport
- Sport: Equestrian

Kevin Gerard Barry (10 November 1920 – 25 March 2002) was an Irish equestrian. He competed in two events at the 1956 Summer Olympics.
