= Kevin Barry (playwright) =

American dramatist

Kevin Barry Collopy (born June 4, 1951) is an American playwright and novelist known for works including In Rebel Country, Distracted by the Landscape, Track & Field, A Note on the Type, and theboysroom. In Rebel Country premiered at Cincinnati's Know Tribe Theatre, which commissioned the work, in 2000 and Distracted by the Landscape debuted at Moving Arts two years prior.

He was born in New York City and is a member of the Dramatists Guild. His work has been developed and produced in close association with Moving Arts in Los Angeles, California and the Know Theatre of Cincinnati, Ohio. Track & Field toured the United Kingdom in the summer of 2012 to coincide with the London Olympics. I Shouldn’t Have Been That Sentimental, his first novel, was published in 2020 under his full name, Kevin Barry Collopy. His other novels include, Toxurbia, Flimflammery, The Swoon Hypothesis, Short Time Dead, Shopping Hungry and Show It To Me. His occasional film reviews can be found under barrywerks on Letterboxd.com.
