= Ed Barry (baseball) =

American baseball player (1882-1920)

- Pitcher
- Born: October 2, 1882; Madison, Wisconsin, U.S.
- Died: June 19, 1920 (aged 37); Montague, Massachusetts, U.S.
- Batted: Right Threw: Left

MLB debut
- August 27, 1905, for the Boston Americans

Last MLB appearance
- October 7, 1907, for the Boston Americans

MLB statistics
- Win–loss record: 1–6
- Earned run average: 3.53
- Strikeouts: 34
- Stats at Baseball Reference

Teams
- Boston Americans (1905–1907)

Edward Barry (October 2, 1882 – June 19, 1920) was an American left-handed starting pitcher in Major League Baseball who played from 1905 to 1907 with the Boston Americans. His nickname was "Jumbo".
