= Edward Barry (cricketer) =

English/Irish cricketer (1898–1965)

Cricket information
- Batting: Left-handed
- Bowling: Left-arm medium

International information
- National side: Ireland

Career statistics
Competition	First-class
Matches	2
Runs scored	20
Batting average	10.00
100s/50s	0/0
Top score	15
Balls bowled	144
Wickets	1
Bowling average	70.00
5 wickets in innings	0
10 wickets in match	0
Best bowling	1/44
Catches/stumpings	1/0
- Source: CricketArchive, 16 August 2022

Edward Albert Barry (8 June 1898 – 24 November 1965) was an English cricketer. A left-handed batsman and left-arm medium pace bowler, he played two first-class matches for Ireland in the summer of 1926, against Oxford University and Scotland. He did not play for Ireland again.
