= J. Edward Barry =

American politician (1874–1932)

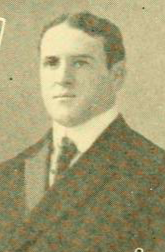

J. Edward Barry (1874–1932) was mayor of Cambridge, Massachusetts from 1911 to 1914. He graduated from St. Thomas Aquinas College, and worked in the railroad business before entering politics. He served on the lower body of City Council from 1900 to 1902, and he was a member of the Massachusetts House of Representatives in 1906. He became mayor in 1911, and he was elected president of the Association of Railroad and Steamship Agents in 1912.
