= Edward Barry (writer) =

English writer

Edward Barry (1759–1822) was an English writer who mainly wrote on religious and medical topics. During his lifetime he was considered one of the most popular preachers in London, and has published papers and books on multiple topics. The most notable was Friendly Call to a New Species of Dissenters, which was published multiple times.

== Life and career ==
Barry, the son of a Bristol physician, was educated at Bristol Grammar School under Charles Lee, and studied medicine at St Andrews University graduating with an M.D.. Preferring theology to physic, he took orders in the Church of England. For several years he was the curate of St Marylebone, and one of the most popular preachers in London. It is said that the ordinary of Newgate, Mr. Villette, often availed himself of Dr. Barry's assistance in awakening the consciences of hardened criminals.

He retired to Reading after living in London the majority of his adult life. He employed himself, preparing some of his works for the press, the most noted being a Friendly Call to a New Species of Dissenters, which went through several editions. He dedicated it to Sir William Scott, afterwards Lord Stowell, whose interest with his younger brother, Lord Eldon, then lord chancellor, obtained for Barry the two livings of St Mary and St Leonard in Wallingford, Oxfordshire.

== Personal ==
He was grand chaplain to the Freemasons. On one occasion he was presented with a gold medal for a sermon delivered to them, they later requested the rights to publicize the sermon. The immense concourse of persons at his funeral attested the esteem in which he was held at Wallingford. He was twice married. Dr. Barry belonged to the old school of high churchmen.

== Publications ==
Besides the works mentioned above, he published:

- Theological, Philosophical, and Moral Essays, 1791
- Works in 3 volumes, 1806
- The Aesculapian Monitor; or, Faithful Guide to the History of the Human Species, and Most Important Branches of Medical Philosophy, 1811
- several sermons, one preached to convicts under sentence of death in Newgate, and one on bull-baiting
- several letters, one to king, lords, and commons, on the practice of boxing
- some political tracts

A work in four volumes, published under his name in 1791, The Present Practice of a Justice of the Peace, and a Complete Library of Parish Law, is said not to have been compiled by Barry.
