= Desmond Barry =

British writer

Desmond Barry (born 1954) is a Welsh novelist, short story writer, essay writer and performance artist.

== Life ==
Barry was born in Merthyr Tydfil and raised on the town's Gurnos estate. From 1972-75, he studied History at University College London. After his degree, he taught English in Italy. In 1986 he moved to the USA. In 1988, he wrote and performed Durante' s Interno, at Life on the Water Theater, San Francisco, during National Poetry Week. In 1994 he began a MFA in Creative Writing at Columbia University. While there, he studied under Booker Prize–winner Peter Carey, and won a Mellon Foundation grant to work as Carey’s researcher on his novel Jack Maggs.

To make ends meet he worked in the construction sector in San Francisco and New York City. From 1999 to 2001, in the summer months, Barry worked in Tibet as project coordinator for ASIA.NGO an aid organisation registered in Italy.

Barry's debut novel, The Chivalry of Crime (Little, Brown & Co, 2000; Jonathan Cape, 2001), was awarded Best First Novel of the American West by the Western Writers of America. His second novel, A Bloody Good Friday (Jonathan Cape, 2002) is set in his home town in 1977. Cressida’s Bed (Jonathan Cape, 2004) is set in India and Bhutan in 1931.

Under the heteronym, David Enrique Spellman (DES) he wrote and coordinated the multi-platform noir novel Far South (Serpent's Tail, 2011) that included web-based short films and a graphic novella. He won a £20,000 Creative Wales Award in 2006 for the Far South Project, which is ongoing.

His shorter prose has appeared in Granta (89, The Factory Issue,Spring 2005), The New Yorker (Money Issue, April 23&30, 2001), The Big Issue and in the anthologies Wales, Half Welsh (Bloomsbury, 2004), London Noir (Serpent’s Tail, 2006) and Sea Stories (National Maritime Museum, 2007). His play Jetlag was the Cardiff part of Three Cities, a trilogy of plays written in collaboration with writers from Buenos Aires and Melbourne and performed in Cardiff in 2007 at Chapter Arts Centre. Funded by Wales Arts International, Barry worked with Uruguayan photographer, Diego Vidart to produce 'The Falkland Diaries, an exhibition at the Wales Millennium Centre in 2007 for the 25th anniversary of the Falkland Wars.

Since 2015, he has been training in the Japanese performance art of Butoh (Dance of Darkness). His short film Temple Lament, (https://vimeo.com/1037315566), a Butoh response to the catastrophic bushfires on Mount Cole in Victoria, was selected for the Melbourne Documentary Film Festival 2025.

== Selected publications ==
The Chivalry of Crime (Little, Brown and Company, 2000) ISBN 978-0-316-12038-8 (Jonathan Cape, 2001) ISBN 978-0-224-06062-2
A Bloody Good Friday (Jonathan Cape, 2002) ISBN 978-0-224-06201-5
Cressida’s Bed (Jonathan Cape, 2004) ISBN 978-0-224-07348-6

Far South (Serpent’s Tail, 2011) ISBN 978-1-84668-810-2 under the heteronym David Enrique Spellman

Contributed to:
Wales, Half Welsh (Bloomsbury, 2004) ISBN 978-0-7475-6606-9
London Noir (Akashic Books, 2006) ISBN 978-1-888451-98-6 : (Serpent’s Tail, 2006) ISBN 978-1-85242-930-0
Sea Stories (National Maritime Museum, 2007)
Merthyr Writing! (Merthyr Tydfil County Borough Council, 2008)

Nonfiction
3:AM Magazine
The Circular Church (or books, guns and the report on the blind) Words by Des Barry; Photography by Diego Vidart http://www.3ammagazine.com/3am/the-circular-church-or-books-guns-and-the-report-on-the-blind/
The Sauna King. Words by Des Barry; Photography by Kristian Helgesen http://www.3ammagazine.com/3am/the-sauna-king/
William Burroughs and the Dreamscapes of the Dalai Lama http://www.3ammagazine.com/3am/william-burroughs-and-the-dreamscapes-of-the-dalai-lama/
