= William Francis Barry =

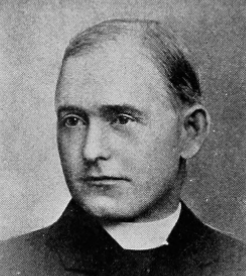
- Born: 21 April 1849; London, England, UK
- Died: 15 December 1930 (aged 81); Oxford, England, UK
- Occupations: Catholic priest, theologian, educator, writer, lecturer
- Writing career
- Genres: Fiction, religious fiction, romance fiction, non-fiction, satire, essay, philosophical literature, social commentary

William Francis Barry (21 April 1849 – 15 December 1930) was a British Catholic priest, theologian, educator and writer. He served as vice president and professor of philosophy at Birmingham Theological College from 1873 to 1877 and then professor of divinity at Oscott College from 1877 to 1880. A distinguished ecclesiastic, Barry gave lectures in both Great Britain and the United States during the 1890s. He was also a popular author and novelist at the start of the 20th century, whose books usually dealt with then controversial religious and social questions, and is credited as the creator of the modern English Catholic novel.

== Biography ==
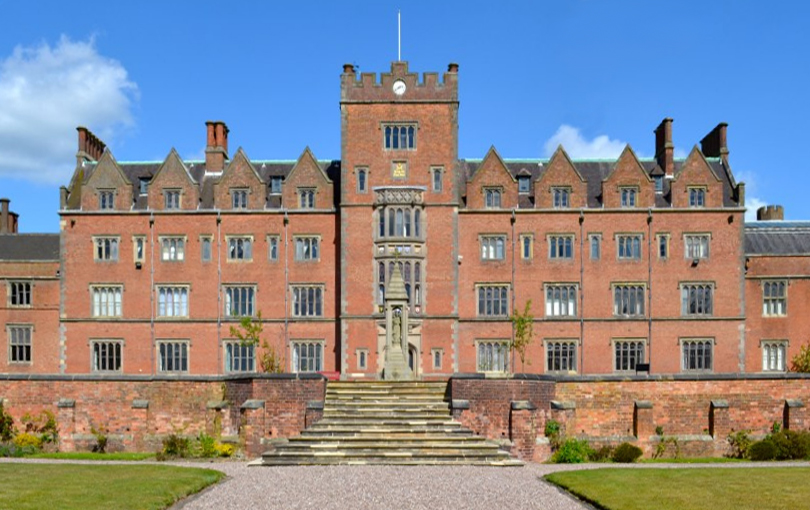
Oscott College

William Francis Barry was born in London, England, to Irish Catholic parents (from Liscarroll, Co. Cork) on 21 April 1849. He was educated at Hammersmith Training School, Sedgeley Park School and Oscott College prior to attending the English College and the Gregorian University in Rome in 1868. Barry was seventh in honors at his matriculation at London University, and a scholar of the English College de Urbe. He also became exceptionally knowledgeable in French, German, Italian, Spanish, Gaelic, Greek, and Latin languages and literature.

He studied under Cardinals Johann Baptist Franzelin, Camillo Tarquini, and Perrone while at the university, received a BC and DD and was present during the First Vatican Council and taking of Rome in 1870. In 1873, he was ordained as a Catholic priest at St. John Lateran and returned to England to teach philosophy and religious history at Birmingham (or Olton) Theological College. He also served as its vice president from 1873 to 1877 before moving on to his old alma mater as a professor of divinity at Oscott College until 1880. Three years later, Barry moved to Dorchester-on-Thames in Oxfordshire where he remained a longtime resident for over 20 years. A year or two after arriving in England, Bary also became a regular contributor to the Dublin Review and later the Contemporary Review, the Edinburgh Review, and the Nineteenth Century; he published around 70 essays in various periodicals during his lifetime. In the 1890s he was a friend of Count Stenbock, Lionel Johnson and Robert Ross. (see W.B. Yeats letters, vol.2).

Barry began traveling the country, first going on mission in Wolverhampton in 1883, delivered addresses in the United States in 1893, and lectured at the Royal Institution as well as in many parts of England. In 1897, he delivered a centenary address on Burke in both London and Dublin. By the start of the 20th century, he had also published a number of popular religious and romance novels. In many of these, the themes of these books often touched upon controversial religious and social questions of the period. His first novel, The New Antigone (1887), included concepts involving socialism, atheism, freethought, sexual openness, and rights for women. In later novels, such as Arden Massiter (1900), a youthful English socialist becomes entangled in Italian revolutionary politics, while The Wizard's Knot (1901) criticised the Celtic Revivalism. His last novel, The Dayspring (1903), depicts a young Irishman who journeys to France to live in the Paris Commune but eventually chooses to leave for America considering it to hold a truer prospect of freedom than life in the Commune.

Barry then turned to non-fiction and published a series of books on religion. These included biographies on religious figures such as Cardinal Newman and Ernest Renan, and on Catholicism in general, with his most notable works being The Papal Monarchy (1902) and Heralds of Revolt (1904). His writings about the medieval papacy were censored by his superiors. Barry also wrote a number of articles for the Catholic Encyclopedia. In 1923, he was created a Notary Apostolic by Pope Pius XI. Barry wrote his autobiography, Memories and Opinions (1926), three years later.

After living at Leamington for a time as rector of St. Peter's, he moved back to Oxford in 1928; he died there on 15 December 1930, at the age of 81.

== Bibliography ==
=== Fiction ===
- The New Antigone (1887)
- The Two Standards (1898)
- Arden Massiter (1900)
- The Wizard's Knot (1901)
- The Dayspring (1903)

=== Non-fiction ===
- The Papal Monarchy (1902)
- Newman (1904)
- Heralds of Revolt (1904)
- Ernest Renan (1905)
- The King's Highway of the Holy Cross (1905)
- The Catholic Church and Labour (1908)
- The Hygiene of the Schoolroom (1911)
- The Religion of America: To a Catholic Missionary in the United States (1913)
- The World's Debate (1917)
- Memories and Opinions (1926)
- The Triumph of Life, Or Science and the Soul (1928)
- The Papacy and Modern Times: A Political Sketch, 1303-1870 (1929)
- The Tariff (1929)
- The Coming Age and the Catholic Church: A Forecast (1929)

== Studies on William F. Barry ==
- Sheridan Gilley, 'Father William Barry: Priest and Novelist'. In Recusant History, vol. 24, no. 4 (1999), pp. 523–551.
- J.R.Tye, 'Malleus Maleficorum: The Reverend W.F. Barry, DD, 1849-1930'. In English Literature in Transition 1880-1920, vol. 16, no. 1 (1973), pp. 43–56.
