= William Barry (footballer) =

Irish footballer

Personal information
- Date of birth: 1929
- Date of death: 26 March 2007 (aged 77–78)
- Position: Midfielder

Senior career*
Years	Team	Apps	(Gls)
- Waterford United

International career
1948	Republic of Ireland	1	(0)
- * Club domestic league appearances and goals

William Barry (1929 – 26 March 2007) was an Irish footballer. He competed in the men's tournament at the 1948 Summer Olympics.
