= Bari (disambiguation) =

Bari is the second largest continental city of southern Italy.

Bari may also refer to:

== Languages ==
- Bari dialect, a dialect of Neapolitan spoken in the Apulia and Basilicata regions of Italy
- Bari language, spoken in South Sudan, Uganda, and Democratic Republic of Congo
- Bari language (Ubangian), a Ubangian language of South Sudan
- Barí language a Chibchan language of Colombia and Venezuela

== Places ==
=== India ===
- Bari (Odisha Vidhan Sabha constituency), in Jajpur, Odisha
- Bari, Himachal Pradesh
- Bari, India, Rajasthan
- Jorasanko Thakur Bari, the ancestral home of the Tagore family, West Bengal
- Bari, Raebareli, a village in Uttar Pradesh, India
- Bari Assembly constituency (disambiguation)

=== Iran ===
- Bari, West Azerbaijan
- Bari, East Azerbaijan
- Bari, Zanjan
- Bari, Iran (disambiguation)

=== Italy ===
- Bari Sardo, Sardinia, Italy
- Metropolitan City of Bari, Italy
- Mola di Bari, Bari, Apulia, Italy
- Province of Bari, Apulia, Italy
- Sammichele di Bari, Bari, Apulia, Italy

=== Other places ===
- Bari, Kano State, Nigeria
- Aima Bari, Jhelum, Pakistan
- Bari, Somalia, northern Somalia

== People ==
- Bari (name)
- ASAP Bari (born 1991), nickname of Jabari Shelton, an American streetwear designer

=== Ethnic groups ===
- Barí people, an indigenous group of Colombia and Venezuela referred to in Spanish as "Motilón"
- Bari people, an ethnic group in South Sudan
  - Bari language, their language
- Bari (caste), a Hindu caste in India
- Bari tribes of Pakistan

=== Nobility ===
- Grimoald, Prince of Bari, the prince of Bari from 1121 to 1132
- Jaquintus, Prince of Bari (died 1139), prince of Bari from 1138 to 1139
- Tancred, Prince of Bari (born 1119), prince of Bari and Taranto from 1132 to 1138

== Music ==
- Bari, a Caribbean drum (also music genre and dance) found in Bonaire and Curaçao
- Barí, a 2002 album by the group Ojos de Brujo
- Abbreviation of Baritone, a mid to low range voice type
  - Baritone horn
  - Baritone saxophone, often abbreviated to "bari sax"

== Sports ==
- Bari Grand Prix, a road race held in Bari, Italy
- London Bari F.C., a football team in England
- SSC Bari, a football club located in Bari, Italy

== Other ==
- Emirate of Bari
- 47th Infantry Division Bari, an Italian infantry division of World War II
- Barbari goat or bari goat
- Bari Airport, Bari, Italy
- Fath al-Bari, a Sunni commentary of Sahih Bukhari
- University of Bari a university located in Bari, Italy
- al-Bari', one of the names of God in Islam
- Princess Bari, a figure in Korean mythology
- Bari, a creature from The Legend of Zelda universe

== See also ==
- Bari Bari Densetsu, motorbike racing manga series
- Baree (disambiguation)
- Bary (disambiguation)
- Badi (disambiguation)
- Heinrich Anton de Bary (1831–1888), German surgeon and biologist
