= Bari (surname) =

Bari is a surname, and may refer to:

- Abdul Bari (professor) (1892–1947), Indian freedom activist, academic and social reformer
- Abdul Bari (squash player), Indian squash player
- Abdul Bari (Taliban commander, Helmand), mullah and alleged Taliban commander
- Abdul Bari (Taliban commander, Uruzgan) (died 2009), mullah and alleged Taliban commander
- Abdul Aziz Bari (born 1959), Malaysian politician and academic
- Abdul Majeed Abdul Bari (1963–2018), Maldivian politician and Islamic scholar
- Adel Abdel Bari (born 1960), Egyptian terrorist
- Alexander Bari (1847–1913), Russian and American engineer and entrepreneur
- Amina Bari, Bangladeshi politician
- Andrea Bari (born 1980), Italian volleyball player
- Bilal Bari (born 1998), French footballer
- Syed Emdadul Bari (1935–2020), Bangladeshi lawyer, freedom fighter and politician
- Enamul Bari, Chief of Air Staff of the Bangladesh Air Force
- Eugen Bari (born 1971), Slovak football player and manager
- Farrukh Bari (born 1964), Pakistani cricketer
- Farzana Bari (born 1957), Pakistani feminist, human rights activist and academic
- Begum Feroza Bari (1917–1982), Bangladeshi social worker and female leader
- Gwen Bari (1918–2000), American jazz singer
- Inam Bari, Pakistani politician
- Judi Bari (1949–1997), American environmentalist, feminist and labor leader
- Komalika Bari (born 2002), Indian archer
- Kristián Bari (born 2001), Slovak footballer
- Laura Bari, Argentinian-Canadian filmmaker
- Lisa Bari, American health policy strategist and consultant
- Lynn Bari (1919–1989), American film actress
- M. A. Bari (Khulna-6 politician), Bangladeshi politician from the Bagerhat District
- M. A. Bari (Sherpur-3 politician), Bangladeshi Awami League politician
- M. Ershadul Bari (born 1952), Bangladeshi academic
- Manasa Bari (born 1974), Fijian rugby union footballer and coach
- Mian Abdul Bari (1895–1968), Pakistani politician
- Muhammad Abdul Bari (born 1953), Bangladeshi-British physicist, writer and community leader
- Muhammad Abdul Bari (academic) (1930–2003), Bangladeshi academic, linguist and Islamic scholar
- Muhammad Emdad-Ul-Bari (born 1965), Bangladesh Army officer and telecoms executive
- Nazmi Bari (1929–2008), Turkish tennis player
- Nina Bari (1901–1961), Russian mathematician
- Omar Bari (born 1986), Guinean football goalkeeper
- Regina Bari-Nagy (born 1990), Hungarian handballer
- Ruth Aaronson Bari (1917–2005), American mathematician
- S. A. Bari (1927–1987), Bangladeshi politician
- Shahidha Bari (born 1980), British academic, critic and broadcaster
- Shamsul Bari, Bangladeshi human rights activist, lawyer and diplomat
- Syed Shamsul Bari, Indian lawyer and politician from West Bengal
- Wasim Bari (born 1948), Pakistani cricketer
- Wasim Bari (Emirati cricketer) (born 1988), Emirati cricketer

== See also ==
- Fazlul Bari
- Di Bari
- Barri (surname)
- Bary
