= Baree =

Baree may refer to:

- Bare'e language, an alternative name for the Pamona language
- Bare'e people, an alternative name for the Pamona people
- Baree, Queensland, a locality in Australia
- Baree, Son of Kazan, a 1917 American novel by James Oliver Curwood later adapted into Baree, Son of Kazan (1918) and Baree, Son of Kazan (1925)

== See also ==
- Bari (disambiguation)
- Bary (disambiguation)
