= Bary =

Bary is a surname, and may refer to:

- René Bary, 17th century French historiographer and rhetorician
- Hendrik Bary (c.1632 – 1707), Dutch engraver
- Léon Bary (1880–1954), French actor
- Helen Valeska Bary (1888–1973), American suffragist
- Pascal Bary (born 1953), French racehorse trainer

== See also ==
- Bary Glacier, Jacobsen Bight, South Georgia
- Bary, Iran (disambiguation), places in Iran
- De Bary (disambiguation)
- Baree (disambiguation)
- Bari (disambiguation)
