= Abd al-Bari =

Abd al-Bari (Arabic: عبد الباري) is a male given name using the words Abd, al- and Bari, the name means Servant of the Creator. The name is subject to variable spacing, spelling, and hyphenation.

It may refer to:

- Abdul Bari Firangi Mahali (1878–1926), Indian author and pan-Islamist
- Abdul Bari Nadvi (1886–1976), Indian author and educationalist
- Abdulbari ath-Thubaity, Imam and Khatib of Masjid an-Nabawi
- Abdul Bari (professor) (1892–1947), Indian freedom fighter, politician and union leader
- Muhammad Abdul Bari (academic) (1930–2003), Vice-Chancellor of Rajshahi University and the Chairman of University Grants Commission
- Abdul Bari (squash player) (died 1954), Indian squash player
- Abdel Bari Atwan (born 1950), Palestinian-British journalist
- Muhammad Abdul Bari (born 1953), Bangladeshi-British Muslim author and community leader
- Adel Abdel Bari (born 1960), Egyptian Islamic militant
- Abdul Bari (Taliban commander, Helmand)
- Abdul Bari (Taliban commander, Uruzgan)
- Abdul Bari (Guantanamo captive 753)
- Md. Abdul Bari Sarder, Bangladeshi politician
- Md Abdul Bari, Bangladeshi politician

== See also ==
- Bari (name)
