= List of Initial D chapters =

The cover of the first Initial D tankōbon, released in Japan by Kodansha on November 6, 1995.

This is a list of chapters for the manga series Initial D written by Shuichi Shigeno and serialized in Young Magazine. The first chapter appeared in the 1995 issue and the series ended in 2013, with seven hundred and nineteen chapters published as of 2013. The anime adaptation based on the manga is being produced by Studio Gallop and Pastel and aired on Fuji Television and Animax. The First Stage premiered on April 18, 1998, with 26 episodes aired. The Second Stage premiered on October 14, 1999, with 13 episodes aired. The Fourth Stage premiered on April 17, 2004, with 24 episodes aired. In addition, an animated movie ("Third Stage") and five OVAs ("Extra Stage" with two episodes, "Battle Stage", "Battle Stage 2" and "Battle Stage 3") based on the manga have been produced.

Seven hundred and nineteen chapters have been collected into forty-eight tankōbon and published in Japan by Kodansha. The first tankōbon was released on November 6, 1995, and the forty-eight was released on November 6, 2013.

In North America, Initial D was licensed by Tokyopop, who have released thirty-three volumes. The first volume was released in May 2002, with the thirty-third released on January 13, 2009. On April 17, 2019, ComiXology and Kodansha Comics released volumes 1–38 digitally, marking the availability of volumes 34–38 in English for the first time. On July 20, 2019, ComiXology and Kodansha Comics released the remaining volumes 39–48 digitally.

== Volumes ==
=== Part 1: Akina's Eight-Six ===
No.	Original release date	Original ISBN	English release date	English ISBN
1	November 6, 1995	4-06-323567-X	May 21, 2002	978-1-931514-98-9
001. "Let's Buy an Eight-Six" (ハチロク買おーぜ "Hachi Roku Kaōze"); 002. "The Fastest!! The Rotary Brothers" (最速!!ロータリー・ブラザーズ "Saisoku!! Rōtarī Burazāzu!!"); 003. "Ultimate Toofu-vendor Drift!" (究極のとうふ屋ドリフト "Kyūkyoku no Tōfu Ya Dorifuto"); 004. "Iketani's Touching Determination!!" (池谷の悲壮な決意!! "Iketani no Hisō na Ketsui!!"); 005. "Declaration of Revenge!! Roaring 13B Turbo!" (リベンジ宣言!!吠える13Bターボ "Ribenji Sengen!! Hoeru 13B Tābo"); 006. "Natsuki's Secret..!?" (なつきの秘密・・!? "Natsuki no Himitsu..!?"); 007. "Oh no! Iketani Crashes" (無残!池谷クラッシュ!! "Muzan! Iketani Kurasshu!!"); 008. "The Battle Begins" (交流戦突入!! "Kōryū sen Totsunyū!!"); 009. "Hear!! The roar of the 4A-G!" (聞け!!4A-Gの雄叫びを "Kike!! 4A-G no Otakebi wo"); 010. "Downhill Specialist" (ダウンヒルスペシャリスト "Daunhiru Supesharisuto")
Trueno AE86 vs RX-7 FD3S (unofficial)
2	February 6, 1996	4-06-323583-1	July 16, 2002	978-1-59182-035-2
011. "Takumi!! Lightning Speed!" (拓海!!電光石火 "Takumi!! Denkōsekka"); 012. "Dogfight!" (ドッグファイト "Doggufaito"); 013. "Conclusion!! Takumi's Special Technique!" (決着!!拓海の得意技 "Ketchaku!! Takumi no Tokui Waza"); 014. "The Ocean is So Big and Wide" (海は広いね大きいね "Umi ha Hiroi ne Ōkī ne"); 015. "Showdown at the Peak!!" (頂上対決!! "Chōjō Taiketsu!!"); 016. "Iketani's Valuable Experience" (池谷の貴重な体験 "Iketani no Kichō na Taiken"); 017. "A New Challenger!!" (新たなる挑戦者!! "Arata Naru Chōsen Sha!!"); 018. "Takumi's Pride" (拓海のプライド "Takumi no Puraido"); 019. "I'm Not Afraid of No GT-R!!" (オレはGT-Rなんざ怖くねぇ "Ore ha GT-R Nanza Kowaku nē"); 020. "Give the Eight-Six Back, You Stupid Old Man!!" (バカおやじハチロク返せ!! "Baka Oyaji Hachi Roku Kaese!!"); 021. "The GT-R's Weak Spot" (GT-Rの弱点 "GT-R no Jakuten")
Trueno AE86 vs RX-7 FD3S
3	May 8, 1996	4-06-323598-X	October 22, 2002	978-1-59182-036-9
022. "Takumi's Full Throttle Drift" (拓海の全開ドライブ "Takumi no Zenkai Doraibu"); 023. "Close in With the GT-R!!" (GT-Rを追いつめろ!! "GT-R wo Oitsumero!!"); 024. "Battle of Limits!!" (限界バトル!! "Genkai Batoru!!"); 025. "Exploding 5 Serial Hairpins!!" (爆裂5連ヘアピン!! "Bakuretsu 5 Ren Heapin!!"); 026. "Precise Control!" (限界コントロール "Genkai Kontorōru"); 027. "Itsuki's Levin Appears!!" (イツキのレビン登場 "Itsuki no Rebin Tōjō"); 028. "Friendship-power Levin Race!!" (友情パワーレビン激走!! "Yūjō Pawā Rebin Gekisō!!"); 029. "Another Downhill Specialist!" (もう一人の下り(ダウンヒル)スペシャリスト "Mō Hitori no Daunhiru Supesharisuto"); 030. "Dangerous Shingo!" (デンジャラス慎吾 "Denjarasu Shingo"); 031. "Takumi vs. Shingo!" (拓海VS. 慎吾 "Takumi VS. Shingo"); 032. "Deathmatch of Madness!" (狂気のデスマッチ "Kyōki no Desumacchi")
Trueno AE86 vs GT-R R32
4	August 6, 1996	4-06-336613-8	January 14, 2003	978-1-59182-037-6
033. "Evolutionary Genius!" (進化する天才!! "Shinka Suru Tensai!!"); 034. "Panicking Shingo!" (慎吾のあせり "Shingo no Aseri"); 035. "Counter Attack! Art of Downhill!" (反撃!!ダウンヒルの真髄 "Hangeki!! Daunhiru no Shinzui"); 036. "The Real Downhill!" (究極のダウンヒラー "Kyūkyoku no Daunhirā"); 037. "Takumi is confused again!" (そして拓海はまたボケる "Soshite Takumi ha Mata Bokeru"); 038. "Nonchalant, Bunta's Potential!" (さりげなく 文太の底力!! "Sarigenaku Bunta no Sokojikara!!"); 039. "White Comet! Ryousuke Takahashi's Start!" (白い彗星!!高橋涼介始動 "Shiroi Suisei!! Takahashi Ryōsuke Shidō"); 040. "Surprise Tuning!" (意外なチューニング "Igai na Chūningu"); 041. "Nervous! Takumi is an Idiot Around Girls!" (イライラするぜ拓海の女ボケ "Iraira Suru ze Takumi no Onna Boke"); 042. "The Night Before the Rival Competition!" (ライバル達の前夜祭!! "Raibaru Tachi no Zenyasai!!"); 043. "Forward, Takumi! Time of Fate!" (拓海発進運命の瞬間(とき)!! "Takumi Hasshin Unmei no Toki!!")
Trueno AE86 vs Civic Si-R II EG6 (unofficial) (official in anime)
5	December 6, 1996	4-06-336637-5	April 15, 2003	978-1-59182-038-3
044. "Drift vs. Drift!" (ドリフト対ドリフト "Dorifuto Tai Dorifuto"); 045. "Tak Feels the Heat" (拓海苦戦はじめてのプレッシャー "Takumi Kusen Hajimete no Puresshā"); 046. "At the Brink of Desperation" (絶体絶命 "Zettaizetsumei"); 047. "The Understter" (痛恨のアンダーステア "Tsūkon no Andāsutea"); 048. "A Miscalculation!" (涼介の誤算 "Ryōsuke no Gosan"); 049. "Ry Crosses the Line" (火花散らすラインクロス!! "Hibana Chirasu Rain Kurosu!!"); 050. "Beyond Akina" (新境地へ向けて "Shin Kyōchi He Mukete"); 051. "Even Geeks Find Love" (ホレた相手が悪いかも? "Hore ta Aite ga Warui Kamo?"); 052. "A Shadow Over Happiness" (暗雲立ちこめる避暑地の恋 "Anun Tachikomeru Hisho Chi no Koi"); 053. "Where Races Fear to Tread" (池谷 純愛まっしぐら "Iketani Junai Masshigura"); 054. "Maya Gives It Up" (真子のバージンあげます!! "Mako no Bājin Age Masu!!")
Trueno AE86 vs RX-7 FC3S
6	February 6, 1997	4-06-336650-2	June 17, 2003	978-1-59182-039-0
055. "I'll Do It" (君のためならオレはやる "Kimi no Tame Nara Ore ha Yaru"); 056. "Stranger on a Strange Hill" (未知への挑戦!! "Michi heno Chōsen!!"); 057. "Takumi Will Win, Quoth Bunta" (文太の予言 拓海は負けねえ!! "Bunta no Yogen Takumi ha Make Nē!!"); 058. "Basting Down Usui" (熱風!!激走!!碓氷峠 "Neppū!! Gekisō!! Usui Tōge"); 059. "Showcasing Talent" (魅せろ拓海のスーパードリフト!! "Misero Takumi no Sūpā Dorifuto!!"); 060. "Cheers for the Double Act" (とりもどせ最速のコンビネーション!! "Torimodose Saisoku no Konbinēshon!!"); 061. "The End" (決着 "Ketchaku"); 062. "No End!" (引退なんかしないもん!! "Intai Nanka Shinai Mon!!"); 063. "The End of Summer" (ジ·エンド·オブ·サマー "Ji.Endo.Obu.Samā"); 064. "The End of Innocence" (ジ·エンド·オブ·サマー完結編(?) "Ji.Endo.Obu.Samā Kanketsu Hen (?)"); 065. "Ry's Big Plan!" (進行するプロジェクト "Shinkō Suru Purojekuto")
Trueno AE86 vs SilEighty (private battle)
7	June 6, 1997	4-06-336670-7	August 5, 2003	978-1-59182-040-6
066. "K.T. Takahashi Has No Blind Spots" (高橋啓介に死角なし!! "Takahashi Keisuke ni Shikaku Nashi!!"); 067. "The Uphill Smackdown!" (激闘ヒルクライム!! "Gekitō Hirukuraimu!!"); 068. "The Clash of the Prides" (激突するプライド!! "Gekitotsu Suru Puraido!!"); 069. "Power vs. Technique" (驚異のハイテク戦闘機を追え!! "Kyōi no Haiteku Sentōki wo oe!!"); 070. "Art of Cornering" (そこまで曲がるかFD-3S!! "Soko Made Magaru ka FD-3S!!"); 071. "Reading the Weather" (キレる男 高橋啓介!! "Kire ru Otoko Takahashi Keisuke!!"); 072. "The Man Who Shows No Fear" (ステアリング インフォメーション "Sutearingu Infomēshon"); 073. "Racing in the Rain" (見せてくれ 雨のダウンヒル!! "Misete Kure Ame no Daunhiru!!"); 074. "Kids At Play" (不気味なエリア外新勢力!! "Bukimi na Eria Gai Shin Seiryoku!!"); 075. "Partial Showers in the Mountains" (レインバトルの恐怖を知れ!! "Reinbatoru no Kyōfu wo Shire!!"); 076. "The Genius that knows no Bounds" (絶叫ドライブ つきぬける天才!! "Zekkyō Doraibu Tsukinukeru Tensai!!")
RX-7 FD3S vs GT-R R32, Trueno AE86 vs Silvia S14
8	September 5, 1997	4-06-336686-3	October 7, 2003	978-1-59182-041-3
077. "Shoker at Myogi!" (三つどもえ 戦慄の妙義!! "Mitsudomoe Senritsu no Myōgi!!"); 078. "Great Racers Cast Long Shadows" (最強軍団の影 "Saikyō Gundan no Kage"); 079. "Doomsday Weapon of the Mountain Road" (掟やぶりのスーパーウエポン "Okite Yaburi no Sūpāuepon"); 080. "How to Soup Up an Eight Six: Phase One" (ハチロク ターボ化計画パート(1) "Hachi Roku Tābo ka Keikaku Pāto (1)"); 081. "Forever Rivals" (宿命のライバル "Shukumei no Raibaru"); 082. "Chance of Victory: Zero Percent" (勝率0パーセント!! "Shōritsu 0 Pāsento!!"); 083. "Evo IV Attacks" (エボIV出撃 "Ebo IV Shutsugeki"); 084. "The Threat Known as Emperor" (エンペラーの脅威 "Enperā no Kyōi"); 085. "Next Victim: The Eight Six!" (ハチロク出撃 秋名山でむかえうて!! "Hachi Roku Shutsugeki Akinasan de Mukaeute!!"); 086. "High Tech Versus Extreme Skills" (ハイテクVS.スーパーテクニック "Haiteku VS. Sūpā Tekunikku"); 087. "Premonition of Defeat" (敗北の予感 "Haiboku no Yokan")
Trueno AE86 vs Lan-Evo IV
9	December 5, 1997	4-06-336706-1	December 9, 2003	978-1-59182-109-0
088. "Look Out! Hawk's Getting Pissed Off" (清次の怒り "Seiji no Ikari"); 089. "Lightning Bolt in the Steering Column" (剛腕清次 電光ステアリング "Gōwan Seiji Denkō Sutearingu"); 090. "The Trouble with Slow Turns" (低速コーナーの落とし穴 "Teisoku Kōnā no Otoshiana"); 091. "Tak's Killer Move: The Gutter Hook!" (必殺ミゾ落としパート2!! "Hissatsu Mizo Otoshi Pāto 2!!"); 092. "Time for a Miracle!" (奇跡のショータイム!! "Kiseki no Shō Taimu!!"); 093. "Assault on Akagi" (赤城山決戦 "Akagiyama Kessen"); 094. "Natalie Likes to Watch" (なつきちゃん ギャラリーに行く "Natsuki-chan Gyararī ni Iku"); 095. "Let Tak Do the Driving!" (拓海くん 運転かわって!! "Takumi-kun Unten Kawatte!!"); 096. "How to Make Tsukamoto Faint" (悶絶 塚本先輩 "Monzetsu Tsukamoto Senpai"); 097. "Kyle Sudoh's Secret Weapon" (須藤京一の秘密兵器 "Sudō Kyōichi no Himitsu Heiki"); 098. "I'm in Love with the Boy" (好きになった男の子 "Suki ni Natta Otokonoko")
Trueno AE86 vs Lan-Evo IV, Nissan 180SX (Takumi, on Tsukamoto's car) vs Nissan Silvia S13 (unofficial, not really considered)
10	February 6, 1998	4-06-336718-5	February 4, 2004	978-1-59182-110-6
099. "Inquiring Minds Want to Know" (ふくれていく疑惑 "Fukureteiku Giwaku"); 100. "The Last Thing Tak Wanted to See" (衝撃の目撃 赤城へ!! "Shōgeki no Mokugeki Akagi he!!"); 101. "Do or Die in Akagi" (玉砕上等 火の玉バトル "Gyokusai Jōtō Hinotama Batoru"); 102. "There's a Crazy Look in His Eyes!!" (壮絶 赤城おろし!! "Sōzetsu Akagi Oroshi!!"); 103. "Kyle Sudoh Has the Moves of a Pro" (さえわたる京一のテクニック "Saewataru Kyōichi no Tekunikku"); 104. "My Engine's Bigger Than Your Engine!!" (泣け!! オレの4A-G "Nake!! Ore no 4A-G"); 105. "The Evo III Refuses to Love" (抵抗 "Teikō"); 106. "Countdown to Catastrophe" (破滅へのカウントダウン!! "Hametsu heno Kauntodaun!!"); 107. "Sayonara, My Sweet Eight Six" (さよなら大好きなハチロク "Sayonara Daisuki na Hachi Roku"); 108. "Grieving for a Dead Engine" (再起不能 "Saiki Funō"); 109. "The Solemn Vow of K.T. Takahashi" (混迷 "Kommei"); 110. "Mystery of the Second Eight Six" (因縁の対決 再び!! "Innen no Taiketsu Futatabi!!")
Trueno AE86 vs Lan-Evo III (somewhat unofficial)
11	May 7, 1998	4-06-336736-3	April 6, 2004	978-1-59182-174-8
111. "Spitfire in Black and White" (白と黒の閃光 "Shiro to Kuro no Senkō"); 112. "Subtle Interaction at 350 hp (260 kW)!" (見えないかけひき "Mie Nai Kake Hiki"); 113. "A Nightmare Comes True!" (悪夢のデジャヴー "Akumu no Dejabū"); 114. "Twilight of a Racing Idol" (カリスマ崩壊 "Karisuma Hōkai"); 115. "A New Level of Terror!!" (恐怖の突破口をつけ!! "Kyōfu no Toppakō wo Tsuke!!"); 116. "He Shoots! He Shoots!" (明暗!! "Meian!!"); 117. "A New Legend Picks Up Speed" (走り始める新たな伝説 "Hashiri Hajimeru Arata na Densetsu"); 118. "That Car is Too Dangerous!" (そのクルマ凶暴につき "Sono Kuruma Kyōbō Nitsuki"); 119. "First Contact" (ファーストコンタクト "Fāsuto Kontakuto"); 120. "Is It Spring... or Still Autumn?" (紅葉の季節に春が来る? "Kōyō no Kisetsu ni Haru ga Kuru?"); 121. "Dawn of the Eight Six Levin Turbo" (最強のハチロクレビン!! "Saikyō no Hachiroku Rebin!!")
RX-7 FC3S vs Lan-Evo III
12	August 6, 1998	4-06-336751-7	June 1, 2004	978-1-59182-462-6
122. "Day of the Eight Six Levin Turbo" (最強のハチロクレビン!!(本当の後編) "Saikyō no Hachiroku Rebin!! (Hontō no Kōhen)"); 123. "K.T. Takes the Levin Challenge" (啓介VS. 渉!? "Keisuke VS. Wataru!?"); 124. "Close Shave for the FD!!" (FD危機一髪!! "FD Kiki Ippatsu!!"); 125. "There's Always a First Love" (初恋のゆくえ? "Hatsukoi no Yukue?"); 126. "The Breakthrough!" (板ばさみ "Itabasami"); 127. "Opposites Attract" (反発 "Hanpatsu"); 128. "The Seal Shall Be Broken" (封印からの開放 "Fūin Kara no Kaihō"); 129. "This Means War!" (宣戦布告 "Sensen Fukoku"); 130. "Night of Wild Emotions" (胸さわぎの夜 "Munasawagi no Yoru"); 131. "The Private Pact" (二人だけの約束 "Futari Dake no Yakusoku"); 132. "Showdown at Dawn" (激突の朝 "Gekitotsu no Asa"); 133. "Turbo VS Racing Engine!" (ターボVS. レーシングチューン "Tābo VS. Rēshinguchūn")
RX-7 FD3S vs Levin AE86 Turbo (unofficial, not really considered)
13	November 6, 1998	4-06-336765-7	August 3, 2004	978-1-59182-463-3
134. "Saitama, Land of Many Colors" (彩の国 埼玉(意味不明) "Sai no Kuni Saitama (Imi Fumei)"); 135. "Here Comes the Mighty Turbo!" (ふりまわせ ドッカンターボ "Furimawase Dokkantābo"); 136. "Prepare for a Rude Awakening!" (覚醒の予感 "Kakusei no Yokan"); 137. "Breakout Time!" (封印が解かれる瞬間(とき) "Fūin ga Tokareru Toki"); 138. "War Amidst the Exhaust" (苛酷な消耗戦 "Kakoku na Shōmō Sen"); 139. "Racing Down!!" (戦闘力低下!! "Sentō Ryoku Teika!!"); 140. "The Virtues of Horsepower" (馬力(パワー)の代償 "Pawā no Daishō"); 141. "A Sudden Turnabout" (形勢逆転 "Keisei Gyakuten"); 142. "The Final Round" (ファイナルラウンド "Fainaru Raundo"); 143. "As Suddenly as It Began" (予期せぬ幕切れ!! "Yoki Senu Makugire!!"); 144. "Resolutions" (決心 "Kesshin"); 145. "Time of the Season" (移りゆく季節の中で "Utsuriyuku Kisetsu no Naka de")
Trueno AE86 vs Levin AE86 Turbo (private battle)
14	March 5, 1999	4-06-336786-X	October 12, 2004	978-1-59182-464-0
146. "The White Comet Option" (涼介からのオファー "Ryōsuke Kara no Ofā"); 147. "An Intriguing Proposition" (ギブ アンド テイク "Gibu Ando Teiku"); 148. "Challenge at Iroha Hill!" (挑戦!!いろは坂 "Chōsen!! Iroha Zaka"); 149. "A Battle Never Fought" (やり残したバトル "Yari Nokoshi ta Batoru"); 150. "Power Under Pressure!!" (試される実力!! "Tamesa Reru Jitsuryoku!!"); 151. "He's Got the Skills That Shock!" (驚愕の戦闘力!! "Kyōgaku no Sentō Ryoku!!"); 152. "Misfire VS Low Center of Gravity" (ミスファイアVS低重心 "Misu Faia VS Tei Jūshin"); 153. "The Prodigy VS the Iron Man" (天才VS鉄人 "Tensai VS Tetsujin"); 154. "A Plan for Victory" (勝利へのシナリオ "Shōri he no Shinario"); 155. "Three Bridges to Victory (part 1)" (大決着!!トリプルカウンター "Dai Ketchaku!! Toripuru Kauntā"); 156. "Three Bridges to Victory (part 2)" (大決着!!トリプルカウンター(後編) "Dai Ketchaku!! Toripuru Kauntā (Kōhen)"); 157. "The Provocation" (触発 "Shokuhatsu"); 158. "The Solution" (追及 "Tsuikyū")
Trueno AE86 vs Lan-Evo III
15	May 7, 1999	4-06-336799-1	December 14, 2004	978-1-59182-465-7
159. "Agreement at Dawn" (暁の協定 "Akatsuki no Kyōtei"); 160. "A worthy Competitor" (現れた強敵 "Arawareta Kyōteki"); 161. "Under Very Similar Circumstances (part 1)" (よく似た境遇 "Yoku Nita Kyōgū"); 162. "Under Very Similar Circumstances (part 2)" (よく似た境遇(後編) "Yoku Nita Kyōgū (Kōhen)"); 163. "Kogashiwa's Career" (小柏のキャリア "Kogashiwa no Kyaria"); 164. "Strategies Intertwined" (からみあう戦略 "Karamiau Senryaku"); 165. "Special Traits of the Midship" (ミッドシップの本領 "Middoshippu no Honryō"); 166. "More Strategies Intertwined" (からみあう戦略 "Karamiau Senryaku"); 167. "Putting the 'In' in Inverse Cornering" (インベタのさらにイン!! "In Beta no Sarani In!!"); 168. "The Tricky Line" (えげつないライン "Egetsunai Rain"); 169. "Bunta's Advice" (文太のアドバイス "Bunta no Adobaisu"); 170. "The Father and Son Counter Attack!!" (反撃!!藤原親子 "Hangeki!! Fujiwara Oyako")
Trueno AE86 vs MR2 SW20
16	August 6, 1999	4-06-336818-1	February 8, 2005	978-1-59182-992-8
171. "Aerial Battle" (空中戦 "Kūchū Sen"); 172. "The Search" (模索 "Mosaku"); 173. "First Snow" (初雪 "Hatsuyuki"); 174. "Power of the Tears" (涙のパワー "Namida no Pawā"); 175. "Newbie Part-timer (part 1)" (新人アルバイト "Shinjin Arubaito"); 176. "Newbie Part-timer (part 2)" (新人アルバイト(後編) "Shinjin Arubaito (Kōhen)"); 177. "White Christmas (part 1)" (ホワイトクリスマス "Howaito Kurisumasu"); 178. "White Christmas (part 2)" (ホワイトクリスマス(後編) "Howaito Kurisumasu (Kōhen)"); 179. "Time Limit" (タイムリミット "Taimu Rimitto"); 180. "Conqueror of the Winter" (冬を制する者 "Fuyu wo Seisuru Mono"); 181. "Natsuki's Crisis (part 1)" (なつきのピンチ "Natsuki no Pinchi"); 182. "Natsuki's Crisis (part 2)" (なつきのピンチ(後編) "Natsuki no Pinchi (Kōhen)"); 183. "White Silver Battle (part 1)" (白銀バトル "Hakugin Batoru"); 184. "White Silver Battle (part 2)" (白銀バトル(後編) "Hakugin Batoru (Kōhen)")
Trueno AE86 vs MR2 SW20, Trueno AE86 vs Celica GT-Four (unofficial, not really considered)
17	December 22, 1999	4-06-336840-8	April 12, 2005	978-1-59182-993-5
185. "Confessions" (告白 "Kokuhaku"); 186. "Valentine's Day Sucks" (バレンタインデーはせつないね "Barentaindē ha Setsunai ne"); 187. "The Pitter Patter of Spring" (春の足音 "Haru no Ashioto"); 188. "Dreams" (遠い夢に向かって "Tōi Yume ni Mukatte"); 189. "A Glimpse Inside" (炎のコースレコード "Honoo no Kōsurekōdo"); 190. "The Future" (それぞれの未来 "Sorezore no Mirai"); 191. "Leaving" (旅立ち "Tabidachi"); 192. "Project D" (プロジェクトD "Purojekuto D"); 193. "Gunma Road Warriors" (群馬エリアからの挑戦者 "Gunma Eria Kara no Chōsen Sha"); 194. "Double Aces" (ダブルエース "Daburu Ēsu"); 195. "Fear (戦々恐々 "Sensenkyōkyō"); 196. "Tohru Matsuhara the Downhill Kamikaze" (カミカゼダウンヒル!!末次トオル "Kamikaze Daunhiru!! Suetsugu Tōru"); 197. "Ditch Daredevils" (埋もれた実力者 "Umoreta Jitsuryokusha"); 198. "Relentless" (イカれてる奴はどっちだ!? "Ikareteru Yatsu ha Docchi da!?")
Trueno AE86 vs Roadster NA6C

=== Part 2: Project D ===
No.	Original release date	Original ISBN	English release date	English ISBN
18	April 6, 2000	4-06-336860-2	June 7, 2005	978-1-59182-994-2
199. "Relentless (Part 2)" (イカれてる奴はどっちだ!?(後編) "Ikareteru Yatsu ha Docchi da!? (Kōhen)"); 200. "Taking the Ditches" (落とし穴側溝を攻略せよ!! "Otoshiana Sokkō wo Kōryaku Seyo!!"); 201. "Taking the Ditches (Part 2)" (落とし穴側溝を攻略せよ!!(後編) "Otoshiana Sokkō wo Kōryaku Seyo!! (Kōhen)"); 202. "Tohru's Honorable Defeat" (トオル玉砕!! "Tōru Gyokusai!!"); 203. "Full Throttle Hill Climb" (全開ヒルクライム!! "Zenkai Hirukuraimu!!"); 204. "Full Throttle Hill Climb (Part 2)" (全開ヒルクライム!!(後編) "Zenkai Hirukuraimu!! (Kōhen)"); 205. "Proof of Growth" (成長の証 "Seichō no Akashi"); 206. "Riding the Strongest FD" (最強のFD乗り "Saikyō no FD Nori"); 207. "When Skill Molds Power" (技術が馬力(パワー)をしのぐ時 "Gijutsu ga Pawā wo Shinogu Toki"); 208. "The Old Gang in Akina" (秋名の仲間達 "Akina no Nakama Tachi"); 209. "The Project D Lasso" (プロジェクトD包囲網 "Purojekuto D Hōi Mō"); 210. "The Project D Lasso (Part 2)" (プロジェクトD包囲網(後編) "Purojekuto D Hōi Mō (Kōhen)"); 211. "The Power of Daiki" (大輝の実力 "Daiki no Jitsuryoku"); 212. "The Power of Daiki (Part 2)" (大輝の実力(後編) "Daiki no Jitsuryoku (Kōhen)")
Trueno AE86 vs Roadster NA6C, RX-7 FD3S vs Skyline 25GT-t R34
19	August 4, 2000	4-06-336887-4	August 9, 2005	978-1-59182-995-9
213. "Countdown Before Battle" (決戦前夜 "Kessen Zenya"); 214. "Daiki VS Takumi (part 1)" (大輝VS. 拓海 "Daiki VS. Takumi"); 215. "Daiki VS Takumi (part 2)" (大輝VS. 拓海(後編) "Daiki VS. Takumi (Kōhen)"); 216. "Daiki's Astonishing Prowess" (恐るべし大輝の実力!! "Osorubeshi Daiki no Jitsuryoku!!"); 217. "Don't Look Behind" (ふりかえるな "Furikaeruna"); 218. "First Class Braking Expert" (ブレーキングの達人 "Burēkingu no Tatsujin"); 219. "Another Piece of Advice (part 1)" (もう一つのアドバイス "Mō Hitotsu no Adobaisu"); 220. "Another Piece of Advice (part 2)" (もう一つのアドバイス(後編) "Mō Hitotsu no Adobaisu (Kōhen)"); 221. "Strategy" (策略 "Sakuryaku"); 222. "Takumi Attacks!" (攻めろ拓海!! "Semero Takumi!!"); 223. "Miscalculation" (誤算 "Gosan"); 224. "Daiki Accelerates" (加速する大輝 "Kasoku Suru Daiki"); 225. "Counterstrikes" (反攻ののろし "Hankō no Noroshi"); 226. "Eyeing for Victory" (虎視眈々 "Koshitantan"); 227. "Breakthrough" (突破口 "Toppakō")
Trueno AE86 vs Civic EK9
20	December 26, 2000	4-06-336919-6	November 8, 2005	978-1-59182-996-6
228. "Racer That Operates FF" (FFターボを操る男 "FF Tābo wo Ayatsuru Otoko"); 229. "Short Final Battle (part 1)" (短期決戦 "Tanki Kessen"); 230. "Short Final Battle (part 2)" (短期決戦(後編) "Tanki Kessen (Kōhen)"); 231. "Keisuke Took the Dait" (罠に落ちる啓介 "Wana ni Ochiru Keisuke"); 232. "Sudden Conflict" (激突 "Gekitotsu"); 233. "When the Smile Fades" (スマイルが止まる時 "Sumairu ga Tomaru Toki"); 234. "The Final Outcome" (決着のゴールへ "Ketchaku no Gōru he"); 235. "Geared Up OB" (決起するOBたち "Kekki Suru OB Tachi"); 236. "The Record That Was Rewritten (part 1)" (塗り替えられたレコード "Nurikae Rareta Rekōdo"); 237. "The Record That Was Rewritten (part 2)" (塗り替えられたレコード(後編) "Nurikae Rareta Rekōdo (Kōhen)"); 238. "A Call from Kyoichi" (ホットライン "Hottorain"); 239. "Who Will Answer the Challenge!?" (走るのは誰!? "Hashiru no ha Dare!?"); 240. "Trial Run (part 1)" (プラクティス "Purakutisu"); 241. "Trial Run (part 2)" (プラクティス(後編) "Purakutisu (Kōhen)"); 242. "Marching Towards a Victorious Start (part 1)" (勝利へのスタートライン "Shōri heno Sutātorain")
RX-7 FD3S vs Integra DC2
21	May 1, 2001	4-06-336948-X	February 7, 2006	978-1-59182-997-3
243. "Marching Towards a Victorious Start (part 2)" (勝利へのスタートライン(後編) "Shōri heno Sutātorain (Kōhen)"); 244. "The First Corner (part 1)" (第1コーナー "Dai 1 Kōnā"); 245. "The First Corner (part 2)" (第1コーナー(後編) "Dai 1 Kōnā (Kōhen)"); 246. "Doubt (part 1)" (疑問 "Gimon"); 247. "Doubt (part 2)" (疑問(後編) "Gimon (Kōhen)"); 248. "The Criteria for a Professional Racer" (プロたるゆえん "Puro Taru Yuen"); 249. "The Disappearing Line" (消えるライン "Kieru Rain"); 250. "Toudou Juku's Miscalculation" (東堂塾の誤算 "Tōdō Juku no Gosan"); 251. "Point of Return" (ターニングポイント "Tāningu Pointo"); 252. "Blind Pursuit" (ブラインド・アタック "Buraindo Atakku"); 253. "The Strength of a Professional Racer" (プロの底力 "Puro no Sokojikara"); 254. "Approaching the End" (近づくゴール "Chikazuku Gōru"); 255. "The Final Stretch" (最終セクション "Saishū Sekushon"); 256. "The Ending Point Climax (part 1)" (怒濤のゴール "Dotō no Gōru"); 257. "The Ending Point Climax (part 2)" (怒濤のゴール(後編) "Dotō no Gōru (Kōhen)")
Trueno AE86 vs Todo Civic EK9
22	September 6, 2001	4-06-336969-2	May 9, 2006	978-1-59182-998-0
258. "Nightmarish Vehicle (part 1)" (悪夢のマシン "Akumu no Mashin"); 259. "Nightmarish Vehicle (part 2)" (悪夢のマシン(後編) "Akumu no Mashin (Kōhen)"); 260. "85 Turbo" (ハチゴーターボ "Hachi Gō Tābo"); 261. "An Eventful Test Drive" (波乱のシェイクダウン "Haran no Sheikudaun"); 262. "Proof of Maturity (part 1)" (成長の証 "Seichō no Akashi"); 263. "Proof of Maturity (part 2)" (成長の証(後編) "Seichō no Akashi (Kōhen)"); 264. "Defeat the Fatso" (デブ退治 "Debu Taiji"); 265. "The Rotary Prince (part 1)" (ロータリーに乗った王子様 "Rōtarī ni Notta Ōji Sama"); 266. "The Rotary Prince (part 2)" (ロータリーに乗った王子様(後編) "Rōtarī ni Notta Ōji Sama (Kōhen)"); 267. "The Feelings of First Love" (ウブな恋心 "Ubu na Koigokoro"); 268. "We Meet Again" (再会 "Saikai"); 269. "An Upheaved Heart Before the Race" (バトル直前!!ゆれる心 "Batoru Chokuzen!! Yureru Kokoro"); 270. "Knight in Shining Armor Indeed" (やっぱり王子様 "Yappari Ōji Sama"); 271. "FD VS FD" (FD VS FD); 272. "The Driving Force of Kyoko's Love" (恭子の純愛モチベーション "Kyōko no Junai Mochibēshon")
Trueno AE86 vs Impreza STi, Levin AE85 vs Silvia S15 (both unofficial)
23	December 26, 2001	4-06-361012-8	August 1, 2006	978-1-59532-000-1
273. "A Battle of the Spectators (part 1)" (前哨戦 "Zenshō Sen"); 274. "A Battle of the Spectators (part 2)" (前哨戦(後編) "Zenshō Sen (Kōhen)"); 275. "Single Turbo VS Twin-Turbo" (シングルターボVS. ツインターボ "Shinguru Tābo VS. Tsuin Tābo"); 276. "High-Stress Emotions (part 1)" (白熱のランデブー "Hakunetsu no Randebū"); 277. "High-Stress Emotions (part 2)" (白熱のランデブー(後編) "Hakunetsu no Randebū (Kōhen)"); 278. "The Ability to "Awaken" (part 1)" (きらめく才能 "Kirameku Sainō"); 279. "The Ability to "Awaken" (part 2)" (きらめく才能(後編) "Kirameku Sainō (Kōhen)"); 280. "The Sad Result" (せつない決着 "Setsunai Ketchaku"); 281. "Kyoko Proves Her Sincerity (part 1)" (恭子の告白 "Kyōko no Kokuhaku"); 282. "Kyoko Proves Her Sincerity (part 2)" (恭子の告白(後編) "Kyōko no Kokuhaku (Kōhen)"); 283. "Nobuhiko's Discovery (part 1)" (延彦の発見 "Nobuhiko no Hakken"); 284. "Nobuhiko's Discovery (part 2)" (延彦の発見(後編) "Nobuhiko no Hakken (Kōhen)"); 285. "Keisuke and Kyoko" (啓介と恭子 "Keisuke to Kyōko"); 286. "Trapping the Hachi Roku (part 1)" (ハチロク包囲網 "Hachi Roku Hōi Mō"); 287. "Trapping the Hachi Roku (part 2)" (ハチロク包囲網(後編) "Hachi Roku Hōi Mō (Kōhen)"); 288. "The Biggest Obstacle (part 1)" (最大の難関 "Saidai no Nankan")
RX-7 FD3S (Keisuke) vs RX-7 FD3S (Kyoko), Trueno AE86 vs Altezza
24	June 6, 2002	4-06-361043-8	October 31, 2006	978-1-59532-001-8
289. "The Biggest Obstacle (part 2)" (最大の難関(後編) "Saidai no Nankan (Kōhen)"); 290. "The Unknown Factor (part 1)" (不確定要素 "Fukakutei Yōso"); 291. "The Unknown Factor (part 2)" (不確定要素(後編) "Fukakutei Yōso (Kōhen)"); 292. "A Short Rest" (つかの間の休息 "Tsukanoma no Kyūsoku"); 293. "The Start of a Fierce Battle (part 1)" (死闘のゴング "Shitō no Gongu"); 294. "The Start of a Fierce Battle (part 2)" (死闘のゴング(後編) "Shitō no Gongu (Kōhen)"); 295. "Contemplation Comes to a Halt" (思考停止 "Shikō Teishi"); 296. "Ryousuke's Miscalculation" (涼介のミス!? "Ryōsuke no Misu!?"); 297. "A Mistake" (カンちがい "Kan Chigai"); 298. "Plus Alpha (part 1)" (プラスアルファ "Purasu Arufa"); 299. "Plus Alpha (part 2)" (プラスアルファ(後編) "Purasu Arufa (Kōhen)"); 300. "The Ultimate Technique Has No Effect (part 1)" (必殺技不発 "Hissatsu Waza Fuhatsu"); 301. "The Ultimate Technique Has No Effect (part 2)" (必殺技不発(後編) "Hissatsu Waza Fuhatsu (Kōhen)"); 302. "The Straightaway of Conflicting Emotions (part 1)" (失意と葛藤の直線(ストレート) "Shitsui to Kattō no Sutorēto"); 303. "The Straightaway of Conflicting Emotions (part 2)" (失意と葛藤の直線(ストレート)(後編) "Shitsui to Kattō no Sutorēto (Kōhen)"); 304. "The Final Conclusion" (最終局面 "Saishū Kyokumen"); 305. "Supercharged Levin (part 1)" (スーパーチャージドレビン "Sūpāchājido Rebin")
Trueno AE86 vs Cappuccino
25	November 6, 2002	4-06-361073-X	January 30, 2007	978-1-59532-002-5
306. "Supercharged Levin (part 2)" (スーパーチャージドレビン(後編) "Sūpāchājido Rebin (Kōhen)"); 307. "Wataru's Improvement (part 1)" (渉の進歩 "Wataru no Shinpo"); 308. "Wataru's Improvement (part 2)" (渉の進歩(後編) "Wataru no Shinpo (Kōhen)"); 309. "Motivation's Secret" (モチベーションの秘密 "Mochibēshon no Himitsu"); 310. "The Sense of Rivalry (part 1)" (ライバル意識 "Raibaru Ishiki"); 311. "The Sense of Rivalry (part 2)" (ライバル意識(後編) "Raibaru Ishiki (Kōhen)"); 312. "Burdensome Fatigue (part 1)" (つみ重なる疲労 "Tsumi Kasanaru Hirō"); 313. "Burdensome Fatigue (part 2)" (つみ重なる疲労(後編) "Tsumi Kasanaru Hirō (Kōhen)"); 314. "A New Enemy" (新たなる敵 "Arata Naru Teki"); 315. "Victory (part 1)" (決着 "Ketchaku"); 316. "Victory (part 2)" (決着(後編) "Ketchaku (Kōhen)"); 317. "The Nightmare Car Appears Again" (悪夢のマシン再び "Akumu no Mashin Futatabi"); 318. "Confusion (part 1)" (混乱 "Konran"); 319. "Confusion (part 2)" (混乱(後編) "Konran (Kōhen)"); 320. "Itsuki Gets Lucky (part 1)" (イツキ絶好調 "Itsuki Zekkōchō"); 321. "Itsuki Gets Lucky (part 2)" (イツキ絶好調(後編) "Itsuki Zekkōchō (Kōhen)")
RX-7 FD3S vs Levin AE86 Supercharged
26	March 6, 2003	4-06-361118-3	May 1, 2007	978-1-59532-003-2
322. "Confusion and Loneliness (part 1)" (混乱と孤独 "Konran to Kodoku"); 323. "Confusion and Loneliness (part 2)" (混乱と孤独(後編) "Konran to Kodoku (Kōhen)"); 324. "Itsuki Runs Wild (part 1)" (イツキ暴走 "Itsuki Bōsō"); 325. "Itsuki Runs Wild (part 2)" (イツキ暴走(後編) "Itsuki Bōsō (Kōhen)"); 326. "Itsuki. You're Blunt" (イツキくんて強引だよォ "Itsuki kun te Gōin Dayō"); 327. "A Man's Resolve (part 1)" (男の決心 "Otoko no Kesshin"); 328. "A Man's Resolve (part 2)" (男の決心(後編) "Otoko no Kesshin (Kōhen)"); 329. "To the Hotel (part 1)" (ホテル行きます "Hoteru Iki Masu"); 330. "To the Hotel (part 2)" (ホテル行きます(後編) "Hoteru Iki Masu (Kōhen)"); 331. "Into Open Arms" (ドーンといってみよう "Dōn to Itte Miyō"); 332. "The Two Hachi-Roku Masters (part 1)" (二人のハチロクマイスター "Futari no Hachi Roku Maisutā"); 333. "The Two Hachi-Roku Masters (part 2)" (二人のハチロクマイスター(後編) "Futari no Hachi Roku Maisutā (Kōhen)"); 334. "The Last Saitama Area Battle (part 1)" (埼玉エリア最終戦 "Saitama Eria Saishū Sen"); 335. "The Last Saitama Area Battle (part 2)" (埼玉エリア最終戦(後編) "Saitama Eria Saishū Sen (Kōhen)"); 336. "Keisuke Falls Into the Trap (part 1)" (啓介を襲う罠 "Keisuke wo Osō Wana"); 337. "Keisuke Falls Into the Trap (part 2)" (啓介を襲う罠(後編) "Keisuke wo Osō Wana (Kōhen)"); 338. "A Huge Cost" (大きな代償 "Ōkina Daishō"); 339. "Time Limit" (タイムリミット "Taimu Rimitto")
Impreza STi (deliveries)
27	September 5, 2003	4-06-361145-0	August 14, 2007	978-1-59532-800-7
340. "That Hopeless Sound of the Rotary (絶望の淵に轟くロータリーサウンド Zetsubō no Fuchi ni Todoroku Rōtarī Saundo); 341. "That Hopeless Sound of the Rotary (Part 2) (絶望の淵に轟くロータリーサウンド(後編) Zetsubō no Fuchi ni Todoroku Rōtarī Saundo (Kōhen)); 342. "Furious Climber" (怒りのヒルクライム "Ikari no Hirukuraimu"); 343. "Furious Climber (Part 2)" (怒りのヒルクライム(後編) "Ikari no Hirukuraimu (Kōhen)"); 344. "Lancer Evos: King of the Open Road" (陸の王者ランエボ "Riku no Ōja Ranebo"); 345. "High Speed Battle of Nerves" (戦慄の高速バトル "Senritsu no Kōsoku Batoru"); 346. "High Speed Battle of Nerves (Part 2)" (戦慄の高速バトル(後編) "Senritsu no Kōsoku Batoru (Kōhen)"); 347. "Time to Pass" (パッシング "Passhingu"); 348. "A Difference in Grade" (格の違い "Kaku no Chigai"); 349. "Strategy Session" (陽動作戦 "Yōdō Sakusen"); 350. "The Downhill Rocket" (弾丸ダウンヒル "Dangan Daunhiru"); 351. "The Downhill Rocket (Part 2)" (弾丸ダウンヒル(後編) "Dangan Daunhiru (Kōhen)"); 352. "A Minor Revelation" (小さな発見 "Chiisana Hakken"); 353. "Danger in the Rear View" (迫り来る危機 "Semari Kuru Kiki"); 354. "Danger in the Rear View (Part 2)" (迫り来る危機(後編) "Semari Kuru Kiki (Kōhen)"); 355. "Sudden Turn for the Worse" (急転直下 "Kyūtenchokka"); 356. "Decision Time" (決着!!そして窮地 "Ketchaku!! Soshite Kyūchi")
RX-7 FD3S (Kyoko's car, driven by Keisuke) vs Lan-Evo V, Trueno AE86 vs Lan-Evo VI
28	March 5, 2004	4-06-361209-0	November 6, 2007	978-1-59532-801-4
357. "Decision Time (Part 2)" (決着!!そして窮地(後編) "Ketchaku!! Soshite Kyūchi (Kōhen)"); 358. "A Brief Time-out" (インターバル "Intābaru"); 359. "K.T. and Kyoko" (啓介と恭子 "Keisuke to Kyōko"); 360. "K.T. and Kyoko (Part 2)" (啓介と恭子(後編) "Keisuke to Kyōko (Kōhen)"); 361. "Loneliness of the Driver" (孤独なランナー "Kodoku na Rannā"); 362. "Loneliness of the Driver (Part 2)" (孤独なランナー(後編) "Kodoku na Rannā (Kōhen)"); 363. "A Whole New Universe" (新天地へ "Shintenchi he"); 364. "A Whole New Universe (Part 2)" (新天地へ(後編) "Shintenchi he (Kōhen)"); 365. "Return of the FD" (FD復活 "FD Fukkatsu"); 366. "Aging Bikers and Purple Shadows (中年暴走族「パープルシャドウ」 "Chūnen Bōsō Zoku 'Pāpurushadō'"); 367. "Intervention" (立ちはだかる最強の壁 "Tachihadakaru Saikyō no Kabe"); 368. "Practice" (プラクティス "Purakutisu"); 369. "Pressure" (プレッシャー "Puresshā"); 370. "Day of Decision" (決戦当日 "Kessen Tōjitsu"); 371. "Day of Decision (Part 2)" (決戦当日(後編) "Kessen Tōjitsu (Kōhen)"); 372. "Steering with the Strong Hand" (ワンハンドステア "Wanhandosutea"); 373. "Steering with the Strong Hand (Part 2)" (ワンハンドステア(後編) "Wanhandosutea (Kōhen)")
RX-7 FD3S (Keisuke, newly modified, trial runs), Trueno AE86 vs S2000
29	August 6, 2004	4-06-361253-8	February 5, 2008	978-1-59532-802-1
374. "Premonition to a War of Exhaustion" (消耗戦の予感 "Shōmō Sen no Yokan"); 375. "Most Powerful Cornering Machine (part 1)" (最強のコーナリングマシン "Saikyō no Kōnaringu Mashin"); 376. "Most Powerful Cornering Machine (part 2)" (最強のコーナリングマシン(後編) "Saikyō no Kōnaringu Mashin (Kōhen)"); 377. "Ghost Line (part 1)" (幽霊(ゴースト)ライン "Yūrei (Gōsuto) Rain"); 378. "Ghost Line (part 2)" (幽霊(ゴースト)ライン(後編) "Yūrei (Gōsuto) Rain (Kōhen)"); 379. "Amazing Pace Control (part 1)" (驚異のペース管理 "Kyōi no Pēsu Kanri"); 380. "Amazing Pace Control (part 2)" (驚異のペース管理(後編) "Kyōi no Pēsu Kanri (Kōhen)"); 381. "The True Line ("本気のライン "Honki no Rain"); 382. "Predetermined Harmony (part 1)" (予定調和 "Yotei Chōwa"); 383. "Predetermined Harmony (part 2)" (予定調和(後編) "Yotei Chōwa (Kōhen)"); 384. "God Arm Panics!!" (ゴッドアームあわてる!! "Goddo Āmu Awateru!!"); 385. "Break Down the One Hand Steer!! (part 1)" (ワンハンドステアをくずせ!! "Wanhandosutea wo Kuzuse!!"); 386. "Break Down the One Hand Steer!! (part 2)" (ワンハンドステアをくずせ!!(後編) "Wanhandosutea wo Kuzuse!! (Kōhen)"); 387. "Blind Gutter Hook" (ブラインド溝落とし "Buraindo Mizo Otoshi"); 388. "Endless Battle (part 1)" (エンドレスバトル "Endoresu Batoru"); 389. "Endless Battle (part 2)" (エンドレスバトル(後編) "Endoresu Batoru (Kōhen)")
Trueno AE86 vs S2000
30	November 29, 2004	4-06-361283-X	May 6, 2008	978-1-59816-899-0
390. "Going Off Balance" (くずれていくバランス "Kuzurete Iku Baransu"); 391. "Expert" (熟練 "Jukuren"); 392. "Critical Point (part 1)" (臨界点 "Rinkaiten"); 393. "Critical Point (part 2)" (臨界点(後編) "Rinkaiten (Kōhen)"); 394. "I Will Be the One to Defeat God Foot" (ゴットフットはオレが倒す "Gottofutto ha Ore ga Taosu"); 395. "Unworldly GT-R (part 1)" (超絶GT-R "Chōzetsu GT-R"); 396. "Unworldly GT-R (part 2)" (超絶GT-R(後編) "Chōzetsu GT-R (Kōhen)"); 397. "Cooling System" (クーリングシステム "Kūringu Shisutemu"); 398. "Ryosuke's Motive (part 1)" (涼介の真意 "Ryōsuke no Shini"); 399. "Ryosuke's Motive (part 2)" (涼介の真意(中編) "Ryōsuke no Shini (Chūhen)"); 400. "Ryosuke's Motive (part 3)" (涼介の真意(後編) "Ryōsuke no Shini (Kōhen)"); 401. "Turning Point (part 1)" (ターニングポイント "Tāningu Pointo"); 402. "Turning Point (part 2)" (ターニングポイント(後編) "Tāningu Pointo (Kōhen)"); 403. "Invisible Dog Fight (part 1)" (見えないドッグファイト "Mie Nai Doggufaito"); 404. "Invisible Dog Fight (part 2)" (見えないドッグファイト(後編) "Mie Nai Doggufaito (Kōhen)"); Extra Story "West Gate" (ウエストゲート "Uesuto Gēto")
Trueno AE86 vs S2000, RX-7 FD3S vs GT-R R34
31	June 6, 2005	4-06-361327-5	August 5, 2008	978-1-59816-900-3
405. "Accelerating Keisuke (part 1)" (加速する啓介 "Kasoku Suru Keisuke"); 406. "Accelerating Keisuke (part 2)" (加速する啓介(後編) "Kasoku Suru Keisuke (Kōhen)"); 407. "Overlapping Coordinates (part 1)" (重なる座標 "Kasanaru Zahyō"); 408. "Overlapping Coordinates (part 2)" (重なる座標(中編) "Kasanaru Zahyō (Chūhen)"); 409. "Overlapping Coordinates (part 3)" (重なる座標(後編) "Kasanaru Zahyō (Kōhen)"); 410. "Crashing Wave-Lake Goal" (怒涛のゴール "Dotō no Gōru"); 411. "Position Change (part 1") (ポジションチェンジ "Pojishon Chenji"); 412. "Position Change (part 2)" (ポジションチェンジ(後編) "Pojishon Chenji (Kōhen)"); 413. "Unexpected Breach (part 1)" (意外な突破口 "Igai na Toppakō"); 414. "Unexpected Breach (part 2)" (意外な突破口(後編) "Igai na Toppakō (Kōhen)"); 415. "A Concerned Keisuke (part 1)" (追いつめられる啓介 "Oitsumerareru Keisuke"); 416. "A Concerned Keisuke (part 2)" (追いつめられる啓介(後編) "Oitsumerareru Keisuke (Kōhen)"); 417. "Striking Pride (part 1)" (ぶつかりあう意地 "Butsukariau Iji"); 418. "Striking Pride (part 2)" (ぶつかりあう意地(後編) "Butsukariau Iji (Kōhen)"); 419. "To The Last Phase (part 1)" (最終局面へ "Saishū Kyokumen he"); 420. "To The Last Phase (part 2)" (最終局面へ(後編) "Saishū Kyokumen he (Kōhen)"); 421. "Thin Ice Goal Line" (薄氷のゴールライン "Hakuhyō no Gōru Rain")
RX-7 FD3S vs GT-R R34
32	November 22, 2005	4-06-361381-X	October 12, 2008	978-1-59816-901-0
422. "Riding Together (part 1)" (同乗走行 "Dōjō Sōkō"); 423. "Riding Together (part 2)" (同乗走行(後編) "Dōjō Sōkō (Kōhen)"); 424. "Controlling the Big Rock" (磐石のコントロール "Banjaku no Kontorōru"); 425. "The Imposters Appear!? (part 1)" (ニセ者出現!? "Nisemono Shutsugen!?"); 426. "The Imposters Appear!? (part 2)" (ニセ者出現!?(後編) "Nisemono Shutsugen!? (Kōhen)"); 427. "Who is the Real One!?" (本モノはどっちだ!? "Hommono ha Docchi da!?"); 428. "Destined Encounter (part 1)" (運命の出会い "Ummei no Deai"); 429. "Destined Encounter (part 2)" (運命の出会い(後編) "Ummei no Deai (Kōhen)"); 430. "Hachi-Roku Revived (part 1)" (ハチロク復活 "Hachi Roku Fukkatsu"); 431. "Hachi-Roku Revived (part 2)" (ハチロク復活(後編) "Hachi Roku Fukkatsu (Kōhen)"); 432. "Cleaning Up the Imposters (part 1)" (ニセモノ包囲網 "Nisemono Hōi Mō"); 433. "Cleaning Up the Imposters (part 2)" (ニセモノ包囲網(後編) "Nisemono Hōi Mō (Kōhen)"); 434. "A Real Drift (part 1)" (本モノのドリフト "Hommono no Dorifuto"); 435. "A Real Drift (part 2)" (本モノのドリフト(後編) "Hommono no Dorifuto (Kōhen)"); 436. "A Settled Matter (part 1)" (一件落着 "Ikken Rakuchaku"); 437. "A Settled Matter (part 2)" (一件落着(後編) "Ikken Rakuchaku (Kōhen)"); 438. "A Moment of Rest (part 1)" (つかのまの安息 "Tsukanoma no Ansoku"); 439. "A Moment of Rest (part 2)" (つかのまの安息(後編) "Tsukanoma no Ansoku (Kōhen)")
Real Project D vs Fake Project D (no official battles)
33	August 4, 2006	4-06-361462-X	January 13, 2009	978-1-4278-0772-4
440. "A Driving Genius is also a Normal Boy" (天才ドライバーもふつうの男の子 "Tensai Doraibā mo Futsū no Otokonoko"); 441. "Perfection (part 1)" (充実 "Jūjitsu"); 442. "Perfection (part 2)" (充実(後編) "Jūjitsu (Kōhen)"); 443. "The Seeds of Growth" (成長の糧に "Seichō no Kate ni"); 444. "The New Battlefield" (新たなる戦場 "Aratanaru Senjō"); 445. "The First Line (part 1)" (第一のライン "Dai Ichi no Rain"); 446. "The First Line (part 2)" (第一のライン(後編) "Dai Ichi no Rain (Kōhen)"); 447. "Rushing into Practice (part 1)" (プラクティス突入 "Purakutisu Totsunyū"); 448. "Rushing into Practice (part 2)" (プラクティス突入(後編) "Purakutisu Totsunyū (Kōhen)"); 449. "Information Battle (part 1)" (情報戦 "Jōhō Sen"); 450. "Information Battle (part 2)" (情報戦(中編) "Jōhō Sen (Chūhen)"); 451. "Information Battle (part 3)" (情報戦(後編) "Jōhō Sen (Kōhen)"); 452. "Day of the Battle" (決戦当日 "Kessen Tōjitsu"); 453. "Hillclimb Start" (ヒルクライムスタート "Hirukuraimu Sutāto"); 454. "Evo with no Weak Spots (part 1)" (エボに死角なし "Ebo ni Shikaku Nashi"); Extra Story "West Gate 2" (ウエストゲート2 "Uesuto Gēto 2")
RX-7 FD3S vs Lan-Evo VII
34	November 27, 2006	4-06-361488-3	April 17, 2019	—
455. "Evo with no Weak Spots (part 2)" (エボに死角なし(後編) "Ebo ni Shikaku Nashi (Kōhen)"); 456. "Kobayakawa's Disappointment (part 1)" (小早川の不満 "Kobayakawa no Fuman"); 457. "Kobayakawa's Disappointment (part 2)" (小早川の不満(後編) "Kobayakawa no Fuman (Kōhen)"); 458. "A Silent Keisuke" (沈黙する啓介 "Chimmoku Suru Keisuke"); 459. "Fastest in North Kantou, Fireball Boy (part 1)" (北関東最速火の玉ボーイ "Kitakantō Saisoku Hinotama Bōi"); 460. "Fastest in North Kantou, Fireball Boy (part 2)" (北関東最速火の玉ボーイ(後編) "Kitakantō Saisoku Hinotama Bōi (Kōhen)"); 461. "Tension Max" (テンションマックス "Tenshon Makkusu"); 462. "The Last Situation" (最終局面 "Saishū Kyokumen"); 463. "Oomiya's Concern (part 1)" (大宮のおそれ "Ōmiya no Osore"); 464. "Oomiya's Concern (part 2)" (大宮のおそれ(後編) "Ōmiya no Osore (Kōhen)"); 465. "Premonition of a Hard Battle (part 1)" (激戦の予感 "Gekisen no Yokan"); 466. "Premonition of a Hard Battle (part 2)" (激戦の予感(後編) "Gekisen no Yokan (Kōhen)"); 467. "A Similar Concept" (よく似たコンセプト "Yoku nita Konseputo"); 468. "Advantage of Being a Local (part 1)" (地元のアドバンテージ "Jimoto no Adobantēji"); 469. "Advantage of Being a Local (part 2)" (地元のアドバンテージ(後編) "Jimoto no Adobantēji (Kōhen)"); 470. "Passing at the Middle (part 1)" (中間地点通過 "Chūkan Chiten Tsūka"); 471. "Passing at the Middle (part 2)" (中間地点通過(後編) "Chūkan Chiten Tsūka (Kōhen)")
RX-7 FD3S vs Lan-Evo VII, Trueno AE86 vs Roadster NB8C
35	May 2, 2007	978-4-06-361552-4	April 17, 2019	—
472. "Oomiya Awakens (part 1)" (大宮覚醒 "Ōmiya Kakusei"); 473. "Oomiya Awakens (part 2)" (大宮覚醒(後編) "Ōmiya Kakusei (Kōhen)"); 474. "Critical Moment" (崖っぷち "Gakeppuchi"); 475. "GT Wing (part 1)" (GTウイング "GT Uingu"); 476. "GT Wing (part 2)" (GTウイング(後編) "GT Uingu (Kōhen)"); 477. "Start of the Troubles" (波乱の幕開け "Haran no Makuake"); 478. "Side by Side (part 1)" (サイドバイサイド "Saido bai Saido"); 479. "Side by Side (part 2)" (サイドバイサイド(後編) "Saido bai Saido (Kōhen)"); 480. "Dead Line (part 1)" (デッドライン "Deddo Rain"); 481. "Dead Line (part 2)" (デッドライン(後編) "Deddo Rain (Kōhen)"); 482. "To the Finale!! (part 1)" (決着へ!! "Ketchaku he!!"); 483. "To the Finale!! (part 2)" (決着へ!!(後編) "Ketchaku he!! (Kōhen)"); 484. "The Second Line (part 1)" (第2のライン "Dai 2 no Rain"); 485. "The Second Line (part 2)" (第2のライン(後編) "Dai 2 no Rain (Kōhen)"); 486. "Let's go to the Beach" (海へ行こう "Umi he Ikō"); 487. "A Warrior's Break" (戦士の休息 "Senshi no Kyūsoku"); 488. "A Hair's Breadth" (間一髪 "Kanippatsu")
Trueno AE86 vs Roadster NB8C, Takumi handles avoiding an accident while he travels with Uehara Mika.
36	October 5, 2007	978-4-06-361598-2	April 17, 2019	—
489. "Yobisute" (よびすて "Yobisute"); 490. "Rollcage" (ロールケージ "Rōrukēji"); 491. "Mid Ship Specialist (part 1)" (ミッドシップスペシャリスト "Middoshippu Supesharisuto"); 492. "Mid Ship Specialist (part 2)" (ミッドシップスペシャリスト(後編) "Middoshippu Supesharisuto (Kōhen)"); 493. "Practice (part 1)" (プラクティス "Purakutisu"); 494. "Practice (part 2)" (プラクティス(後編) "Purakutisu (Kōhen)"); 495. "Takumi Strikes (part 1)" (拓海出撃 "Takumi Shutsugeki"); 496. "Takumi Strikes (part 2)" (拓海出撃(後編) "Takumi Shutsugeki (Kōhen)"); 497. "Opening Phase" (序盤戦 "Joban Sen"); 498. "Fujiwara Zone (part 1)" (藤原ゾーン "Fujiwara Zōn"); 499. "Fujiwara Zone (part 2)" (藤原ゾーン(後編) "Fujiwara Zōn (Kōhen)"); 500. "Middle of the Battle (part 1)" (中盤戦 "Chūban Sen"); 501. "Middle of the Battle (part 2)" (中盤戦(後編) "Chūban Sen (Kōhen)"); 502. "Artist of the Mountain Passes" (峠の職人 "Tōge no Shokunin")
Trueno AE86 vs MR-S ZZW30.
37	April 28, 2008	978-4-06-361664-4	April 17, 2019	—
503. "Ryosuke's Advive" (涼介の読み "Ryōsuke no Yomi"); 504. "The First Phase Rocket" (第一弾ロケット "Dai Ichi Dan Roketto"); 505. "Pro at Sprints" (スプリントのプロ "Supurinto no Puro"); 506. "Artist vs. Athlete (part 1)" (職人vs.アスリート "Shokunin vs. Asurīto"); 507. "Artist vs. Athlete (part 2)" (職人vs.アスリート(後編) "Shokunin vs. Asurīto (Kōhen)"); 508. "Phychological Battle (part 1)" (心理戦 "Shinri Sen"); 509. "Phychological Battle (part 2)" (心理戦(後編) "Shinri Sen (Kōhen)"); 510. "Braking Battle (part 1)" (ブレーキングバトル "Burēkingu Batoru"); 511. "Braking Battle (part 2)" (ブレーキングバトル(後編) "Burēkingu Batoru (Kōhen)"); 512. "The Last Situation (part 1)" (最終局面 "Saishū Kyokumen"); 513. "The Last Situation (part 2)" (最終局面(後編) "Saishū Kyokumen (Kōhen)"); 514. "The Remenants of Victory" (勝利の余韻 "Shōri no Yoin"); 515. "Keisuke Starts (part 1)" (啓介発進 "Keisuke Hasshin"); 516. "Keisuke Starts (part 2)" (啓介発進(後編) "Keisuke Hasshin (Kōhen)"); 517. "Orthodox Group (part 1)" (正統派 "Seitōha"); 518. "Orthodox Group (part 2)" (正統派(後編) "Seitōha (Kōhen)")
Trueno AE86 vs MR-S ZZW30, RX-7 FD3S vs Supra JZA80.
38	December 26, 2008	978-4-06-361723-8	April 17, 2019	—
519. "Expectation (part 1)" (予想 "Yosō"); 520. "Expectation (part 2)" (予想(後編) "Yosō (Kōhen)"); 521. "Intensive Training (part 1)" (特訓 "Tokkun"); 522. "Intensive Training (part 2)" (特訓(後編) "Tokkun (Kōhen)"); 523. "Growth (part 1)" (成長 "Seichō"); 524. "Growth (part 2)" (成長(後編) "Seichō (Kōhen)"); 525. "Silence Before The Storm (part 1)" (嵐の前の静けさ "Arashi no Mae no Shizukesa"); 526. "Silence Before The Storm (part 2)" (嵐の前の静けさ(後編) "Arashi no Mae no Shizukesa (Kōhen)"); 527. "Sound !! Gong of Duel (part 1)" (鳴らせ!!決闘のゴング "Narase!! Kettō no Gongu"); 528. "Sound !! Gong of Duel (part 2)" (鳴らせ!!決闘のゴング(後編) "Narase!! Kettō no Gongu (Kōhen)"); 529. "Gran Turismo (part 1)" (グランツーリスモ "Gurantsūrisumo"); 530. "Gran Turismo (part 2)" (グランツーリスモ(後編) "Gurantsūrisumo (Kōhen)"); 531. "Antagonistic" (拮抗 "Kikkō"); 532. "Keisuke's Impatience (part 1)" (啓介のあせり "Keisuke no Aseri"); 533. "Keisuke's Impatience (part 2)" (啓介のあせり(後編) "Keisuke no Aseri (Kōhen)"); 534. "Last Aspect (part 1)" (最終局面 "Saishū Kyokumen"); 535. "Last Aspect (part 2)" (最終局面(後編) "Saishū Kyokumen (Kōhen)"); 536. "End (part 1)" (終焉 "Shūen"); 537. "End (part 2)" (終焉(後編) "Shūen (Kōhen)")
RX-7 FD3S vs Supra JZA80.
39	July 6, 2009	978-4-06-361822-8	July 20, 2019	—
538. "Triumphal Return (part 1)" (凱旋 "Gaisen"); 539. "Triumphal Return (part 2)" (凱旋(後編) "Gaisen (Kōhen)"); 540. "Sympathy (part 1)" (シンパシー "Shimpashī"); 541. "Sympathy (part 2)" (シンパシー(後編) "Shimpashī (Kōhen)"); 542. "Shinigami (part 1)" (死神 "Shinigami"); 543. "Shinigami (part 2)" (死神(後編) "Shinigami (Kōhen)"); 544. "Connection (part 1)" (因縁 "Innen"); 545. "Connection (part 2)" (因縁(中編) "Innen (Chūhen)"); 546. "Connection (part 3)" (因縁(後編) "Innen (Kōhen)"); 547. "Professional D vs. Spiral (part 1)" (プロD VS. スパイラル "Puro D VS. Supairaru"); 548. "Professional D vs. Spiral (part 2)" (プロD VS. スパイラル(後編) "Puro D VS. Supairaru (Kōhen)"); 549. "The Fact That It Runs?" (走ることとは? "Hashiru Koto toha?"); 550. "Natural Material" (天然素材 "Tennen Sozai"); 551. "Wet Condition (part 1)" (ウェットコンディション "Wetto Kondishon"); 552. "Wet Condition (part 2)" (ウェットコンディション(後編) "Wetto Kondishon (Kōhen)"); 553. "Zero VS. Keisuke (part 1)" (ゼロVS.啓介!! "Zero VS. Keisuke!!"); 554. "Zero VS. Keisuke (part 2)" (ゼロVS.啓介!!(後編) "Zero VS. Keisuke!! (Kōhen)"); 555. "Mind of Nothing (part 1)" (無(ゼロ)の心 "Zero no Kokoro"); 556. "Mind of Nothing (part 2)" (無(ゼロ)の心(中編) "Zero no Kokoro (Chūhen)"); 557. "Mind of Nothing (part 3)" (無(ゼロ)の心(後編) "Zero no Kokoro (Kōhen)")
RX-7 FD3S vs Fairlady Z Z33.
40	December 26, 2009	978-4-06-361854-9	July 20, 2019	—
558. "Quiet the First Stage (part 1)" (静かなる序盤 "Shizuka Naru Joban"); 559. "Quiet the First Stage (part 2)" (静かなる序盤(後編） "Shizuka Naru Joban (Kōhen)"); 560. "Ryosuke Strategy (part 1)" (涼介の作戦 "Ryōsuke no Sakusen"); 561. "Ryosuke Strategy (part 2)" (涼介の作戦(後編) "Ryōsuke no Sakusen (Kōhen)"); 562. "White Devil (part 1)" (白い悪魔 "Shiroi Akuma"); 563. "White Devil (part 2)" (白い悪魔(後編) "Shiroi Akuma (Kōhen)"); 564. "Zero Theory vs. Fastest Public Roads Theory (part 1)" (ゼロ理論vs.公道最速理論 "Zero Riron vs. Kōdō Saisoku Riron"); 565. "Zero Theory vs. Fastest Public Roads Theory (part 2)" (ゼロ理論vs.公道最速理論(後編) "Zero Riron vs. Kōdō Saisoku Riron (Kōhen)"); 566. "Full Throttle (part 1)" (フルスロットル "Furu Surottoru"); 567. "Full Throttle (part 2)" (フルスロットル(後編) "Furu Surottoru (Kōhen)"); 568. "Defeat of Zero" (ゼロの敗北 "Zero no Haiboku"); 569. "Dangerous Downhill (part 1)" (危険なダウンヒル "Kiken na Daunhiru"); 570. "Dangerous Downhill (part 2)"" (危険なダウンヒル(後編) "Kiken na Daunhiru (Kōhen)"); 571. "White Wing" (白い羽 "Shiroi Hane"); 572. "Start of Acceleration (part 1)" (はじめの加速 "Hajime no Kasoku"); 573. "Start of Acceleration (part 2)" (はじめの加速(後編) "Hajime no Kasoku (Kōhen)"); 574. "Wings That Fly Over the Sky" (天駆ける翼 "Ten Kakeru Tsubasa"); 575. "Fujiwara Zone (part 1)" (藤原ゾーン "Fujiwara Zōn")
RX-7 FD3S vs Fairlady Z Z33, Trueno AE86 vs Silvia S15
41	August 6, 2010	978-4-06-361918-8	July 20, 2019	—
576. "Fujiwara Zone (part 2)" (藤原ゾーン(後編) "Fujiwara Zōn (Kōhen)"); 577. "Shinigami vs. Ryosuke (part 1)" (死神vs.涼介 "Shinigami vs. Ryōsuke"); 578. "Shinigami vs. Ryosuke (part 2)" (死神vs.涼介(後編) "Shinigami vs. Ryōsuke (Kōhen)"); 579. "Independent Action" (単独行動 "Tandoku Kōdō"); 580. "Confrontation of Fate Again (part 1)" (宿命の対決再び "Shukumei no Taiketsu Futatabi"); 581. "Confrontation of Fate Again (part 2)" (宿命の対決再び(後編) "Shukumei no Taiketsu Futatabi (Kōhen)"); 582. "Blank (part 1)" (ブランク "Buranku"); 583. "Blank (part 2)" (ブランク(後編) "Buranku (Kōhen)"); 584. "Unexpected Participation (part 1)" (意外な参戦 "Igai na Sansen"); 585. "Unexpected Participation (part 2)" (意外な参戦(後編) "Igai na Sansen (Kōhen)"); 586. "Charisma Awaking (part 1)" (カリスマ覚醒 "Karisuma Kakusei"); 587. "Charisma Awaking (part 2)" (カリスマ覚醒(後編) "Karisuma Kakusei (Kōhen)"); 588. "Dead or Alive (part 1)" (デッド・オア・アライブ "Deddo oa Araibu"); 589. "Dead or Alive (part 2)" (デッド・オア・アライブ(後編) "Deddo oa Araibu (Kōhen)"); 590. "Deadly Side Press (part 1)" (必殺のサイドプレス "Hissatsu no Saido Puresu"); 591. "Deadly Side Press (part 2)" (必殺のサイドプレス(後編) "Hissatsu no Saido Puresu (Kōhen)"); 592. "Abandonment (part 1)" (見切り "Mikiri"); 593. "Abandonment (part 2)" (見切り(後編) "Mikiri (Kōhen)")
RX-7 FC3S vs GT-R R32
42	January 6, 2011	978-4-06-361980-5	July 20, 2019	—
594. "Conflict" (葛藤 "Kattō"); 595. "Conflict (part.2)" (葛藤(後編) "Kattō (Kōhen)"); 596. "Accident" (異変 "Ihen"); 597. "Clash on the bridge" (橋の上の死闘 "Hashi no Ue no Shitō"); 598. "Understeer" (アンダーステア "Andāsutea"); 599. "Understeer (part.2)" (アンダーステア "Andāsutea (Kōhen)"); 600. "Reckless driving" (暴走 "Bōsō"); 601. "Reckless driving (part.2)" (暴走(後編) "Bōsō (Kōhen)"); 602. "Kaori" (かおり "Kaori"); 603. "Kaori (part.2)" (かおり(後編) "Kaori (Kōhen)"); 604. "End" (終結 "Shūketsu"); 605. "End (part.2)" (終結(後編) "Shūketsu (Kōhen)"); 606. "Anxiety" (不安 "Fuan"); 607. "Cannot strike it though i want to" (打ちたいけど打てない "Uchitai Kedo Utenai"); 608. "Cannot strike it though i want to (part.2)" (打ちたいけどうてない(後編) "Uchitai Kedo Utenai (Kōhen)"); 609. "Afterimage" (残像 "Zanzō"); 610. "Another natural(part 1)" (もうひとりの天然(ナチュラル) "Mōhitori no Natyuraru"); 611. "Another natural(part 2)" (もうひとりの天然(ナチュラル)(後編) "Mōhitori no Natyuraru (Kōhen)")
RX-7 FC3S vs GT-R R32
43	July 6, 2011	978-4-06-382048-5	July 20, 2019	—
612. "Older and younger brothers" (兄と弟 "Ani to Otōto"); 613. "Mother and child" (母と子 "Haha to Ko"); 614. "Mother and child (part.2)" (母と子(後編) "Haha to Ko (Kōhen)"); 615. "Practice" (プラクティス "Purakutisu"); 616. "Practice (part.2)" (プラクティス(後編) "Purakutisu (Kōhen)"); 617. "20% chance of success" (勝算20パーセント "Shōsan 20 Pāsento"); 618. "20% chance of success (part.2)" (勝算20パーセント(後編) "Shōsan 20 Pāsento (Kōhen)"); 619. "Heavy air" (重い空気 "Omoi Kūki"); 620. "Heavy air (part.2)" (重い空気(後編) "Omoi Kūki (Kōhen)"); 621. "Rest" (休息 "Kyūsoku"); 622. "Rest (part.2)" (休息(後編) "Kyūsoku (Kōhen)"); 623. "Advantage" (アドバンテージ "Adobantēji"); 624. "Running refusal" (出走拒否 "Shussō Kyohi"); 625. "Running refusal (part.2)" (出走拒否(後編) "Shussō Kyohi (Kōhen)"); 626. "HOJO brothers" (北条兄弟 "Hōjō Kyōdai"); 627. "HOJO brothers (part.2)" (北条兄弟(後編) "Hōjō Kyōdai (Kōhen)"); 628. "Leading NSX !!" (先行NSX!! "Senkō NSX!!"); 629. "Leading NSX !! (part.2)" (先行NSX!!(後編) "Senkō NSX!! (Kōhen)"); 630. "Common feature" (共通点 "Kyōtsūten")
RX-7 FD3S vs NSX
44	January 6, 2012	978-4-06-382123-9	July 20, 2019	—
631. "Common feature (part.2)" (共通点(後編) "Kyōtsūten (Kōhen)"); 632. "Go's awaking" (覚醒する豪 "Kakusē Suru Gō"); 633. "Go's awaking (part.2)" (覚醒する豪(後編) "Kakusē Suru Gō (Kōhen)"); 634. "Accelerating battle" (加速するバトル "Kasoku Suru Batoru"); 635. "Accelerating battle (part.2)" (加速するバトル(後編) "Kasoku Suru Batoru (Kōhen)"); 636. "Worried Shinji" (悩めるシンジ "Nayameru Shinji"); 637. "Worried Shinji (part.2)" (悩めるシンジ(後編) "Nayameru Shinji (Kōhen)"); 638. "Further acceleration" (さらなる加速 "Saranaru Kasoku"); 639. "Further acceleration (part.2)" (さらなる加速(後編) "Saranaru Kasoku (Kōhen)"); 640. "Nice miscalculation" (うれしい誤算 "Ureshī Gosan"); 641. "Nice miscalculation (part.2)" (うれしい誤算(後編) "Ureshī Gosan (Kōhen)"); 642. "Unexpected" (想定外 "Sōtēgai"); 643. "Unexpected (part.2)" (想定外(後編) "Sōtēgai (Kōhen)"); 644. "Kubo's Miscalculation" (久保の誤算 "Kubo no Gosan"); 645. "Kubo's Miscalculation (part.2)" (久保の誤算(後編) "Kubo no Gosan (Kōhen)"); 646. "Back to the source" (原点回帰 "Genten Kaiki"); 647. "Back to the source (part.2)" (原点回帰(後編) "Genten Kaiki (Kōhen)"); 648. "Synchronized" (シンクロ "Shinkuro"); 649. "Synchronized (part.2)" (シンクロ(後編) "Shinkuro (Kōhen)")
RX-7 FD3S vs NSX
45	June 6, 2012	978-4-06-382181-9	July 20, 2019	—
650. "Irritation" (焦燥 "Shōsō"); 651. "Irritation (part.2)" (焦燥(後編) "Shōsō (Kōhen)"); 652. "Hero" (ヒーロー "Hīrō"); 653. "Hero (part.2)" (ヒーロー(後編) "Hīrō (Kōhen)"); 654. "Rin's Real Intention" (凛の真意 "Rin no Shini"); 655. "Rin's Real Intention (part.2)" (凛の真意(後編) "Rin no Shini (Kōhen)"); 656. "Ringing the Battle Gong" (戦闘開始のゴング "Sentō Kaishi no Gongu"); 657. "Ringing the Battle Gong (part.2)" (戦闘開始のゴング(後編) "Sentō Kaishi no Gongu (Kōhen)"); 658. "Full Throttle" (フルスロットル "Furu Surottoru"); 659. "Full Throttle (part.2)" (フルスロットル(後編) "Furu Surottoru (Kōhen)"); 660. "Street Fight" (公道のケンカ "Kōdō no Kenka"); 661. "Street Fight (part.2)" (公道のケンカ(後編) "Kōdō no Kenka (Kōhen)"); 662. "Extreme Battle" (極限バトル "Kyokugen Batoru"); 663. "Extreme Battle (part.2)" (極限バトル(後編) "Kyokugen Batoru (Kōhen)"); 664. "Towards the End" (決着へ "Ketchaku he"); 665. "Towards the End (part.2)" (決着へ(後編) "Ketchaku he (Kōhen)"); 666. "Shinji's Start" (シンジ始動 "Shinji Shidō"); 667. "Afterglow" (余韻 "Yoin"); 668. "Takumi's Start" (拓海発進 "Takumi Hasshin")
RX-7 FD3S vs NSX
46	January 4, 2013	978-4-06-382256-4	July 20, 2019	—
669. "The Strongest of Foes" (最強の敵 "Saikyō no Teki"); 670. "The Strongest of Foes (Part 2)" (最強の敵(後編) "Saikyō no Teki (Kōhen)"); 671. "Pursuing Shinji" (先行するシンジを追え "Senkō Suru Shinji o oe"); 672. "Pursuing Shinji (Part 2)" (先行するシンジを追え(後編) "Senkō Suru Shinji o oe (Kōhen)"); 673. "Diverging Styles" (それぞれのスタイル "Sorezore no Sutairu"); 674. "Diverging Styles (Part 2)" (それぞれのスタイル(後編) "Sorezore no Sutairu (Kōhen)"); 675. "Memories From The Other Side" (逆走の原風景 "Gyakusō no Gen Fūkei"); 676. "Memories From The Other Side (Part 2)" (逆走の原風景(後編) "Gyakusō no Gen Fūkei (Kōhen)"); 677. "Shinji's Madness" (シンジの蛮行 "Shinji no Bankō"); 678. "Shinji's Madness (Part 2)" (シンジの蛮行(後編) "Shinji no Bankō (Kōhen)"); 679. "Chaos" (混乱 "Konran"); 680. "Chaos (Part 2)" (混乱(後編) "Konran (Kōhen)"); 681. "The Battle Accelerates" (加速するバトル "Kasoku Suru Batoru"); 682. "The Battle Accelerates (Part 2)" (加速するバトル(後編) "Kasoku Suru Batoru (Kōhen)"); 683. "Springing Into Action" (動きはじめるバトル "Ugoki Hajimeru Batoru"); 684. "Springing Into Action (Part 2)" (動きはじめるバトル(後編) "Ugoki Hajimeru Batoru (Kōhen)"); 685. "Shooting Him Down" (ねらいうち "Neraiuchi"); 686. "Shooting Him Down (Part 2)" (ねらいうち(後編) "Neraiuchi (Kōhen)"); 687. "Turning Point" (転機 "Tenki"); 688. "Turning Point (Part 2)" (転機(後編) "Tenki (Kōhen)")
AE86 3door vs AE86 2door
47	August 6, 2013	978-4-06-382344-8	July 20, 2019	—
689. "Can He Keep Up?!" (ついて来れるの!? "Tsuite Koreru no!?"); 690. "Can He Keep Up?! (Part 2)" (ついて来れるの!?(後編) "Tsuite Koreru no!? (Kōhen)"); 691. "Another Dimension" (別な次元 "Betsuna Jigen"); 692. "Another Dimension (Part 2)" (別な次元(後編) "Betsuna Jigen (Kōhen)"); 693. "In Sync" (同調 "Dōchō"); 694. "In Sync (Part 2)" (同調(後編） "Dōchō (Kōhen)"); 695. "Inferiority Complex" (自信喪失 "Jishin Sōshitsu"); 696. "Inferiority Complex (Part 2)" (自信喪失(後編) "Jishin Sōshitsu (Kōhen)"); 697. "Flashback" (回想 "Kaisō"); 698. "Sudden Shift" (急転 "Kyūten"); 699. "Sudden Shift (Part 2)" (急転(後編) "Kyūten (Kōhen)"); 700. "Passion" (情熱 "Jōnetsu"); 701. "Passion (Part 2)" (情熱(後編) "Jōnetsu (Kōhen)"); 702. "Terror" (恐怖心 "Kyōfu Shin"); 703. "Terror (Part 2)" (恐怖心(後編) "Kyōfu Shin (Kōhen)"); 704. "The No-Brake Method" (ノーブレーキ走法 "Nōburēki Sōhō"); 705. "The No-Brake Method (Part 2)" (ノーブレーキ走法(後編) "Nōburēki Sōhō (Kōhen)"); 706. "Understeer" (アンダーステア "Andāsutea"); 707. "Understeer (Part 2)" (アンダーステア(後編) "Andāsutea (Kōhen)"); 708. "Against The Wall" (絶体絶命 "Zettaizetsumei")
AE86 3door vs AE86 2door
48	November 6, 2013	978-4-06-382377-6	July 20, 2019	—
709. "Against The Wall (Part 2)" (絶体絶命(後編) "Zettaizetsumei (Kōhen)"); 710. "Abyss Of Despair" (絶望の淵 "Zetsubō no Fuchi"); 711. "Abyss Of Despair (Part 2)" (絶望の淵(後編) "Zetsubō no Fuchi (Kōhen)"); 712. "On The Brink" (土俵際 "Dohyōgiwa"); 713. "On The Brink (Part 2)" (土俵際(後編) "Dohyōgiwa (Kōhen)"); 714. "Final Corner" (最終コーナー "Saishū Kōnā"); 715. "Final Corner (Part 2)" (最終コーナー(後編) "Saishū Kōnā (Kōhen)"); 716. "The Glorious Finish" (栄光のゴール "Eikō no Gōru"); 717. "The Glorious Finish (Part 2)" (栄光のゴール(後編) "Eikō no Gōru (Kōhen)"); 718. "The Wrap Party" (解散式 "Kaisan Shiki"); 719. "Dreams" (ＤＲＥＡＭ(夢) "DREAM (Yume)"); Extra Story "Beyond Impact Blue" (番外編 インパクトブルーの彼方に "Bangai-hen Inpakutoburū no Kanata ni"); Extra Story "Beyond Impact Blue (Part 2)" (番外編 インパクトブルーの彼方に(後編) "Bangai-hen Inpakutoburū no Kanata ni (Kōhen)"); Extra Story "Takumi Side Story" (番外編 拓海外伝 "Bangai-hen Takumi Gaiden")
AE86 3door vs AE86 2door
