= De Barry (surname) =

De Barry is a surname, and may refer to:

- David de Barry, 5th Viscount Buttevant (1550–1617), Irish peer
- James de Barry, 4th Viscount Buttevant (1520–1581), Irish peer
- Nicolas de Barry (born 1948), French perfumer
- Paul de Barry(1587–1661), French Jesuit and writer
- Philip de Barry (fl.1183), Cambro-Norman soldier in Ireland
- Robert de Barry (fl.1175), Cambro-Norman soldier in Ireland
- Thomas de Barry (fl. 1560), canon of Glasgow and magistrate

== See also ==
- Barry (surname)
- Du Barry
- De Bary (surname)
- De Barry family
