= Baree, Son of Kazan =

1917 novel by James Oliver Curwood

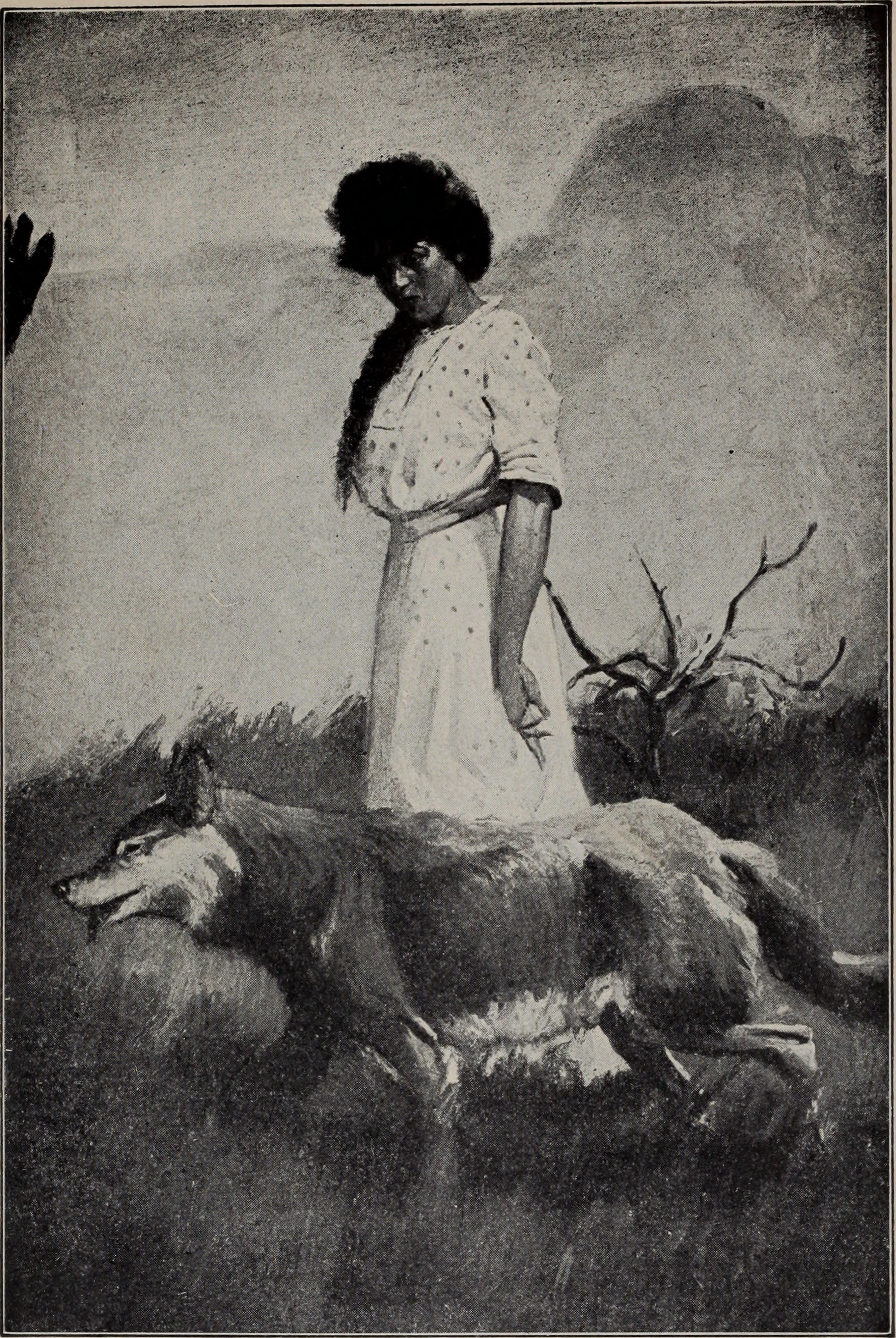
- Illustration from 1917 edition
- Author: James Oliver Curwood
- Publisher: Grosset & Dunlap, NY
- Publication date: 1917 First Edition
- Pages: 303
- Preceded by: Kazan

Baree, Son of Kazan (1917) is an American novel by James Oliver Curwood. About a wild wolfdog pup who bonds with a girl living with her trapper father on the frontier, it is the sequel to Kazan.

== Plot ==
Baree, Son of Kazan is a novel about a wild wolfdog pup sired by Kazan (1/4 wolf, 3/4 dog) and born of blind Greywolf (pure wolf). It explores Baree's survival after he is separated as a young pup from his parents. He eventually is cared for by Nepeese and her father Pierrot, a trapper.

He bonds with Nepeese, and the novel develops from there. James Oliver Curwood took the well-used "a boy and his dog" formula, and created a great adventure story about a girl and her dog. He used this theme of a strong heroine, rather than a male hero, in many of his stories.

== Films ==
The novel was adapted as a film, Baree, Son of Kazan (1918), starring Nell Shipman as Nepeese. In 1925 David Smith directed a revised film version by the same title, starring Anita Stewart.

== See also ==
- Curwood, James Oliver (1917), Baree: Son of Kazan, New York: Grosset & Dunlap, full scanned text on the Internet Archive
