= Di Bari =

Di Bari, or da Bari, is an Italian toponymic surname for someone from the Italian city Bari. Notable people with the name include:

- Benedetto da Bari (12th–13th century), Italian Benedictine monk
- Majone di Bari (died 1160), anglicized as Maio of Bari, third of the great admirals of Sicily
- Martina Di Bari (born 2002), Italian footballer
- Nicola Di Bari (born 1940), Italian singer-songwriter and actor
- S Nicola di Bari (270–343), a name of Saint Nicholas, early Christian bishop
- Vito Di Bari (born 1983), Italian footballer

== See also ==
- Bari (surname)
