= De Bary (surname) =

de Bary is a surname, and may refer to:

- Amy-Cathérine de Bary (born 1944), Swiss equestrian
- August de Bary (1874–1954), German physician and politician from Frankfurt
- Heinrich Anton de Bary (1831–1888), German scientist
- Jakob Erckrath de Bary (1864–1938), German fencer
- William Theodore de Bary (1919–2017), American sinologist and East Asian studies expert

== See also ==
- de Barry (surname)
