= Takane no Hana =

Japanese manga series

- First 'tankōbon volume cover, featuring Hana Takane

高嶺の花
- Genre: Romance
- Manga
- Written by: Shuichi Shigeno
- Published by: Kodansha
- Magazine: Weekly Young Magazine
- Original run: March 10, 2014 – October 27, 2014
- Volumes: 2
- icon

Takane no Hana (高嶺の花; lit. 'Amazing Hana') is a Japanese manga series written and illustrated by Shuichi Shigeno. It was serialized in Kodansha's seinen manga magazine Weekly Young Magazine from March to October 2014.

== Publication ==
Written and illustrated by Shuichi Shigeno, Takane no Hana was serialized in Kodansha's seinen manga magazine Weekly Young Magazine from March 10 to October 27, 2014. Kodansha collected its chapters in two 'tankōbon volumes, released on November 6 and December 5, 2014.

=== Volumes ===
| No. | Release date | ISBN |
|---|---|---|
| 1 | November 6, 2014 | 978-4-06-382532-9 |
| 2 | December 5, 2014 | 978-4-06-382555-8 |
