= Bari (name) =

Bari is both a surname and a given name. Notable people with the name include:

== Surname ==
- Bari (surname)
- Maio of Bari, admiral of Sicily
- Melus of Bari, Lombard nobleman from the Apulian town of Bari

== Given name ==
- Bari Goddard, Welsh artist, photographer and musician
- Bari Imam, Shah Abdul Latif Kazmi Great Muslim Sufi Saint
- Bari Morgan (born 1980), Welsh footballer
- Bari Weiss (born 1984), American non-fiction writer and editor
- Bari Wood (born 1936), American author

== See also ==
- Abd al-Bari, an Arabic given name
