= Al-Bari' =

One of the names of God in Islam

Al-Bari' written in Arabic

Al-Bari' or Bari' (Arabic: البارئ) is one of the names of God (Arabic: Allah) in Islam, meaning "The Originator."

In Islam, God is the originator who created life and innovated everything out of nothing. Al-Bari' is derived from the Arabic root word "B-R-'", which conveys the idea of bringing something into existence from nothing. In the context of Allah being Al-Bari', it emphasizes the divine act of innovation and creation ex nihilo, meaning creation "out of nothing." This attribute highlights God's absolute power and authority over the cosmos, as Allah is the sole Originator who can bring forth existence without any pre-existing material.

While Al-Khaliq, another name of God in Islam, also refers to the Creator, Al-Bari' introduces a distinctive aspect. Al-Bari' emphasizes the act of creation and the perfection and flawlessness of God's creations. The name suggests that Allah's creative process is not only about bringing things into existence but doing so with absolute perfection, devoid of any deformity, mistakes, shortcomings, or incompatibilities.

== Al-Bari' in the Quran ==
هُوَ ٱللَّهُ ٱلْخَٰلِقُ ٱلْبَارِئُ ٱلْمُصَوِّرُ ۖ لَهُ ٱلْأَسْمَآءُ ٱلْحُسْنَىٰ ۚ يُسَبِّحُ لَهُۥ مَا فِى ٱلسَّمَٰوَٰتِ وَٱلْأَرْضِ ۖ وَهُوَ ٱلْعَزِيزُ ٱلْحَكِيمُ

He is Allah, the Creator, the Inventor (Al-Bari'), the Fashioner; to Him belong the best names. Whatever is in the heavens and earth is exalting Him. And He is the Exalted in Might, the Wise.

— Quran 59:24 [Sahih International]

== See also ==
- Names of God in Islam
- Abd al-Bari
- Beri'ah
