= Sailor Ace =

Japanese manga series

- First tankōbon volume cover

セーラーエース (Sērā Ēsu)
- Genre: Sports
- Manga
- Written by: Shuichi Shigeno
- Published by: Kodansha
- Imprint: Young Magazine KC
- Magazine: Weekly Young Magazine
- Original run: June 1, 2015 – April 3, 2017
- Volumes: 6
- icon

Sailor Ace (Japanese: セーラーエース, Hepburn: Sērā Ēsu) is a Japanese baseball-themed manga series written and illustrated by Shuichi Shigeno. It was serialized in Kodansha's seinen manga magazine Weekly Young Magazine from June 2015 to April 2017, with its chapters collected in six tankōbon volumes.

== Plot ==
High school pitcher Mayu Sakuragi returns to Kanto Girls' Academy's baseball team after a five-month absence. Though captain Airi Takahata welcomes her back, cleanup hitter Kasumi Kimura challenges Mayu to prove herself. Mayu's dominant pitching and leadership immediately boost team morale.

After crushing their practice match, the team enters the Fall Tournament seeking revenge against powerhouse Aoyama Intercontinental High School. They overcome early challenges, including first-year Mariko Yamada's emotional breakdown during a game against her ex-boyfriend's school, where Mayu's relief pitching sparks a comeback.

Mayu pushes through illness to pitch in a critical game, collapsing after securing victory. In the quarterfinals against Aoyama ICH, Kanto's strong start forces their ace Mariko Messenger into the game, setting the stage for a decisive showdown.

== Publication ==
Written and illustrated by Shuichi Shigeno, Sailor Ace was serialized in Kodansha's seinen manga magazine Weekly Young Magazine from June 1, 2015, to April 3, 2017. Kodansha collected its chapters in six tankōbon volumes, released from November 6, 2015, to May 7, 2020.

=== Volumes ===
No.	Release date	ISBN
1	November 6, 2015	978-4-06-382702-6
2	January 6, 2016	978-4-06-382726-2
3	June 6, 2016	978-4-06-382775-0
4	October 6, 2016	978-4-06-382871-9
5	February 6, 2017	978-4-06-382926-6
6	June 6, 2017	978-4-06-382976-1
