= De Bary =

De Bary may refer to:

- DeBary, Florida, city in the United States
- De Barry family, noble family of Cambro-Norman origins
- de Bary (surname)
