= Helen Valeska Bary =

American suffragist

- Born: 1888
- Died: June 22, 1973 (aged 84–85)
- Occupation: Social reformer
- Known for: Suffragist

Helen Valeska Bary (1888 - June 22, 1973) was an American suffragist and helped establish the U.S. government social welfare administration. She campaigned for suffrage at the state and local level. In 1914, she worked for the California Industrial Welfare Commission investigating the working conditions of women laundry workers, which she wrote about in her report, "The Employment of Women and Minors in the Laundry Industry of California" in 1917. Shortly after World War I, she worked in Porto Rico for the Federal Children's Bureau as a researcher and social reformer, reporting on the living conditions of indigent and homeless children on the island. In her 1921 paper, "The Trend of Child Welfare Work", published in the North American Review, Bary wrote, "The greatest enemy of childhood has been the fatalistic complacency with which every phase of child life has been regarded". Bary worked for the federal Social Security Board (SSB) since its inception in 1935 during the Great Depression. She worked there until 1948, representing the SSB in western states, helping them to develop social welfare reform plans in order to receive federal money. Shortly before her death in 1973, Bary was one of twelve women interviewed by Jacqueline Parker for her work on the Suffragist Oral History Project for the UC Berkeley Oral History Center, "in order to document their activities in behalf of passage of the Nineteenth Amendment and their continuing careers as leaders of movements for welfare and labor reform, world peace, and the passage of the Equal Rights Amendment".

== See also ==
- List of suffragists and suffragettes
