= August de Bary =

German pediatrician (1874–1954)

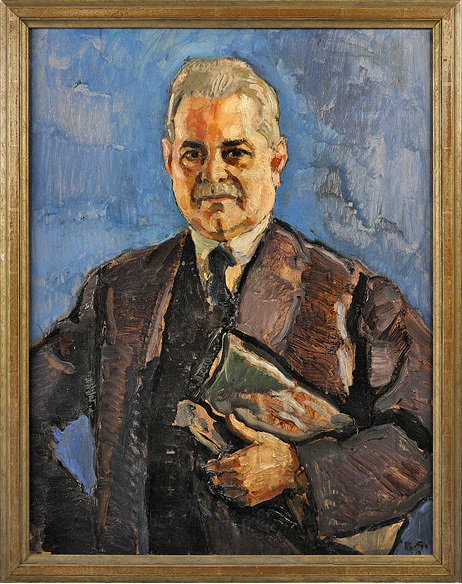

August Georg Ludwig de Bary (17 February 1874, in Frankfurt am Main – 10 October 1954) was a German physician and politician in Frankfurt.

He served as Chief Physician at the Clementine Children's Hospital in Hospital from 1912 to 1928, and was chairman of the medical association in Hesse-Nassau from 1928 to 1933. He was director of the Citizen's Hospital in Frankfurt from 1933 to 1953. He was also chairman of the board of Dr. Senckenbergische Stiftung. He was a council member in Frankfurt from 1948 to 1952 and a board member of the German Hospital Association from 1949 to 1952.

== Honours ==
- 1953: Officer's Cross of the Order of Merit of the Federal Republic of Germany
