= Shuichi Shigeno =

Japanese manga artist

Shuichi Shigeno しげの 秀一
- Born: March 8, 1958 (age 68) Matsunoyama, Japan
- Notable works: Initial D
- Awards: Kodansha Manga Award in shōnen, 1985

Shuichi Shigeno (重野 秀一, Shigeno Shūichi; pen name: しげの 秀一; born March 8, 1958) is a Japanese manga artist famous for creating Initial D. Shigeno has also created Bari Bari Densetsu, Dopkan, and Tunnel Nuketara Sky Blue ("First Love in Summer"). In 1985, he received the Kodansha Manga Award in shōnen for Bari Bari Densetsu.

== Early life ==
Shuichi Shigeno was born in Matsunoyama, Tokamachi City, Niigata Prefecture. When Shigeno was in high school, he was obsessed with motorcycles, which resulted in one of his best-selling series, Bari Bari Densetsu. Before Shigeno became a manga artist, he was a poor student. Still, after Baribari Densetsu sold well and got a lot of money from royalties on the first edition, he bought his first car (Toyota AE86) and lived in a small apartment.

== Career ==
After Bari Bari Densetsu was sold, Shigeno wanted to make another book. And one of Shigeno's friends told Shigeno he liked cars, "so why not write it down?" Shigeno thought about the idea, but part of him resisted, due to going out of business if writing about cars had not worked out. Since Shigeno was writing about cars, he used his first car, the Toyota AE86, to help him write Initial D. After Initial D was published, it became a huge hit.

In 2017, after Initial D was completed, he started a sequel series titled MF Ghost, which continues most of Initial D's legacy in focusing on racing theories and cars. In November 2022, Weekly Young Magazine announced that MF Ghost would be on a hiatus due to Shigeno's declining health to prevent him from overworking. The series resumed on June 19, 2023, and concluded on February 16, 2025.

== Works ==
- Bari Bari Densetsu (1983–1991, serialized in Weekly Shōnen Magazine, Kodansha)
- Tunnel Nuketara Sky*Blue (1992, serialized in Weekly Young Magazine, Kodansha)
- Shō (1992, serialized in Weekly Shōnen Magazine, Kodansha)
- DO-P-KAN (1993–1995, serialized in Weekly Young Magazine, Kodansha)
- Initial D (1995–2013, serialized in Weekly Young Magazine, Kodansha)
- Takane no Hana (2014, serialized in Weekly Young Magazine, Kodansha)
- Sailor Ace (2015–2017, serialized in Weekly Young Magazine, Kodansha)
- MF Ghost (2017–2025, serialized in Weekly Young Magazine, Kodansha)
- Subaru and Subaru (from 2025, serialized in Weekly Young Magazine, Kodansha)
