= Bari (caste) =

Caste in India

Bari caste is one of the Hindu castes in India. The people of Bari caste are mostly spread across Northern India.

Their traditional occupation was making leaf plates for temples. They are described by Russel & Hiralal as household servants for kings and makers of leaf plates for temples, from whom Brahmins accept water. They practice Hindu rituals and worship Surya. In the Hindu caste system hierarchy, they are considered as a clean caste but not of high status.

Bari is listed among Other Backward Class (OBC) in Orissa and has presence in districts of Sundergarh, Khurda, Balasore. The Bari residing in Orissa mostly speak Bhojpuri language. They are also listed as OBC in Madhya Pradesh, Rajasthan. Maharashtra, Uttar Pradesh, Bihar, Jharkhand, and Chhattisgarh.
