= Thomas de Barry =

Thomas de Barry (fl. 1560), was canon of Glasgow, and chief magistrate of Bothwell.

He wrote a poem on the Battle of Otterburn, the greater part of which is quoted in the eighteenth century editions of Fordun's ‘Scotichronicon.’ Dempster suggests that he likely thrived in 1560 and may be the same individual as the Thomas de Barry, a presbyter and notary, whose name appears in the 'Registrum Episcopalis Glasguensis' from 1503.
