= Bari, Nigeria =

Bari is a densely populated town in Rogo Local Government Area in Kano State, Nigeria created many years ago, from the old Kano Karaye Local Government.

The postal code of the area is 704. Among popular economic and commercial activities in Bari are farming, fishing, and other commercial undertakings. It contains Dutsen Bari Hill from which it got its name.
