= Abdul Bari (Taliban commander, Uruzgan) =

Alleged Taliban commander

Mullah Abdul Bari (died April 1, 2009) was alleged to be a Taliban commander, and expert bomb-maker.

According to Australian General Mark Evans:

- "His weapons of choice were roadside bombs and suicide bombers and his death means that Taliban insurgents operating in the region have lost one of their key facilitators."
- "Mullah Bari has also been confirmed to have been directly involved in the placement of the improvised explosive devices which have targeted Australian troops."

Another Taliban commander named Mullah Abdul Bari was reported killed in Helmand Province on February 21, 2008.
