= Amina Bari =

Bangladeshi politician

3rd Jatiya Sangsad

Member of the Bangladesh Parliament for Reserved Women's Seat-18
- In office 1986–1988

Personal details
- Died: 2018
- Party: Jatiya Party (Ershad)

Amina Bari (Bengali: আমিনা বারী) was a Jatiya Party (Ershad) politician and member of the Bangladesh Parliament from a reserved women's seat.

== Career ==
Bari was elected to parliament from a reserved women's seat as a Jatiya Party candidate in 1986. She died in 2018.
