= Aima Bari =

Coordinates: 33°02′N 73°42′E

Aima Bari is a small village located near Kala Depot in Dina Tehsil of Jhelum District in the Punjab Province of Pakistan.

== History ==
Its full name is Aima Syed Abdul Bari, after its founder who settled there in late 18th century and whose tomb is in the village. Both the number of buildings and population of the village increased during the 1990s.

== population ==
The population is approximately 500 with the majority of the residents belonging to the Naqvi Syed caste. The village is made up of approximately 100 houses predominantly in an architectural style mix of neo-classical and early renaissance.

The most notable feature of the populace is the high level of education; It is often said even the old women are fluent in at least two European languages. There is a substantial number of post doctoral research fellows amongst the modern generation.

Some of the popular past times include philately, trainspotting, theology and daily geo-political debating.
