= Bari, Iran =

Bari or Bary (Persian: باري) in Iran may refer to:

- Bari, East Azerbaijan
- Bari, Zanjan
- Bari, West Azerbaijan
