= Baree, Son of Kazan (1918 film) =

1918 silent film by David Smith

- Directed by: David Smith
- Based on: Baree, Son of Kazan by James Oliver Curwood
- Cinematography: Charles R. Seeling
- Distributed by: Vitagraph Company of America
- Release date: May 27, 1918
- Running time: 50 minutes; five reels (4,271 feet)
- Country: United States
- Language: Silent (English intertitles)

Baree, Son of Kazan is a 1918 American silent film based on the 1917 adventure novel of the same name by writer James Oliver Curwood. The film was directed by David Smith, the brother of Albert E. Smith, one of the founders of Vitagraph studio. Nell Shipman, an influential female actress and producer, stars in the film. In 1925, David Smith produced a new film based on this novel, starring Anita Stewart.

An incomplete or abridged version of the film survives.

== Plot ==
As described in a 1918 film magazine, McTaggart, a factor of the Lac Bain trading post, is infatuated by Nepeese, daughter of trapper Perriot, a trapper, but is rejected by the girl. On his journey to Perriot's cabin, he trapped a wolfdog pup, whose enmity he aroused by his poor treatment.

Nepeese befriends the animal, which she names Baree. McTaggart visits and, stung by the girl's continued rejection, attacks her. Baree springs to her defense but is shot by the factor. Nepeese's father Pierrot returns and grapples with McTaggart but is shot to death. Nepeese flees and, pursued by McTaggart, jumps over a cliff.

Baree, abandoned, wanders the north country, but has not forgotten his hatred for McTaggart. The factor traps the wolfdog again, now grown, and leaves it to die. Baree is rescued by outlaw Jim Carvel. Homesick, Baree leads his new friend to his former home and is overjoyed to find Nepeese. Learning that she has returned, McTaggart enters her tent at midnight. The wolfdog attacks and kills him, avenging the wrongs done.

== Cast ==
- Nell Shipman as Nepeese
- Gayne Whitman as Jim Carvel
- Al Ernest Garcia as 'Bush' McTaggart
- Joe Rickson as Perriot

== Production ==
For a scene using a 30 foot feet-first jump into water a stuntwoman was used for Shipman, but she was pregnant so Shipman did the stunt in her place on the condition that the stuntwoman was still paid. A black horse with papier-mâché horns was used as a moose and Alaskan Malamutes were used for wolves.

== Reception ==
Curwood's adventure books were popular and films based on them were well received.

But in this period, city and state film censorship boards often made cuts before allowing screening of films within their jurisdictions. Like many American films of the time, Baree, Son of Kazan was subject to restrictions and cuts that reduced the violence between the men, attacks on Nepeese, and the sexual suggestiveness of the factor toward her.

For example, the Chicago Board of Censors cut, in Reel 2, the intertitle "I guess I'm about through with you"; and made numerous cuts in Reel 4: all but the first and last fight scenes between McTaggart and Nepeese, where he suggestively leers at her; reduces the length by half of the fight scenes between men, cuts the shooting of Perriot, cut all struggle scenes except first and last, the intertitle "From now on you belong to me", and the arson scene.

== Works cited ==
- Armatage, Kay (2003). The Girl from God's Country: Nell Shipman and the Silent Cinema. University of Toronto Press. ISBN 9781442681378.
