= Gwen Bari =

American singer

Gwen Bari (born Ruth L. Von Hagen; December 22, 1918, in Philadelphia – November 6, 2000) was an American jazz singer. Although she recorded little, Bari performed in clubs for sixty years.

== Early years ==
Gwen Bari was born Ruth L. Von Hagen in Philadelphia, Pennsylvania in 1918, to Frederick Von Hagen and Estella M. Von Hagen. With sister Estella Marie, she lived with her mother at her grandfather Samuel Rinehart's house in Chester, Delaware Co. Frederick died in 1927. Ruth's mother was a member of the Chester School Board.

She learned violin at age 5 and piano at age 7 (her mother Estelle was a piano teacher). Voice training followed at Temple University under Henry Gurney, and she sang locally with the Chester Symphony Orchestra, the First Baptist Church Choir, and the Bala-Cynwyd Women's Club. After graduating from Chester High School in 1934, she received a scholarship to the Juilliard School in New York City and studied under Paul Reimers. In 1938 she performed in Swarthmore, Pennsylvania near her hometown of Chester, where she sang Wilson's Carmena and the Jewel Aria from Gounod's Faust at the Annual New Year's Players Club Reception Concert with the Swarthmore Symphony Orchestra.

While studying opera at Juilliard in New York, and modeling bathing suits and stockings to support herself, an opportunity came up to sing at an Italian restaurant. Discovering her preference for the night-life as opposed to opera, Bari went on to play piano and sing in a variety of hotel clubs and lounges: the Glass Hat Room (Belmont Plaza Hotel), Manhattan Room (Hotel New Yorker), Hotel Fifth Avenue, e.g. - under the name of Gwen Gary.

== Performance and recordings ==
In 1941, performing in Palm Springs, Florida, she met violinist Gene Bari; they married that same year and began to perform professionally as Gene and Gwen Bari. The couple stopped performing for 4 years while Gene, pursuant to his draft, completed military training. Upon her return to show business, Bari spent the decade of 1945-1955 playing clubs and lounges across the US. During 1956 and 1957 she made appearances in Europe and Asia as part of a Hollywood celebrity friendship tour abroad, including a command performance for Generalissimo Chiang Kai-shek in Formosa.

Bari's legacy as a live lounge entertainer from 1936 to 1997 – inspired by Hildegarde - exceeds her recorded output. While articles (her hometown Chester Times, e.g.) extolled her original song writing capabilities, 10,000 tune live repertoire, radio and TV appearances, and 10 albums in the 1950s, only 2 LP albums exist to her credit from 1951 and 1958; there is mention of a proposed 1963 LP that never materialized. The Gwen Bari Trio has a single musical vocal credit in 1951 with Tex Beneke's Orchestra on a tune called "The Yodel Waltz." From the 1930s to the 1990s Bari performed in night clubs across the US, South America, Europe, China, Japan, Indonesia and Indo-China, and in multiple languages. From the 1950s, her act included a poodle costumed and with props like miniature pianos and candelabras. Bari's obituary states that, among other things, she worked in Hollywood in the 1950s dubbing songs for Warner Bros., Paramount, Fox and MGM studios.

A short 1951 Telescriptions film is referenced (MP1428) of a performance of Lanny Ross with the Gwen Bari Singers. Bari ultimately settled in Fort Lauderdale, Florida, where she performed in clubs such as Pier 66, The Moonraker, the Diplomat in Hollywood and the Eden Roc in Miami Beach. She co-founded the Broward Musicians Association and was the accompanist and arranger for the Broward Women's Chorus for nine years before opening Those Were the Days, a Lighthouse Point dinner club, in 1997.

== Personal life ==
In early performances Ruth adopted the pseudonym Gwen Gary, and became Gwen Bari after her marriage to Gene Bari in 1941; they divorced in 1955 and had no children.

In 1998 Bari suffered a stroke that left her paralyzed on her right side and with little ability to speak. She died on November 6, 2000, at Palm Courts nursing home in Wilton Manors. Her husband at the time of her death was Jerry Darlington.

== Discography ==
- Intimately Yours (Courtney 732, 1961)

=== As guest ===
- Tex Beneke, The Yodel Waltz (MGM, 1951)

=== With accompaniment ===
- Gwen Bari, The Ken Jones Quartet, ...And So To Bed (Fontana TFL 5018, 1958)
