= Bari Assembly constituency =

Bari Assembly constituency may refer to

- Bari, Odisha Assembly constituency
- Bari, Rajasthan Assembly constituency
