= Bari Bari Densetsu =

Japanese manga series and media franchise

- Cover of the first tankōbon volume, featuring Gun Koma

バリバリ伝説 (Baribari Densetsu)
- Manga
- Written by: Shuichi Shigeno
- Published by: Kodansha
- Imprint: Magazine KC
- Magazine: Weekly Shōnen Magazine
- Original run: March 9, 1983 – July 17, 1991
- Volumes: 38
- Original video animation

Bari Bari Densetsu Part I: Tsukuba; Bari Bari Densetsu Part II: Suzuka
- Directed by: Osamu Uemura (1); Yō Ikegami (2); Hisayuki Toriumi (supervision)
- Produced by: Sōsaku Miki (1); Takao Igarashi (2); Ryōhei Suzuki; Yuji Nunokawa
- Written by: Yūji Watanabe; Mami Watanabe (2)
- Music by: Ichirō Nitta
- Studio: Pierrot
- Released: May 10, 1986 – December 16, 1986
- Runtime: 50 minutes (1); 54 minutes (2)
- Episodes: 2
- Video game
- Publisher: Pony Canyon
- Platform: FM-7
- Released: August 1985
- Video game
- Developer: Taito
- Publisher: Taito
- Platform: TurboGrafx-16
- Released: November 29, 1989

Bari Bari Densetsu (Japanese: バリバリ伝説, Hepburn: Bari Bari Densetsu; lit. 'Vroom Vroom Legend') is a Japanese motorbike racing-themed manga series written and illustrated by Shuichi Shigeno. It was serialized in Kodansha's shōnen manga magazine Weekly Shōnen Magazine from 1983 to 1991, with its chapters collected in 38 tankōbon volumes.

Earlier parts of the story focus both on high school life as well as street racing. At first the characters are illegal street racers (Japanese: hashiriya) that race on public roads, particularly on the winding mountain roads known as tōge. Those kind of racers were called "rolling-zoku", a type of bōsōzoku, and were seen as a social problem in Japan. Later parts of the story revolve around professional motorcycle racing events held on road circuits like the All Japan Road Race Championship.

== Plot ==
Gun Koma, a high school student with a passion for motorcycles, begins as a street racer riding on mountain roads with his friends and rivals. As he competes in illegal street races, Gun develops his riding skills and becomes determined to become a professional racer. During this time, he also begins a relationship with Ai Itou, and their relationship develops alongside his racing career.

Gun's career progresses when he enters official competitions, including endurance races such as the Suzuka 4-Hour Endurance Race, where he must work together with his rival Hideyoshi Hijiri as teammates. As he continues racing, the story shifts to professional circuit racing, following Gun as he competes in the All Japan Road Race Championship and later advances to international competition in the Road Racing World Championship.

Over time, Gun competes against stronger rivals, culminating in his participation in the GP500 class world championship as he strives to become world champion.

== Characters ==
Gun Koma (巨摩 郡, Koma Gun)
Voiced by: Hideyuki Tanaka
A motorcycle racer, he rides a Honda CB750 as well as a Suzuki GSX-R.
Ai Itou (伊藤 歩惟, Itō Ai)
Voiced by: Yōko Oginome
Gun's girlfriend.
Hideyoshi Hijiri (聖 秀吉, Hijiri Hideyoshi)
Voiced by: Ryūsei Nakao
Gun's friendly rival, he rides a Suzuki Katana.
Hiro Okita (沖田 比呂, Okita Hiro)
Voiced by: Issei Futamata
Gun's best friend, he rides a Kawasaki Z400GP.
Miyuki Ichinose (一ノ瀬 美由紀, Ichinose Miyuki)
Voiced by: Keiko Toda
The daughter of the Ichinose Racing Team president, she is in love with Hiro and rides a Honda VT250F.
Tomoyo Hijiri (聖 知代, Hijiri Tomoyo)
Voiced by: Akiko Hiramatsu
Hideyoshi's sister, she lost her parents in car accident.

== Media ==
=== Manga ===
Written and illustrated by Shuichi Shigeno, Bari Bari Densetsu was serialized in Kodansha's Weekly Shōnen Magazine from March 9, 1983, to July 17, 1991. Kodansha collected its chapters in thirty-eight tankōbon volumes, released from October 14, 1983, to August 6, 1991.

==== Volume list ====
No.	Release date	ISBN
1	October 14, 1983	978-4-06-172922-3
2	November 14, 1983	978-4-06-172932-2
3	December 12, 1983	978-4-06-172937-7
4	March 15, 1984	978-4-06-172955-1
5	May 15, 1984	978-4-06-172970-4
6	July 16, 1984	978-4-06-172977-3
7	September 13, 1984	978-4-06-172990-2
8	December 10, 1984	978-4-06-173010-6
9	February 12, 1985	978-4-06-173022-9
10	May 14, 1985	978-4-06-173044-1
11	July 10, 1985	978-4-06-173053-3
12	November 14, 1985	978-4-06-173085-4
13	February 12, 1986	978-4-06-173120-2
14	July 10, 1986	978-4-06-173155-4
15	September 10, 1986	978-4-06-173176-9
16	November 13, 1986	978-4-06-173190-5
17	February 10, 1987	978-4-06-311211-5
18	May 11, 1987	978-4-06-311236-8
19	July 10, 1987	978-4-06-311256-6
20	September 7, 1987	978-4-06-311273-3
21	November 9, 1987	978-4-06-311291-7
22	February 8, 1988	978-4-06-311312-9
23	May 2, 1988	978-4-06-311342-6
24	July 8, 1988	978-4-06-311361-7
25	October 11, 1988	978-4-06-311387-7
26	February 10, 1989	978-4-06-311419-5
27	April 12, 1989	978-4-06-311436-2
28	July 13, 1989	978-4-06-311465-2
29	October 11, 1989	978-4-06-311490-4
30	February 8, 1990	978-4-06-311525-3
31	April 14, 1990	978-4-06-311548-2
32	June 14, 1990	978-4-06-311569-7
33	August 11, 1990	978-4-06-311587-1
34	November 15, 1990	978-4-06-311613-7
35	February 14, 1991	978-4-06-311637-3
36	April 15, 1991	978-4-06-311655-7
37	June 10, 1991	978-4-06-311675-5
38	August 6, 1991	978-4-06-311705-9

=== OVA ===
A two-episode original video animation (OVA) adaptation produced by Pierrot, Part I: Tsukuba and Part II: Suzuka, was released in 1986. The episodes were later re-edited and released in theaters in August 1987 by Nippon Herald (now part of Kadokawa Pictures).

A Blu-Ray version was released in Japan on July 21, 2023.

=== Video games ===
Two video games were released:

- Bari Bari Densetsu - FM-7 (1985)
- Bari Bari Densetsu - TurboGrafx-16 (1989)

Gun Koma also appears as a guest character in Namco's MotoGP (2000) video game, based on the 1999 season.

== Reception ==
In 1985, it won the ninth Kodansha Manga Award for the shōnen category. As of April 2018, collected tankōbon volumes of the Bari Bari Densetsu manga series had over 26 million copies in circulation.

Japanese motorcycle racer Shinya Nakano credited his use of the number 56 throughout his career to Gun Koma also using the same number in the road racing portions of the manga.
