= Farzana Bari =

Pakistani human rights activist

- فرزانہ باری
- Born: Farzana Bari; 7 March 1957 (age 69)
- Education: University of Sussex, United Kingdom
- Occupations: Academic, Ex-director Gender studies department Quaid-i-Azam University Islamabad
- Known for: Human Rights Activist, Feminist, Member Awami Workers Party

Farzana Bari (Urdu: فرزانہ باری, born 7 March 1957) is a Pakistani feminist, human rights activist and academic who served as the director of the Gender Studies Department at Quaid-i-Azam University, Islamabad Pakistan.

== Career ==
Bari is a leading voice on issues of women's rights in Pakistan, with more than twenty five years of academic and professional experience in the field of gender studies. She holds a Ph.D. degree in Sociology from University of Sussex, United Kingdom, with a doctoral thesis on "Effects of Employment on the Status of Women within Family." She is also active in policy advice and advocacy on women's economic, political and social empowerment in society. She also did research on "Women’s Substantive Representation in Pakistani Politics." She is founder of the first gender studies department in any university in Pakistan.

== Feminism/human rights activism ==
Farzana Bari is human rights activist who promotes justice and gender equality in Pakistan. She militates against the male-dominated system of jirgas and pleads in favor of looser Islamic rules regarding women's rights in Pakistan.

In 2013, Bari estimated that at least eleven million women were not eligible to vote because authorities did not issued them the national identity card numbers. In January 2014, she militated to reopen the Kohistan dancing video case where she claimed that the girls appearing in the video were then murdered after dancing at a wedding. In August 2015, she spoke up about the 300 children sex slaves in Hussain Khan Wala Village (Kasu) forced to do sex videos from 2006 to 2014. In May 2016, she strongly opposed the Islamic council's decision to make it legal for husbands to "slightly" beat up their wives, calling the council "decadent".

Bari raised her voice against the honor killings of women in Pakistan. In October 2016, as the National Assembly of Pakistan outlawed honor killing, Farzana Bari warned that this law could be bypassed as a judge has to decide first and foremost if a homicide is indeed a case of honor killing or not.

== Politics ==
Bari also served as a senior leader and vice president of Awami Workers Party (AWP). She joined AWP since it was formed in 2012. She was elected as women secretary AWP in party's third central congress held in Lahore on 12-13 March.

== Articles ==
Bari also wrote many articles as a columnist for The Express Tribune and Daily Times Pakistan.

- Women Parliamentarians: Challenging the Frontiers of Politics in Pakistan, March 2011
