= Bari, Himachal Pradesh =

Bari
- Village
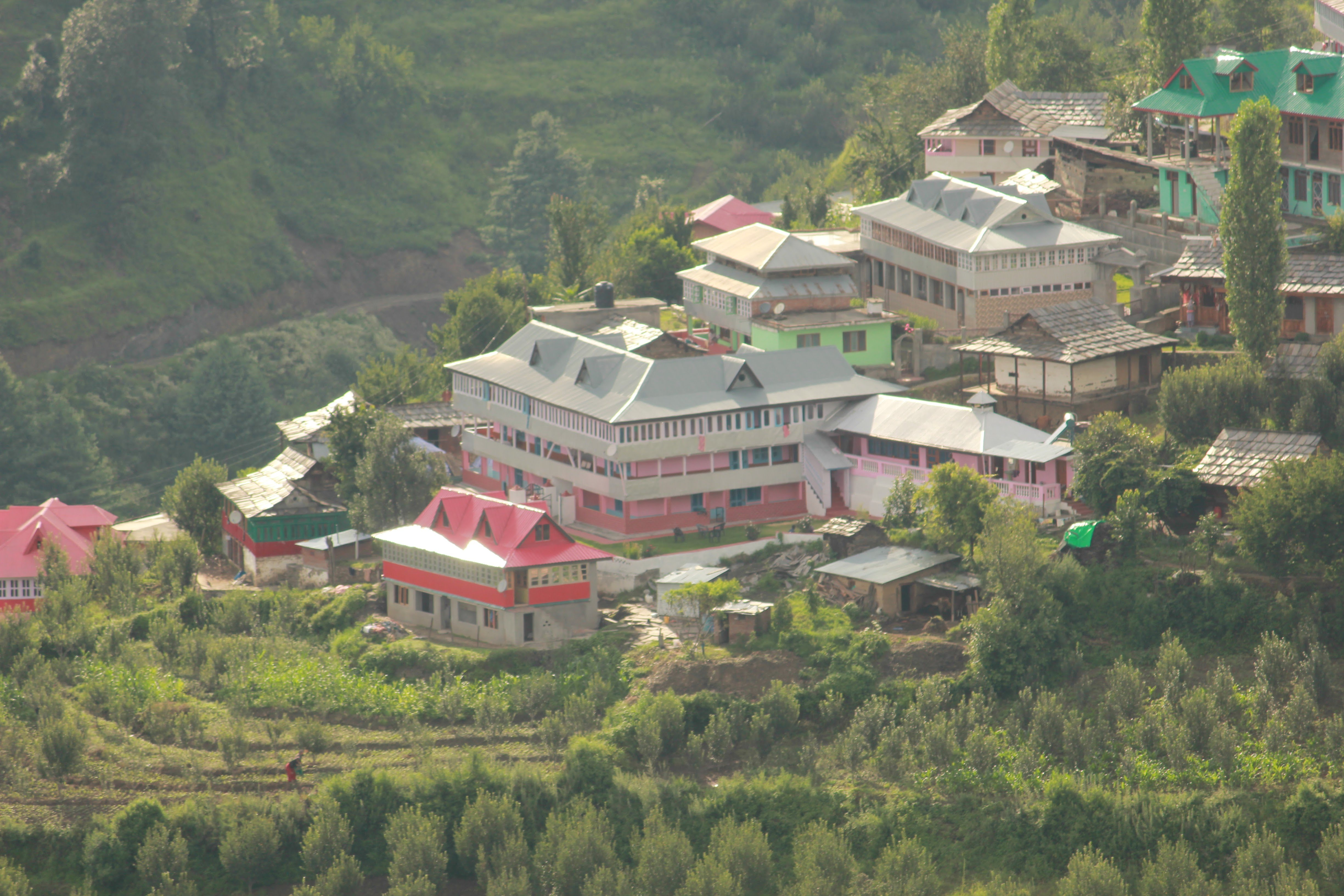

- Location within Himachal Pradesh Location within India
- Country: India
- State: Himachal Pradesh
- District: Shimla

Area
  - Total: 2.18 km^{2} (0.84 sq mi)

Population (2011)
  - Total: 323
  - Density: 148/km^{2} (384/sq mi)

Languages
  - Official: Hindi
  - Regional: Mahasu Pahari (Kochi)
- Time zone: UTC+5:30 (IST)
- PIN: 171207
- Vehicle registration: HP 10
- literacy rate: 65.02
- Sex ratio: 1.1

Bari is a village in Rohru sub-district in Shimla district of Himachal Pradesh state, India.

According to 2011 Census of India, Bari had 75 families, and its population was 323, of which 169 were males while 154 were females. Population of children between age group of 0–6 was 37, which made up 11.46% of the total population. Average sex ratio and child sex ratio were 1.1 and 1.31 respectively. Its literacy rate was 65.02%. Male literacy stood at 71.6% while female literacy rate was 57.8%. Bari village had substantial population of scheduled castes. They constituted 27.25 % of the total population. The village did not have any scheduled tribe population.

Total area of Bari was 2.18 km^{2}, per 2011 Census of India. There were 206 workers in the village, out of which 47.09% were main workers while 52.91% were marginal workers. Out of the main workers, 61 were cultivators while 18 were agricultural laborer. Bari's PIN code is 171207 and its postal head office is Rohru.
