= Regina Bari-Nagy =

Hungarian handball player (born 1990)

Personal information
- Full name: Regina Bari-Nagy
- Nationality: Hungarian
- Born: 15 September 1990 (age 36) Budapest, Hungary
- Height: 1.63 m (5 ft 4 in)

Sport
- Sport: Handball
- Position: Right Wing
- Current club: Retired

Youth career
- Years: Team
- 2005–2008: Ferencvárosi TC

Senior clubs
- Years: Team
- 2008–2011: Ferencvárosi TC
- 2011–2012: TuS Metzingen

Regina Bari-Nagy (born 15 September 1990 in Budapest) is a retired Hungarian handballer.

== Achievements ==
- Nemzeti Bajnokság I:
  - Silver Medallist: 2009
  - Bronze Medallist: 2011
- Magyar Kupa:
  - Silver Medallist: 2010
- EHF Cup Winners' Cup:
  - Winner: 2011
