= Vala Rud =

Village in Zanjan province, Iran

Vala Rud Persian: والارود
- Village
- Location within Iran
- Coordinates: 36°42′27″N 48°22′03″E
- Country: Iran
- Province: Zanjan
- County: Zanjan
- District: Central
- Rural District: Zanjanrud-e Bala

Population (2016)
  - Total: 521
- Time zone: UTC+3:30 (IRST)

Vala Rud (Persian: والارود) (Note: Also romanized as Vālā Rūd; also known as Bārī (باري), Baro, and Bārow) is a village in Zanjanrud-e Bala Rural District of the Central District in Zanjan County, Zanjan province, Iran.

== Demographics ==
=== Population ===
At the time of the 2006 National Census, the village's population was 482 in 127 households. The following census in 2011 counted 472 people in 128 households. The 2016 census measured the population of the village as 521 people in 163 households.
