= Baree, Son of Kazan (1925 film) =

1925 film

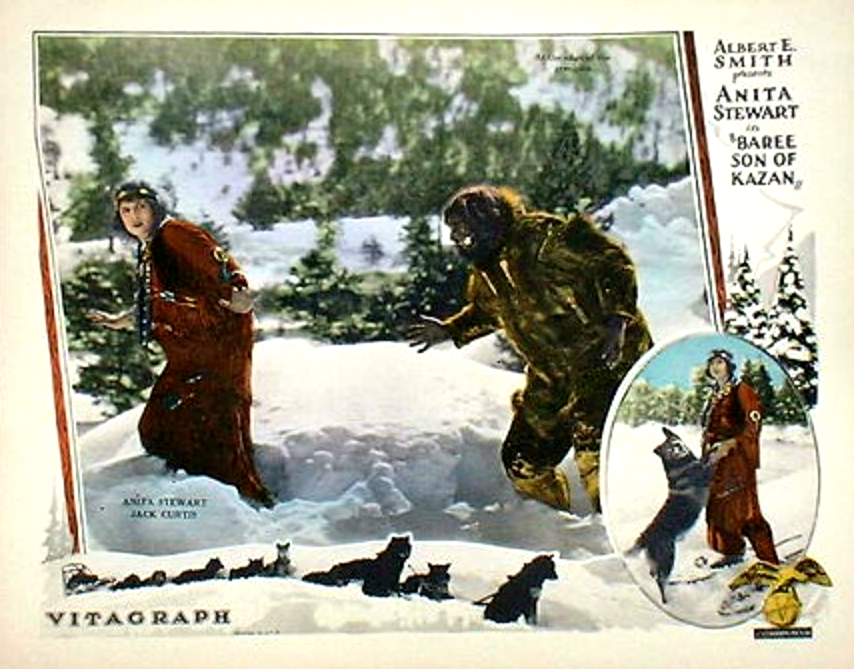
- Lobby card
- Directed by: David Smith
- Written by: Jay Pilcher
- Produced by: Albert E. Smith
- Starring: Anita Stewart
- Cinematography: Steve Smith; David Smith
- Production company: Vitagraph
- Distributed by: Warner Bros.
- Release date: April 19, 1925 (Limited)
- Running time: 7 reels; 6,893 ft.
- Country: United States
- Language: Silent (English intertitles)

Baree, Son of Kazan is a 1925 American silent drama film produced by the Vitagraph Company of America and distributed by Warner Bros., which acquired Vitagraph. It was based on a 1917 novel by James Oliver Curwood. The film starred Anita Stewart and is a remake of a 1918 version starring Nell Shipman.

== Plot ==
As described in a film magazine review, evading the police, Jim Carvel tramps north, where he makes friends with Baree, a pup. He falls from a cliff and is rescued by Pierre and his daughter, Nepeese. Bush McTaggart desires the young woman and, in a fight over her, Pierre is killed and Baree is shot. Nepeese is rescued and takes refuge with an Indian. Later, Carvel returns and saves Baree from death in one of McTaggart's traps. He is led to Nepeese by the dog. When McTaggart makes one final effort to possess the young woman, Baree attacks the man and takes his life.

== Cast ==
- Anita Stewart as Nepeese
- Donald Keith as Jim Carvel
- Jack Curtis as Bush McTaggart
- Joe Rickson as Pierre Eustach
- Wolf as Baree

== Preservation ==
With no prints of Baree, Son of Kazan located in any film archives, it is a lost film.
