= Abdul Bari (Taliban commander, Helmand) =

Alleged Taliban commander

Mullah Abdul Bari was alleged to be a Taliban commander. He is reported to have been killed with 29 other fighters. However, Abdul-Bari survived and in fact was imprisoned in Pakistan from 2008 to 2013. He was released in 2013 after a galling stint and promoted to command the Helmand military front. The released Abdul-Bari was at the time confused with another Abdul-Bari Agha, who had been governor during the 1990s.

Mullah Noormal, a Taliban commander involved in the Taliban's successful capture of Musa Qala, told Asia Times that Abdul Bari was in overall command of the attack.

Another Taliban commander named Mullah Abdul Bari was reported killed in Uruzgan Province on April 1, 2009.
