= Chiridota albatrossii =

Conservation status
- Secure (NatureServe)

Scientific classification
- Kingdom: Animalia
- Phylum: Echinodermata
- Class: Holothuroidea
- Order: Apodida
- Family: Chiridotidae
- Genus: Chiridota
- Species: C. albatrossii

Binomial name
- Chiridota albatrossii Edwards, 1907

Species of sea cucumber

Chiridota albatrossii, commonly known as the Albatross footless sea cucumber, jellybean sea cucumber, or holothurie de l'Albatross, is a species of sea cucumber native to the North Pacific Ocean, including the waters of the Russian Far East, northern Japan, western Canada, and Alaska. First collected by the steamship Albatross in 1903, it was described by Charles Lincoln Edwards in 1907.

== Taxonomy and history ==
Chiridota albatrossii was described by American zoologist Charles Lincoln Edwards in 1907 based on specimens collected by the United States Bureau of Fisheries steamship Albatross during a 1903 investigation into Alaskan salmon stocks. Edwards noted this new species was similar to Chiridota laevis but could be differentiated by its larger size and the structure of the ossicles. The description C. albatrossii was included alongside discussion of the other sea cucumber specimens collected by the Albatross in a scientific paper published in the Proceedings of the United States National Museum. The type is held in the collection of the United States National Museum. C. albatrossii was first collected from the north-western Pacific Ocean during another expedition of the Albatross in the summer of 1906.

== Distribution and habitat ==
Chiridota albatrossii is known from the Northern Pacific Ocean in the sublittoral to bathyal zones at depths of 46–1,000 m (151–3,281 ft). This range includes the waters of western Canada, northern Japan, eastern Russia, and the north-western United States (Alaska). In the east of its range off western North America it is known from Queen Charlotte Sound and off Vancouver Island in Canada and from Behm Canal, Boca de Quadra, Naha Bay, and Clarence Strait in Alaska. In the west of its range in Japan and Russia it is known from southern Sakhalin (Aniva Bay and Cape Patience), the Nemuro Strait, Kunashir Island, Rebun Island, and on the eastern and southern shores of Hokkaido.
