= William Kitchen Parker =

British Professor of Anatomy

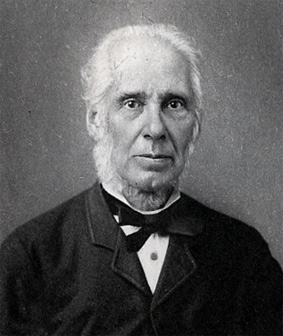
William Kitchen Parker

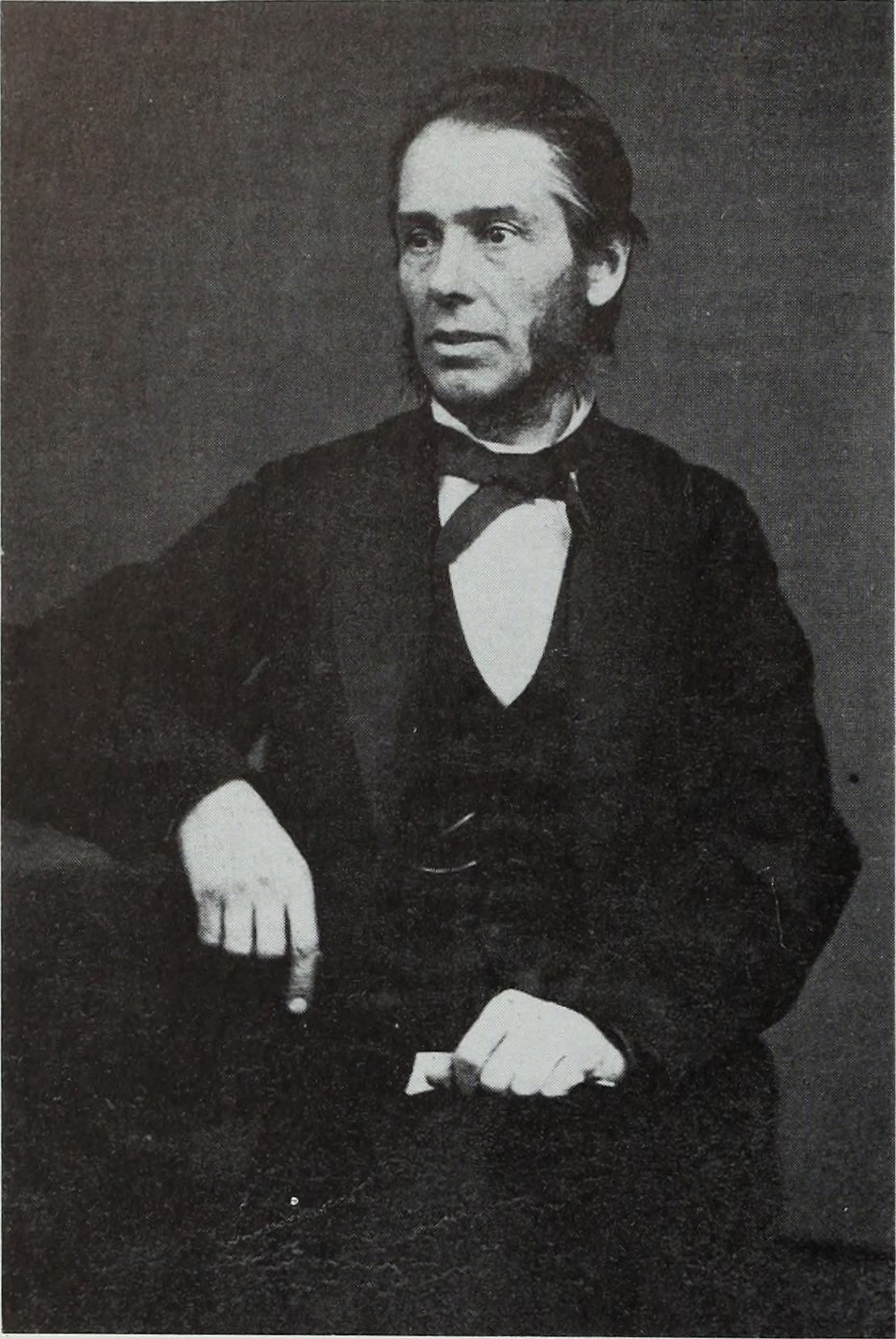
undated image of William Kitchen Parker

William Kitchen Parker FRS FRMS (23 June 1823 – 3 July 1890) was a British physician, zoologist and comparative anatomist. From a humble beginning he became Hunterian Professor of Anatomy and Physiology in the College of Surgeons of England.

He was elected a Fellow of the Royal Society in 1865, awarded the Royal Medal in 1866. From 1871 to 1873 he was President of the Royal Microscopical Society, and in 1885 he received the Baly Medal of the Royal College of Physicians.

== Life ==
Parker was born in the village of Dogsthorpe, near Peterborough in the County of Northamptonshire. His father, Thomas Parker, was a working farmer, living in a thatched house, built in 1635. Thomas was a Wesleyan of the old school: a Methodist-Churchman, God-fearing and courteous, farming his own land. He married the daughter of another farmer, Sarah Kitchen, whose name was also given to their son William.

William Parker was the second son, and six other children in the family died in their infancy. He went to a village dame school early in life, then to parish schools in Werrington and Paston. Schooling was interspersed with farm-work.

After telling his father that farm work was not for him, Parker entered the Peterborough Grammar School for nine months, and then started on the road to medical education. He was articled to a surgeon at Market Overton in 1842, using his spare time to teach himself about the plants of the neighbourhood. His knowledge of botany became remarkably extensive and accurate.

In 1842 he became apprenticed to a country surgeon. During this time he continued educating himself in natural history by reading, looking and doing. The doing consisted of collecting and dissecting birds and mammals, and working up a portfolio of exquisitely beautiful and accurate drawings.

Parker married Elizabeth Jeffery whilst still a student: she was the daughter of the clerk to the Vauxhall Bridge Company. Her mother was the sister of Joseph Prendergast DD (1791–1875), the Headmaster of Colfe's School (1831–1857), and the benefactor of Prendergast School, both in the borough of Lewisham.

William and Elizabeth had seven children, three daughters and four sons. The first son, Thomas Jeffery Parker, became Professor of Zoology and Comparative Anatomy in the University of Otago, New Zealand; the second, William Newton Parker, became Professor of Biology in the University College, Cardiff; the third was a draughtsman and lithographer; the fourth was a surgeon. In his work on the vertebrate skull Parker became close to Thomas Henry Huxley, and named one of his sons after him. His first son was sent to study under Huxley, and became in 1872 one of Huxley's demonstrators.

Parker was elected FRS in 1865, and a few years afterwards the Royal Society gave him an annual grant to aid his work, and a generous Wesleyan friend more than once presented £100 towards the cost of publishing some of his plates. Later in life a State pension was awarded.

The honours and appointments Parker gained later in life were due mainly for his work on the vertebrate skeleton and its significance in establishing a "true theory of the vertebrate skull" (Edward Sabine). His Royal Society obituary notice described him as "An unworldly seeker after truth, loved by all who knew him". He is buried in a Wandsworth Cemetery under a cross of red granite.

== Medical training ==
Parker studied at King's College London from 1844 to 1846, and became a student-demonstrator there to Mr (later Sir) William Bowman, the surgeon, histologist and anatomist. He attended Charing Cross Hospital in 1846–47. He never took notes during lectures, but drew sketches, and claimed he remembered the facts as well as anyone who took notes. He produced sheet after sheet of artistic drawing, all worthy of publication and large numbers of skeletons of birds and mammals. He attended Richard Owen's lectures at the College of Surgeons, and "received with enthusiasm the doctrine of the archetype which he was afterwards to do so much to overturn".

Parker avoided taking exams, and remained for many years with the minimum qualification for running a general medical practice, which in those days was an LSA (Licenciate of the Society of Apothecaries), a qualification of the Worshipful Society of Apothecaries. From 1849, Parker ran a general practice in London for many years, at various locations. The income supported his family, but his interest was in zoology, at which he was entirely self-taught. Today he is remembered only as a zoologist, one of a quite a sizeable group – including Thomas Henry Huxley, Richard Owen and Joseph Dalton Hooker – who were qualified in medicine but whose life work was in natural history or one of the newly named biological sciences.

== Career in zoology ==
=== Forams ===
Introduced to the microscope during his medical studies, Parker continued to study the microscopic structure of tissues. It was on a visit to Bognor collecting sand that he encountered Polyzoa and Foraminifera, which he sorted, mounted and studied. Parker became one of the greatest authorities on the Foraminifera, a group containing microscopic single-celled amoeboid protists with calcareous tests (shells). Had he not met Rupert Jones and Crawford Williamson he might have remained an unpublished amateur. It was Jones, mainly, who taught him how to present his considerable knowledge, and together they wrote 34 papers on the forams.

=== Morphology of birds ===
At the same time, Parker worked on his dissections, preparations and skeletons of vertebrates, especially birds. He developed, for example, about 300 preparations of bird wings and many complete skeletons. This work resulted in 24 papers on birds, including one on Archaeopteryx. There is a general article on birds in Encyclopædia Britannica, 9th ed.

=== Owen's concept of vertebrate anatomy ===
Richard Owen was one of Parker's teachers, yet Parker would overthrow the master's ideas. Owen's view on anatomy did not derive from evolution, but from German philosophical notions of idealism. These ideas, associated in biology with Goethe and Kant, and developed in anatomy by Lorenz Oken (1779-1851) and Georges Cuvier (1769-1832), were used by Owen in his theoretical expositions. Vertebrate anatomy, in this scheme, was seen as variations on an archetype.

From an idea of Goethe's in 1790, Oken developed a theory that the bones of the skull were four modified vertebrae. Oken made the memorable exaggeration: "The entire man is only a vertebra". Oken's ideas were revived and expanded by Owen, and presented to the British Association meeting in 1846.

Owen's theory had a weak point: it relied solely on more derived and specialised skulls, and even so it took no notice of their embryological development. For example, Owen made no reference to the work of Martin Rathke, who had shown in 1839 that there was no sign of the four vertebrae in the early embryo of snakes.

==== The assault on Owen's system ====
Huxley initiated the attack on Owen's ideas on the vertebrate skeleton in his Croonian Lecture to the Royal Society in 1858. He showed from a study of the early stages of lower fish, and also of the stickleback and the frog, that the segmentation of the skull in higher vertebrata is a secondary process, independent of vertebration. The basis of the work was embryology, but the early history of the skull was known in only a few species.

Parker had the distinction of carrying out a careful study of the process of skull development in a much wider variety of vertebrates; his ironic comment on the "anatomical suffering caused to fish from their being dragged into harmony with that mischievous piece of work, the vertebrate archetype" shows, from such a gentle man, a surprising vigour in debate. "It is high time for us to have ceased from transcendentalism: of what use is it?" he asked.

==== Parker on the vertebrate skull ====
From 1865 to 1888 Parker published 36 studies on the vertebrate skull, including a monograph . The entire series comprises nearly 1800 pages of letterpress and about 270 plates. The work was summarised in Francis Balfour's Comparative Embryology of 1881, and settled the fate of Owen's transcendental archetype theory of the vertebrate skull once and for all.

==== The vertebrate shoulder-girdle ====
Another major vertebrate project by Parker resulted in a monograph on the comparative anatomy of the vertebrate shoulder-girdle (pectoral girdle). As a major result of this work, by demonstrating the true homologies of the various bones of the shoulder-girdle in fishes, Parker overthrew Owen's theory of the nature of limbs. Parker showed (contrary to Owen) that the true shoulder-girdle is from the first totally independent of the skull. In teleost and ganoid fish, the skull and shoulder-girdle are brought into connexion by derivatives of the skin-skeleton, not by bones of the shoulder-girdle. Discoveries like this alerted Parker to the failure of the great system of transcendental anatomy which Owen had done so much to establish.

=== Royal College of Surgeons ===
In 1873, Professor Flower was invalided, and Parker was asked to step in the breach. He took his MRCS diploma by viva voce, and was appointed Professor. Afterwards, they shared the Hunterian chair jointly.

=== Difficulty in writing ===
There are many indications that Parker found writing difficult, and avoided it, and when forced to write the result was often scarcely comprehensible. Whatever the reason, he needed, and got, help and advice. Huxley gave him detailed advice more than once, which Parker either ignored or could not put into action.

"He wrote without system, putting down everything as it occurred to him, and continually going off on side issues. He never revised: it was always the first draft of his MS. that went to the printer, and none but minor alterations were made in proof; and such methods of assisting the reader as abstracts, careful descriptions of figures, etc., always seemed to him superfluous."

"But from the purely literary standpoint the case is altered: scattered up and down his writings are passages of great beauty, of true and sincere eloquence, and of quaint whimsical humour."

Although Parker could scarcely write a simple descriptive sentence to save his life, he certainly had a huge grasp of the imagery and poetics of the English language. This is part of one sequence quoted by his son:

"If the Megatherium, or his somewhat more modest-sized relation, the Mylodon (another extinct sloth), did find their supply of food in the way palaeontologists suggest, their mode of dining must have been a sight worth seeing...
"Let us, however, try to imagine a Megatherium waking up after lazily dozing a month or two during the dry season, and then, hungry and wet, in the heavy downpour of the beginning rainy season, setting to work to break his fast. As far as can be judged by the tools he had to work with—paws a yard, and claws a foot, in length—the first thing to be done was to throw a few hundredweights of earth from the roots of some large tree.
"Now he changes his tactics; he has good collar-bones, and well-shaped arms for embracing; so, bear-like, he hugs the tree upon which his desires are set, and, busily digging still, not now with his fore, but with his hind, paws, his great weight resting upon his haunches and his tail, he, with many groans, sways the big tree to and fro; at last with a great crash it falls..."

That is certainly not the prose of the usual science author. At least two of Parker's books were written with help: his Morphology of the skull was written from his dictation and notes by G.T. Bettany, and his 1884 lectures On mammalian descent were written with the help of a friend, Arabella Buckley, who had been Charles Lyell's secretary.

Parker's avoidance of exams also points towards an avoidance of writing, especially since his early career would have been much improved by taking a higher qualification. As far as we know, it was not a lack of money which prevented him taking exams (as it was with Huxley). His father, though not wealthy, was able to give his children a start in life.

Dyslexia is a possible explanation, but it is hard to reconcile with passages such as the above. Perhaps an upbringing in a farmhouse with little reading material apart from the Bible, and little opportunity to practice writing in his early years led to his unusual characteristics as a scientific writer.
