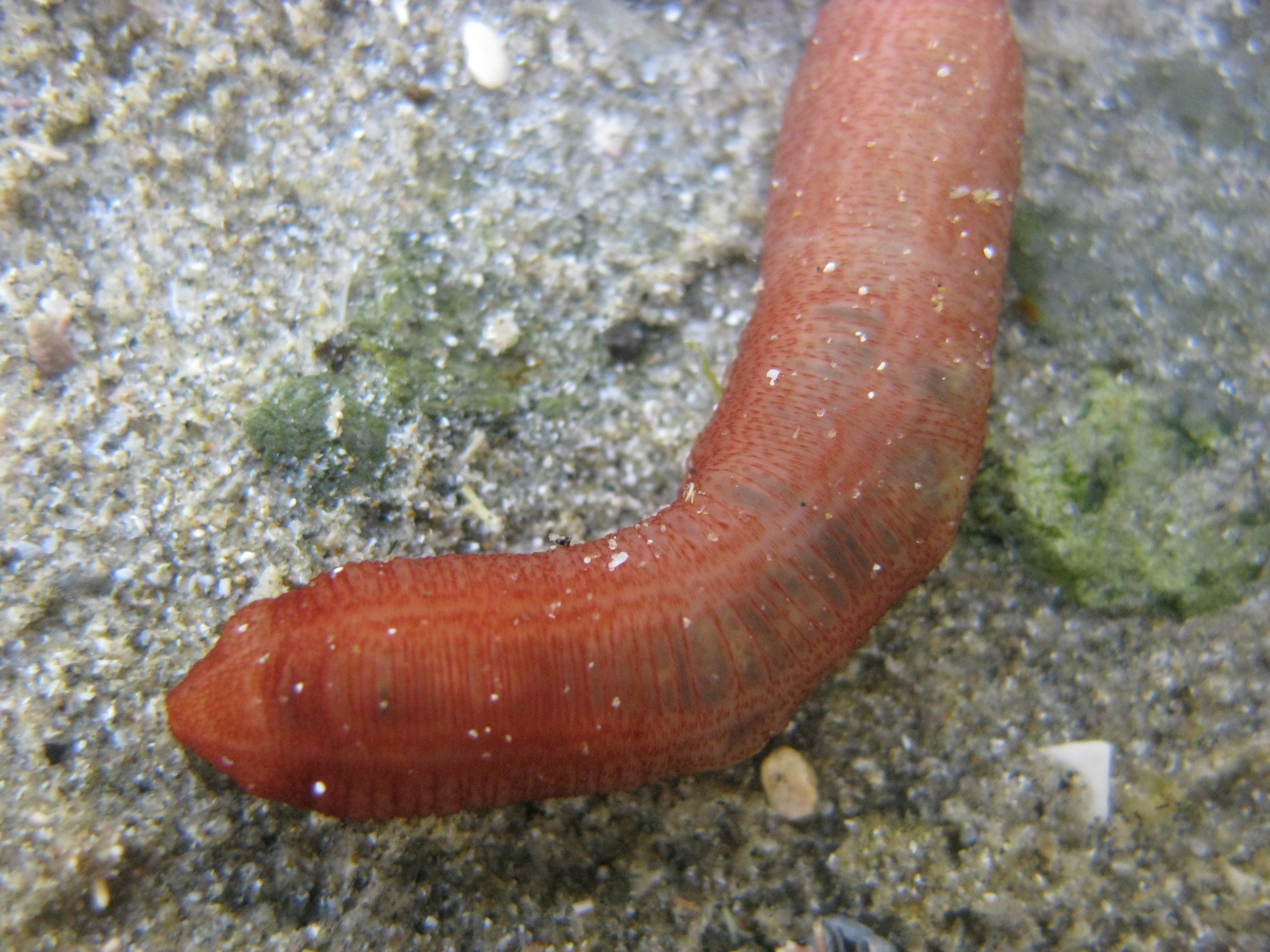

Scientific classification
- Kingdom: Animalia
- Phylum: Echinodermata
- Class: Holothuroidea
- Order: Apodida
- Family: Chiridotidae
- Genus: Taeniogyrus
- Species: T. dunedinensis

Binomial name
- Taeniogyrus dunedinensis Parker, 1881

Synonyms
- Taeniogyrus benhami Dendy, 1909; Chirodota dunedinensis Parker, 1881; Chirodota benhami Dendy, 1909; Chirodota geminifera Dendy & Hindle, 1907; Trochodota dunedinensis Parker, 1881; Trochodota benhami Dendy, 1909

= Taeniogyrus dunedinensis =

Species of sea cucumber

Taeniogyrus dunedinensis, commonly known as the burrowing sea cucumber, is a small species of sea cucumber from New Zealand. It is found in shallow water, and was first identified in the Dunedin harbour. It is around 40mm long, and is found throughout the coastal waters of New Zealand and the Campbell and Chatham Islands.

== Description ==
Taeniogyrus dunedinensis is named after Dunedin, the city in which it was first identified by Thomas Parker, and was first called Chirodota dunedinensis. It has one subspecies, Taeniogyrus dunedinensis microurna (Mortensen, 1925).

Parker originally described the creature as being about 4 centimetres (2 in) in length, with ten tapering whitish tentacles, a smooth integument, and a yellowish colour caused by the internal organs being visible through its translucent skin. He also described small red spots on the body which disappear when placed in spirit, and dark spots on the inner side of the tentacles, which are not affected by spirit. The maximum body width is 3mm.

Pawson (1963) synonymised T. benhami (as Chirodota benhami) on the basis that the hook length and tentacle rod morphology fell within the normal range for T. dunedinensis.

== Distribution ==
T. dunedinensis is found in the littoral zone, around the coast of New Zealand, including the Campbell, Auckland and Chatham Islands. It is reported to have a preference for sandy and muddy substrates, where it burrows.

A specimen in the collection of Te Papa National Museum was collected during a 1969 pollution survey of the Dunedin harbour.

== Life history ==
Pawson (1963) reports that an individual observed in captivity appeared to feed by ingesting particles which had adhered to sticky secretions on the tentacles. The tentacles were wiped rapidly across the mouth. The feeding appeared to be continuous. T. dunedinensis has separate sexes, with a viviparous female.
