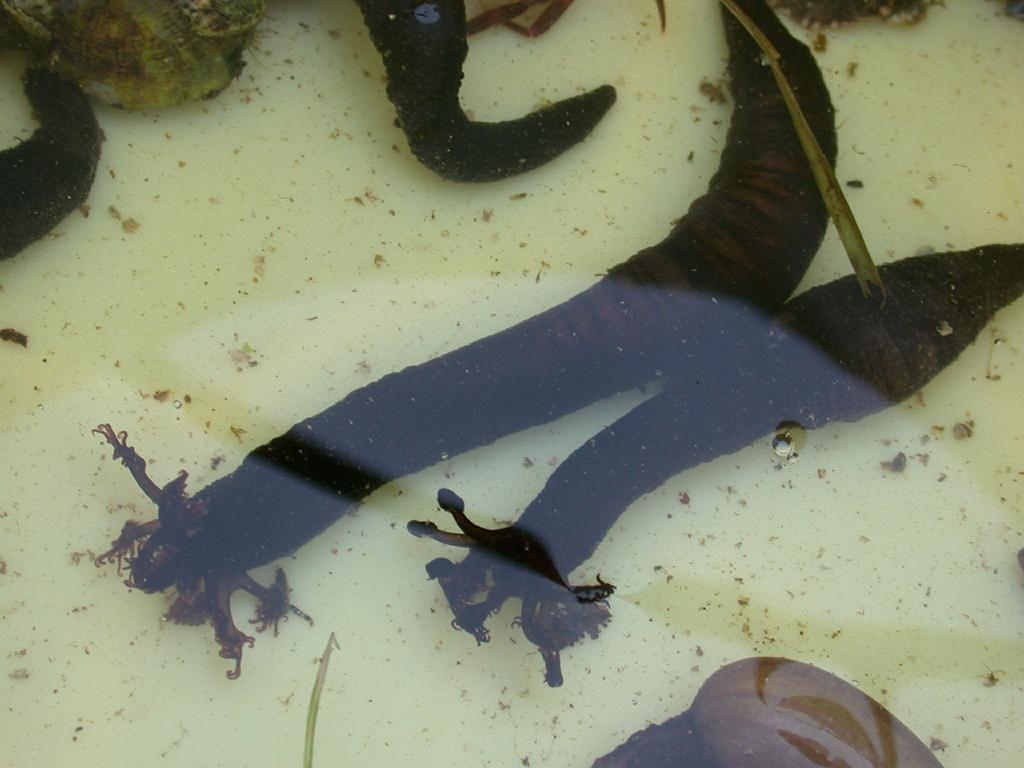
- Polycheira rufescens

Scientific classification
- Kingdom: Animalia
- Phylum: Echinodermata
- Class: Holothuroidea
- Order: Apodida
- Family: Chiridotidae
- Genus: Polycheira; Eschscholtz, 1829

Species
- See text.

= Polycheira =

Genus of sea cucumbers

Polycheira is a genus of holothurians (sea cucumbers) found in tropical Indo-Pacific.

A curious pattern of reproduction has been found in Polycheira rufescens where specimens change their sex from male to female and from female to male in a reproductive season

== Systematics ==
Polycheira appear to be closely related to the genus Chiridota (both belong to the subfamily Chiridotinae). The type species of the genus is Polycheira rufescens (Brandt, 1835).

The following species are recognised in the genus Polycheira:

- Polycheira echinata Heding, 1928
- Polycheira nusalaut Setyastuti & Lüter, 2026
- Polycheira rufescens (Brandt, 1835)
