= T. J. Parker =

T. J. Parker may refer to:

- Thomas Jeffery Parker (1850–1897), British-New Zealand zoologist
- T. J. Parker (basketball) (born 1984), French-American basketball player and coach
- T. J. Parker (American football) (born 2004), American football player
