= Thomas Jeffery Parker =

English zoologist

Thomas Jeffery Parker FRS
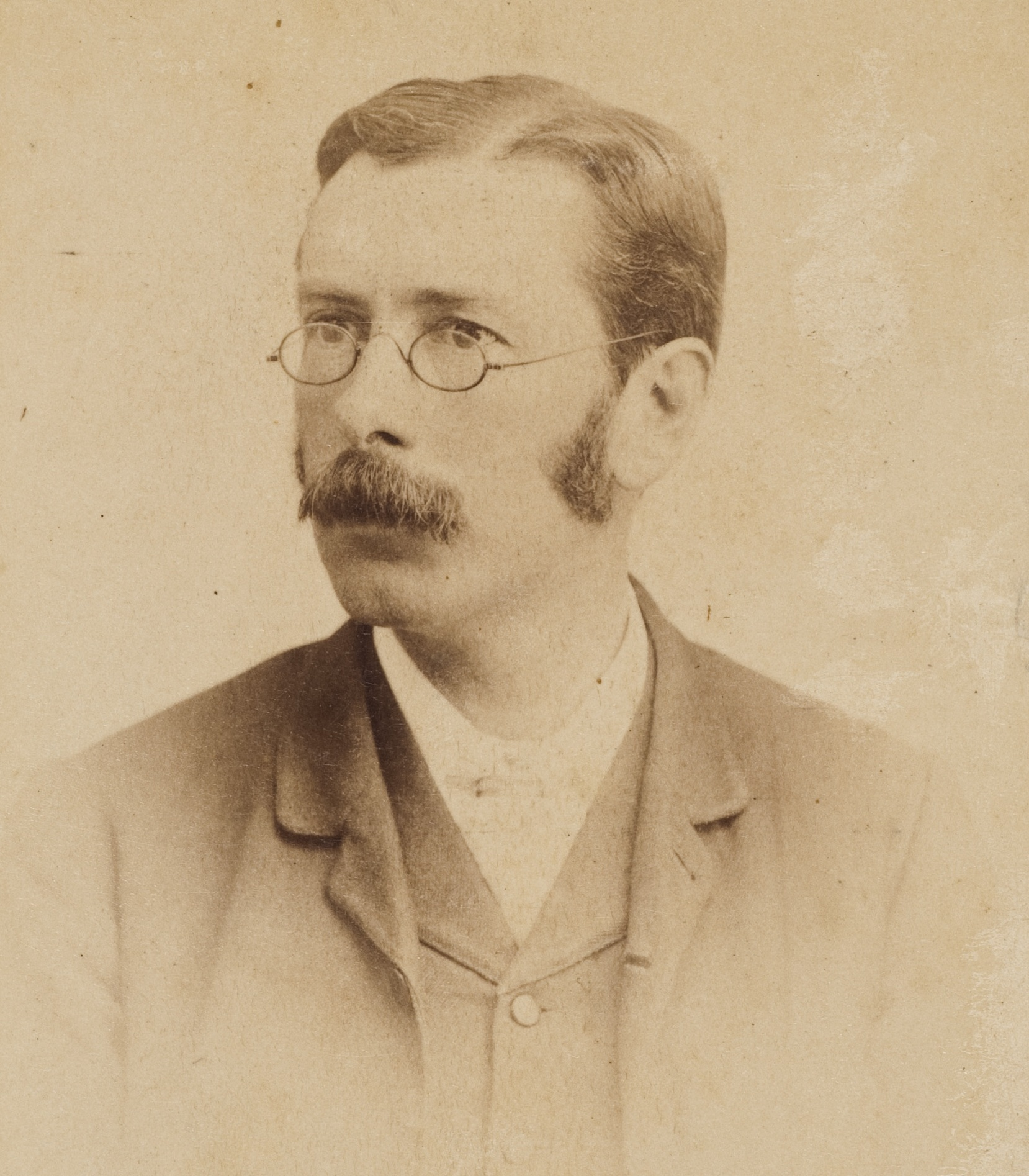
- Thomas Jeffery Parker, Port Chalmers, New Zealand, c. 1890, by David Alexander De Maus
- Born: 17 October 1850; London, England
- Died: 7 November 1897 (aged 47); Warrington, New Zealand
- Spouse: Charlotte Elizabeth Rossell (m. 1874)
- Scientific career
- Fields: Zoology
- Workplaces: University of Otago; Otago Museum

Thomas Jeffery Parker F.R.S. (17 October 1850 – 7 November 1897) was a zoologist who worked in New Zealand.

== Biography ==
Parker was born at 124 Tachbrook Street in London on 17 October 1850 the son of the anatomist William Kitchen Parker. He studied at Clarendon House School and graduated from the University of London in 1868.

At the age of 22, he worked with Thomas Henry Huxley in Huxley's zoological demonstrations, forming a teaching collection and organising laboratory practicals. Huxley's work on crayfish kindled in Parker an interest in crustaceans, and he went on to study the marine "crayfish" (spiny lobsters) of New Zealand, together with his student Josephine Gordon Rich, who later married William Aitcheson Haswell.

On 23 December 1874, Thomas Jeffery Parker married Charlotte Elizabeth Rossell in Bramley, Yorkshire. In 1880, they emigrated to New Zealand. Parker become Professor of Zoology at the University of Otago in Dunedin, succeeding Frederick Hutton. He was also curator of the Otago Museum, and was "the first trained biologist in the colony".

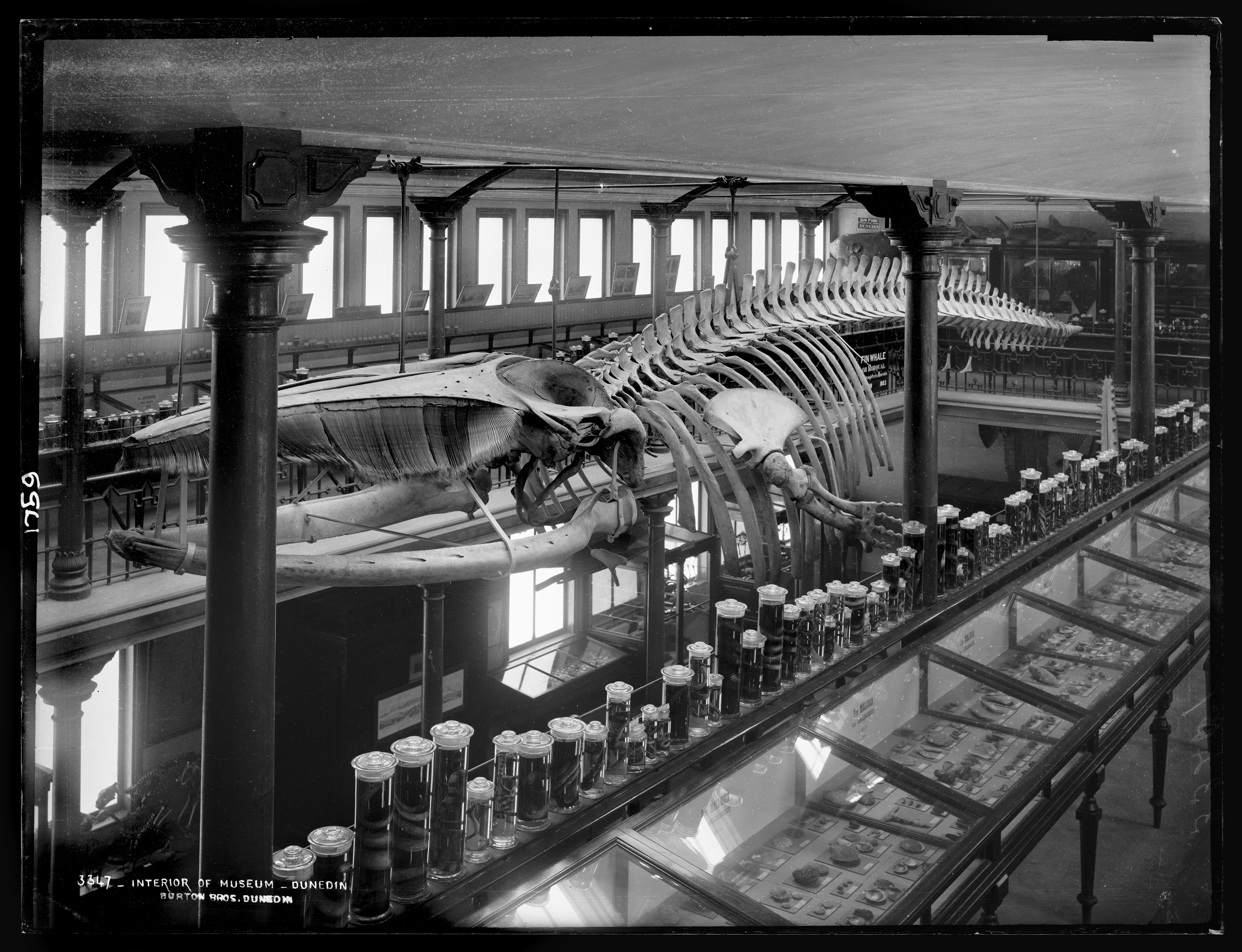
Fin whale skeleton, Otago Museum, as acquired and displayed by T.J. Parker

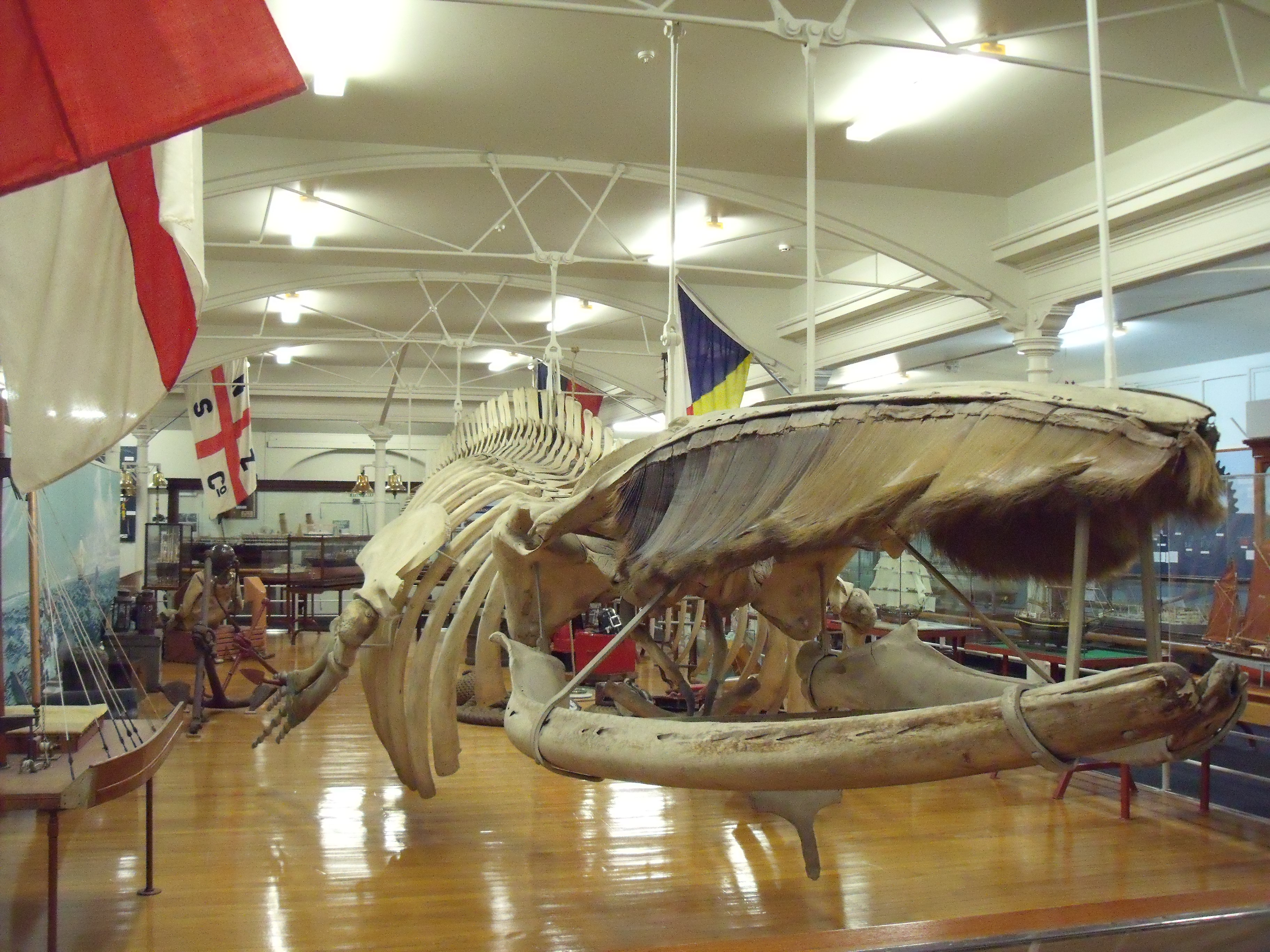
Fin whale displayed in Otago Museum 2010

Parker sent a display of a series of skulls to the Melbourne International Exhibition in 1880, which was later reused in the New Zealand and South Seas Exhibition in Dunedin. The display used coloured wires and painted bones to show the evolution of the vertebrate skull. Indeed, Parker was noted by a Tuapeka Times correspondent as having a "mania for skeletons...[and] has procured some splendid and interesting specimens of birds and fish." In 1883, Parker obtained a fin whale specimen from Captain William Jackson Barry, who had himself bought and exhibited it in Nelson. The fin whale skeleton is still a central feature of the current Maritime Gallery.

Parker was made a Fellow of the Royal Society on 7 June 1888.

In his later years, Parker suffered from diabetes, and he died on 7 November 1897 at Warrington. After his death, Parker was succeeded at the University of Otago by William Blaxland Benham.

== Works ==
Parker produced more than 40 scientific papers. They include nine papers on moas published between 1889 and 1895, and a 100-page monograph on the history of the kiwi, which was later condensed into two articles in the New Zealand Journal of Science. Parker identified a new species of sea cucumber (Chirodota dunedinensis, now Taeniogyrus dunedinensis) soon after arriving in Dunedin. Despite living in different countries, Parker wrote an introductory textbook on zoology together with William Aitcheson Haswell, which continued to be used into the 1960s.

=== Memoirs on New Zealand animals ===
- "On the Structure and Development of Apteryx"
- "On the Cranial Osteology, Classification, and Phylogeny of the Dinornithidæ"
- "Observations on the anatomy and development of Apteryx". Philosophical Transactions of the Royal Society B: 182: 25-134

=== Books ===
- Zoötomy (1884)
- Lessons in Elementary Biology (1890)
- Parker, T. Jeffery; Haswell, William A. (1897). A Textbook of Zoology. London: Macmillan and Co. OCLC 863109417 (all editions). ( in 2 volumes).

== Taxon named in his honor ==
- The Oarfish Agrostichthys parkeri (Benham, 1904) was named after him.
