= William Aitcheson Haswell =

Scottish-Australian zoologist

William Aitcheson Haswell FRS (5 August 1854 – 24 January 1925) was a Scottish-Australian zoologist specialising in crustaceans, winner of the 1915 Clarke Medal.

His zoological author abbreviation is Haswell.

== Early life ==
Haswell was born at Gayfield House, Edinburgh, son of James Haswell, banker, and his wife Margaret, née Cranston. Haswell studied at the Edinburgh Institution and the University of Edinburgh (M.A., 1877; BSc, 1878; D.Sc., 1887) where he won seven medals, and at the conclusion of his course gained the Bell-Baxter scholarship as the most distinguished natural science student of his year. Amongst his teachers were Thomas Henry Huxley, Archibald Geikie and Charles Wyville Thomson. He qualified for the MA and BSc degrees in 1878, and immediately afterwards, for reasons of health, went on a voyage to Australia.

== Career ==
Haswell arrived in Sydney in late 1878 and soon began work in a small marine zoological laboratory at Watsons Bay. There he researched the collections from the Chevert expedition to New Guinea, and the marine fauna of Port Jackson and the adjacent coast.

He accepted a post as curator at the Queensland Museum in Brisbane, but moved back to Sydney after one year in the position. In 1881 he collected specimens along the tropical coast of Queensland as a guest on HMS Alert.

He collaborated with Charles Hedley and Sir Joseph Verco in investigating the continental shelf.

In January 1898 appeared Haswell's best known publication A Text Book of Zoology (London) written in conjunction with Thomas Jeffery Parker of the University of Otago, New Zealand. A fourth edition was released in 1928 and it remained a standard in Australian zoology courses for decades. .

== Late life and legacy ==
Haswell Place, a residential street in the Canberra suburb of Chifley, is named after him.

== Family ==
In 1894 Haswell married Josephine Gordon Rich at St Luke's Church in Christchurch, New Zealand. Rich had been a student of Haswell's colleague TJ Parker. Although Rich herself did not publish again after her marriage, she continued her interest in science by assisting his research. The couple had one daughter, Mary.

== Publications ==
Among the publications of William Aitcheson Haswell are:

- Haswell, William A. (1882). Catalogue of the Australian Stalk- and Sessile-eyed Crustacea. Sydney: F.W. White. OCLC 12198583 (all editions).
- — with T. Jeffery Parker (1897). A Textbook of Zoology. London: Macmillan and Co. OCLC 863109417 (all editions). ( in 2 volumes).
- — with T. Jeffery Parker (1899). A Manual of Zoology. London: Macmillan and Co. OCLC 761362546 (all editions).

== See also ==
- Taxa named by William Aitcheson Haswell

== Sources ==
- Patricia Morison, 'Haswell, William Aitcheson (1854–1925)', Australian Dictionary of Biography, Volume 9, MUP, 1983, pp 226–227. Retrieved 22 January 2009
- Serle, Percival (1949). "Haswell, William Aitcheson". Dictionary of Australian Biography. Sydney: Angus & Robertson.
- Australian Malacostraca page with some information on W. A. Haswell.
- Biographical Etymology of Marine Organism Names – H.

Awards
Preceded by Arthur Smith Woodward	Clarke Medal; 1915	Succeeded by Edgeworth David
