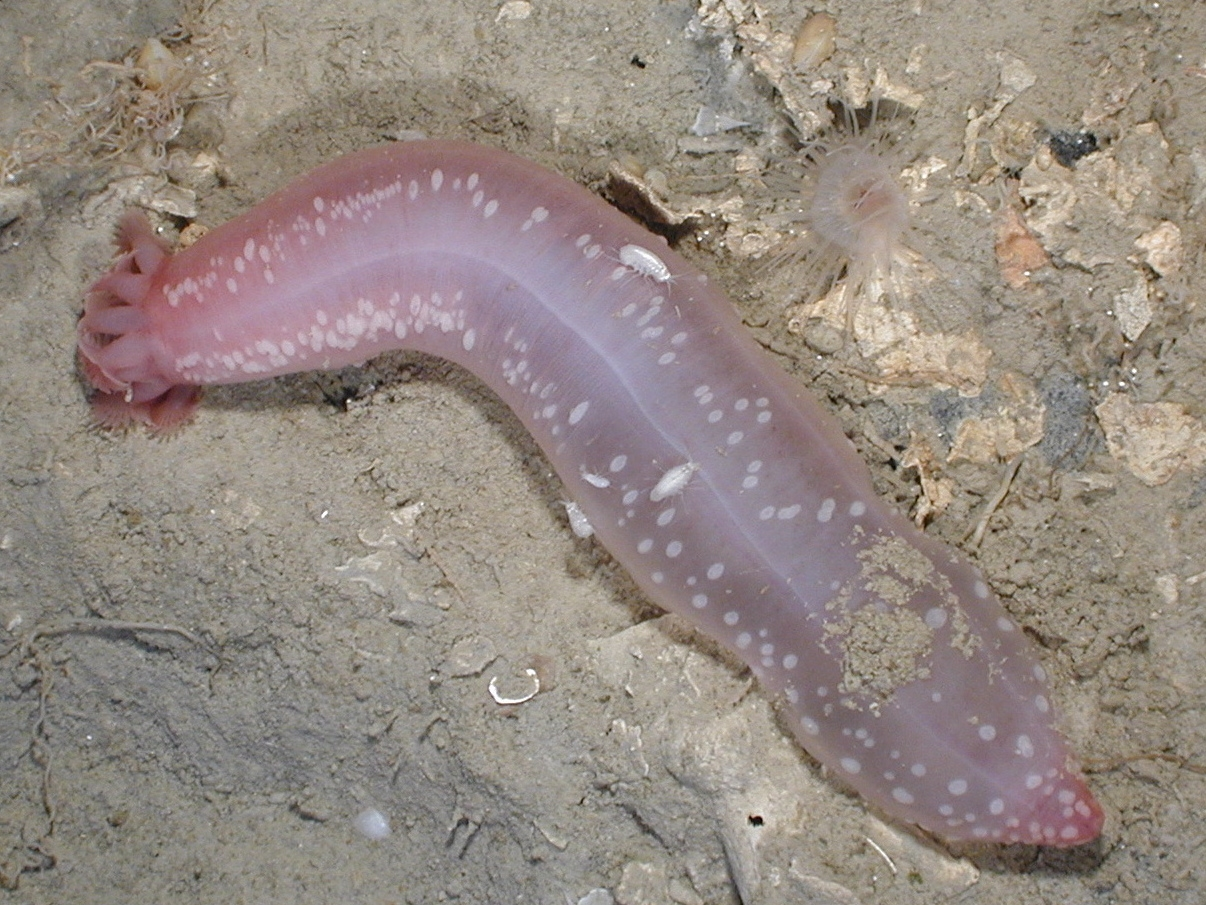

Scientific classification
- Kingdom: Animalia
- Phylum: Echinodermata
- Class: Holothuroidea
- Order: Apodida
- Family: Chiridotidae
- Genus: Chiridota
- Species: C. hydrothermica

Binomial name
- Chiridota hydrothermica Smirnov & Gebruk, 2000

Synonyms
- Chiridota heheva Pawson & Vance, 2004

= Chiridota hydrothermica =

Species of sea cucumber

Chiridota hydrothermica is a species of sea cucumber in the family Chiridotidae. It has a cosmopolitan distribution. It occupies all three types of chemosynthetic ecosystems; hydrothermal vents, cold seeps, and organic fall. Unlike many other animals in similar environments, they do not host chemosynthetic bacteria.
