= Ovalidota =

Scientific classification
- Kingdom: Animalia
- Phylum: Echinodermata
- Class: Holothuroidea
- Order: Apodida
- Family: Chiridotidae
- Genus: Ovalidota; Pawson, 2004
- Species: O. milleri

Binomial name
- Ovalidota milleri Pawson, 2004

Genus of sea cucumbers

Ovalidota is a genus of sea cucumber in the family Chiridotidae. It is represented by the single species Ovalidota milleri. It has been found at bathyal depths of 366-414 m at two localities in the Caribbean, near St. Vincent and at Grand Cayman Island. It is characterized by an egg-shaped body, a trait not found in any other member of the order Apodida, at the moment of its description.
