= Josephine Rich =

Zoologist

- Born: 1866; Spaxton
- Died: 6 September 1940; Darlinghurst
- Education: University of Otago
- Occupations: Zoologist, scientific illustrator

Josephine Gordon Rich later Haswell (1866–1940) was a New Zealand zoologist and one of only four New Zealand women who published results of her scientific work before 1901.

== Early life and education ==
Rich was born in 1866 in Spaxton, England, the youngest of five children of William Gordon Rich (1829–1912) and his wife. Her father was a runholder and Justice of the Peace in Southland, but Gordon Rich was born in England, where the family may have travelled for the education of Josephine's older brothers. Rich was a grand-daughter of early Otago politician John Richardson.

== Scientific work ==
In 1891, Rich achieved the highest grade in all her first year classes in zoology, botany, general biology, and practical biology from the University of Otago. Rich does not appear to have graduated despite her high grades, but this may be because she was not eligible to graduate, having been homeschooled. In 1889/1890, Dunedin hosted the New Zealand and South Seas Exhibition, for which Parker designed an exhibit on animal evolution. Rich contributed, among other drawings, five wall diagrams on extinct animals, which were described by a reporter as "instructive". The Otago Museum collection contains a set of 32 scientific water-colour and pen-and-ink drawings that Rich donated in 1893. Rich's drawings were informed by her dissections and preparation of specimens in the laboratory. She presented eleven stuffed fish to the Canterbury Museum in 1893, and supplied mollusc specimens to zoologist Henry Suter, who almost named a new species after her.

Rich was one of only four New Zealand women who published results of her scientific work before 1901. Her work on spiny lobsters (Palinurus edwardsii) was co-authored by her teacher Thomas Jeffery Parker in 1893. The paper described in detail the entire musculature of the animal; it was read before the Otago Institute in 1892 and published in the Maclay Memorial Volume of the New South Wales Linnean Society in 1893. Rich provided 25 of the 27 images in the paper, which were described as "remarkably clear" by a reviewer in the London review journal Natural Science.

== Later life ==
On 28 August 1894, Josephine married the Australian William Aitcheson Haswell (1854–1925), a friend of Thomas Jeffrey Parker, in Christchurch, New Zealand, and subsequently moved to Australia. Haswell was a professor of biology at the University of Sydney, and although Rich does not appear to have published after her marriage, she assisted her husband in his work. She contributed nine drawings to the Textbook of Zoology, co-authored by Parker and Haswell and published in 1897. Parker described Rich's drawing of a rabbit as "magnificent".

The Haswells had a son in 1897, who died at 5 months old, and a daughter, Mary Margaret, born 1899. Rich died in a private hospital in Darlinghurst on 6 September 1940. She was survived by her daughter.

In 2017, she was featured as one of the Royal Society Te Apārangi's 150 women in 150 words.

== Works ==
- Parker, T[homas] Jeffery, & Rich, Josephine Gordon. "Observations on the myology of Palinurus Edwardsii, Hutton". [1892.] N. S. Wales Linn. Soc. (Macleay Mem. Vol.), 1893, 159-178.
