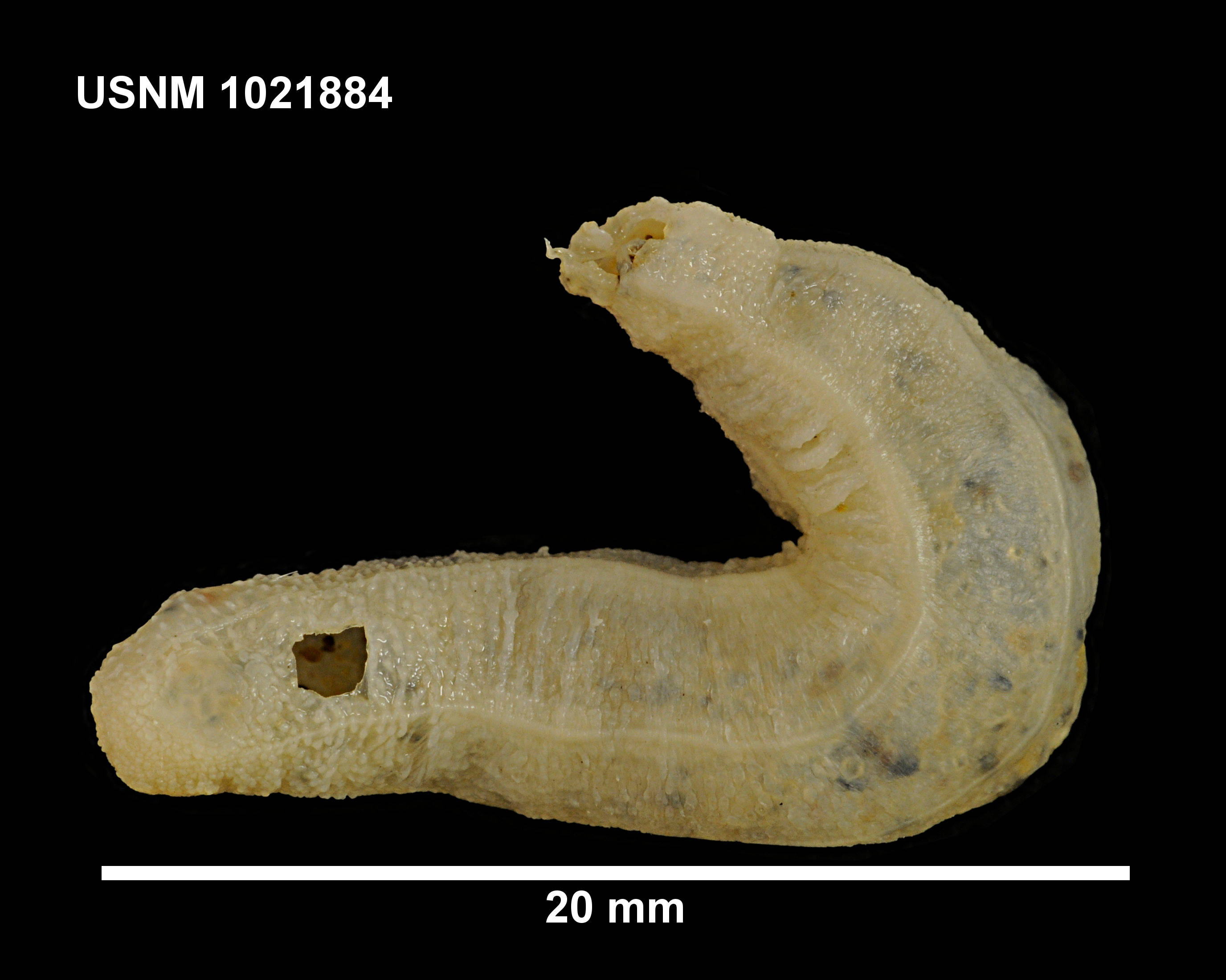
- Kolostoneura novaezealandiae

Scientific classification
- Kingdom: Animalia
- Phylum: Echinodermata
- Class: Holothuroidea
- Order: Apodida
- Family: Chiridotidae
- Genus: Kolostoneura; Becher, 1909

Type species
- Rhabdomolgus novae-zealandiae Dendy & Hindle, 1907

Species
- See Taxonomy

= Kolostoneura =

Genus of sea cucumbers

Kolostoneura is a genus of sea cucumber in the family Chiridotidae. K. novaezealandiae was first recorded in the shallow coastal waters of New Zealand, while K. griffithsi is known from the Scotia Sea in Antarctica from depths of 506 m.

== Taxonomy ==
The following species are recognised in the genus Kolostoneura:

- K. griffithsi O'Loughlin & VandenSpiegel, 2010
- K. novaezealandiae (Dendy & Hindle, 1907)
