= Theelia =

Theelia Temporal range: Middle Pennsylvanian to Lutetian

Scientific classification
- Kingdom: Animalia
- Phylum: Echinodermata
- Class: Holothuroidea
- Subclass: Paractinopoda
- Order: Apodida
- Family: Chiridotidae
- Genus: †Theelia; Schlumberger 1890

Type species
- †Chirodota undulata Schlumberger, 1888

Species
- See text

Synonyms
- †Chiridotites Deflandre-Rigaud, 1951

Extinct genus of sea cucumbers

Theelia is an extinct genus of sea cucumbers that existed from 312 to 40.4 million years ago (Middle Pennsylvanian to the Lutetian age).

Fossil sclerites of Theelia are found worldwide.

== Taxonomy ==
Numerous species are assigned to the genus Theelia, they include the following:

- †Theelia alta Speckmann 1968
- †Theelia alveata Mostler and Rahimi-Yazd 1976
- †Theelia anguinea Mostler 1971
- †Theelia conglobata Mostler 1971
- †Theelia convexa Whidborne 1883
- †Theelia crassidentata Deflandre-Rigaud 1950
- †Theelia dentata Górka and Luszczewska 1969
- †Theelia doreckae Kozur and Mostler 1971
- †Theelia dzhulfaensis Mostler and Rahimi-Yazd 1976
- †Theelia fastigata Mostler 1972
- †Theelia fissa Mostler 1971
- †Theelia florida Frizzell and Exline 1955
- †Theelia guembeli Kristan-Tollmann 1963
- †Theelia heptalampra (Bartenstein, 1936)
- †Theelia hexacneme Summerson and Campbell 1958
- †Theelia immisorbicula Mostler 1968
- †Theelia koeveskalensis Kozur and Mostler 1971
- †Theelia kutscheri Reich, 2003
- †Theelia lanceolata (Schlumberger, 1890)
- †Theelia lata Kozur and Mostler 1971
- †Theelia latimarginata Mostler 1971
- †Theelia liptovskaensis Gazdzicki et al. 1978
- †Theelia mesopermiana Kozur and Mostler 1989
- †Theelia monicae Mostler and Rahimi-Yazd 1976
- †Theelia mortenseni (Deflandre-Rigaud, 1951)
- †Theelia multiplex Speckmann 1968
- †Theelia norica Mostler 1969
- †Theelia petasiformis Kristan-Tolmann 1964
- †Theelia planata Mostler 1968
- †Theelia polydenticulata Mostler and Parwin 1973
- †Theelia praeacuta Mostler and Rahimi-Yazd 1976
- †Theelia praenorica Kozur and Mock 1972
- †Theelia praeseniradiata Kozur and Mock 1972
- †Theelia pseudoplanata Kozur and Mock 1972
- †Theelia seniradiata Zankl 1966
- †Theelia serta Speckmann 1968
- †Theelia sinaiensis Said and Barakat 1958
- †Theelia speciosa (Deflandre-Rigaud, 1946)
- †Theelia staurolithensis Kristan-Tolmann 1972
- †Theelia stellifera Zankl 1966
- †Theelia synapta Gilliland 1992
- †Theelia teneromarginata Mostler 1971
- †Theelia terquemi (Deflandre-Rigaud, 1951)
- †Theelia trammeri Gazdzicki et al. 1978
- †Theelia undata Mostler 1968
- †Theelia undulata (Schlumberger, 1890)
- †Theelia variabilis Zankl 1966
- †Theelia wartensis Garbowska and Wierzbowski 1967
- †Theelia zawidzkae Kozur and Mock 1972
