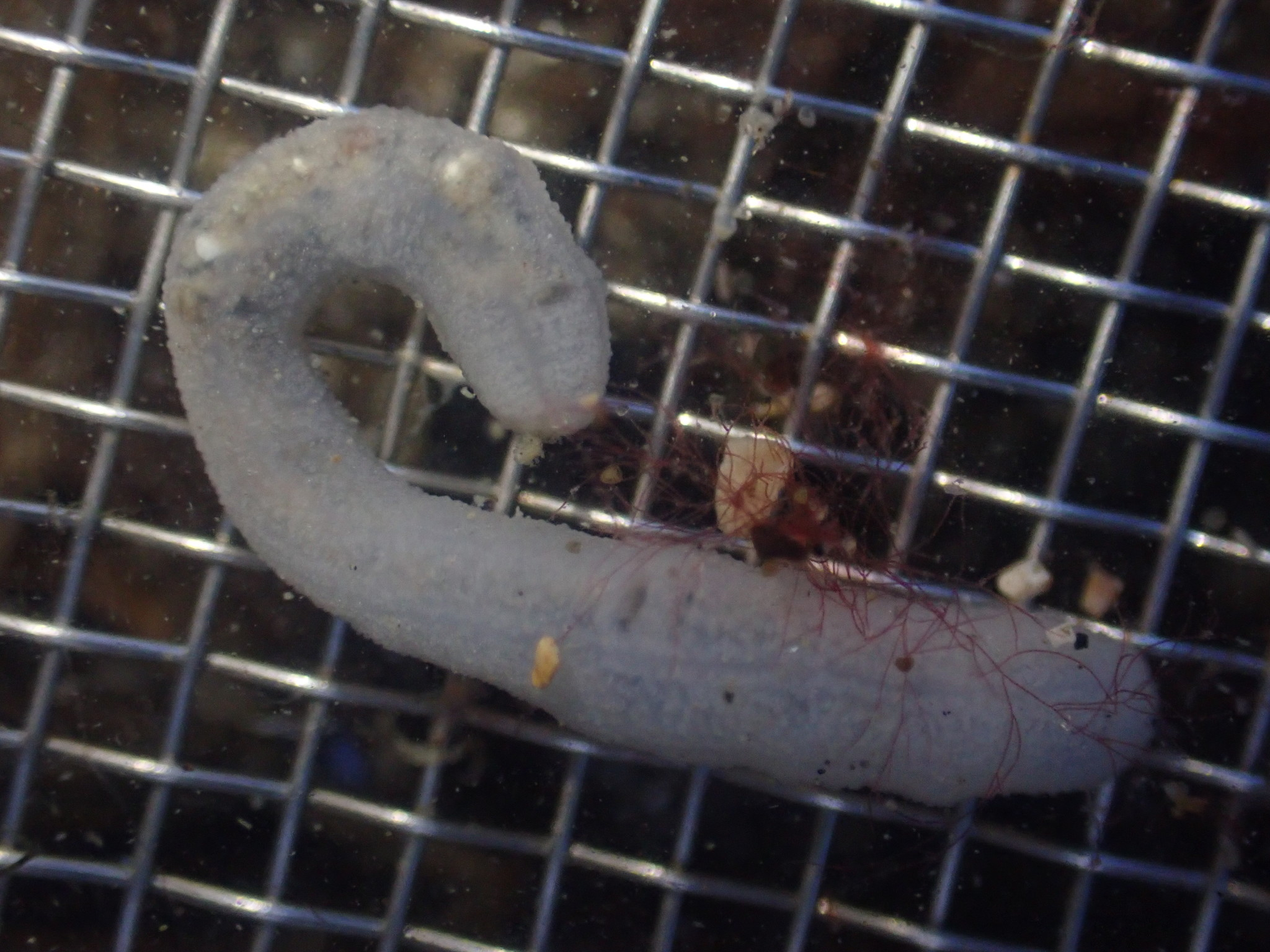
- Taeniogyrus dendyi
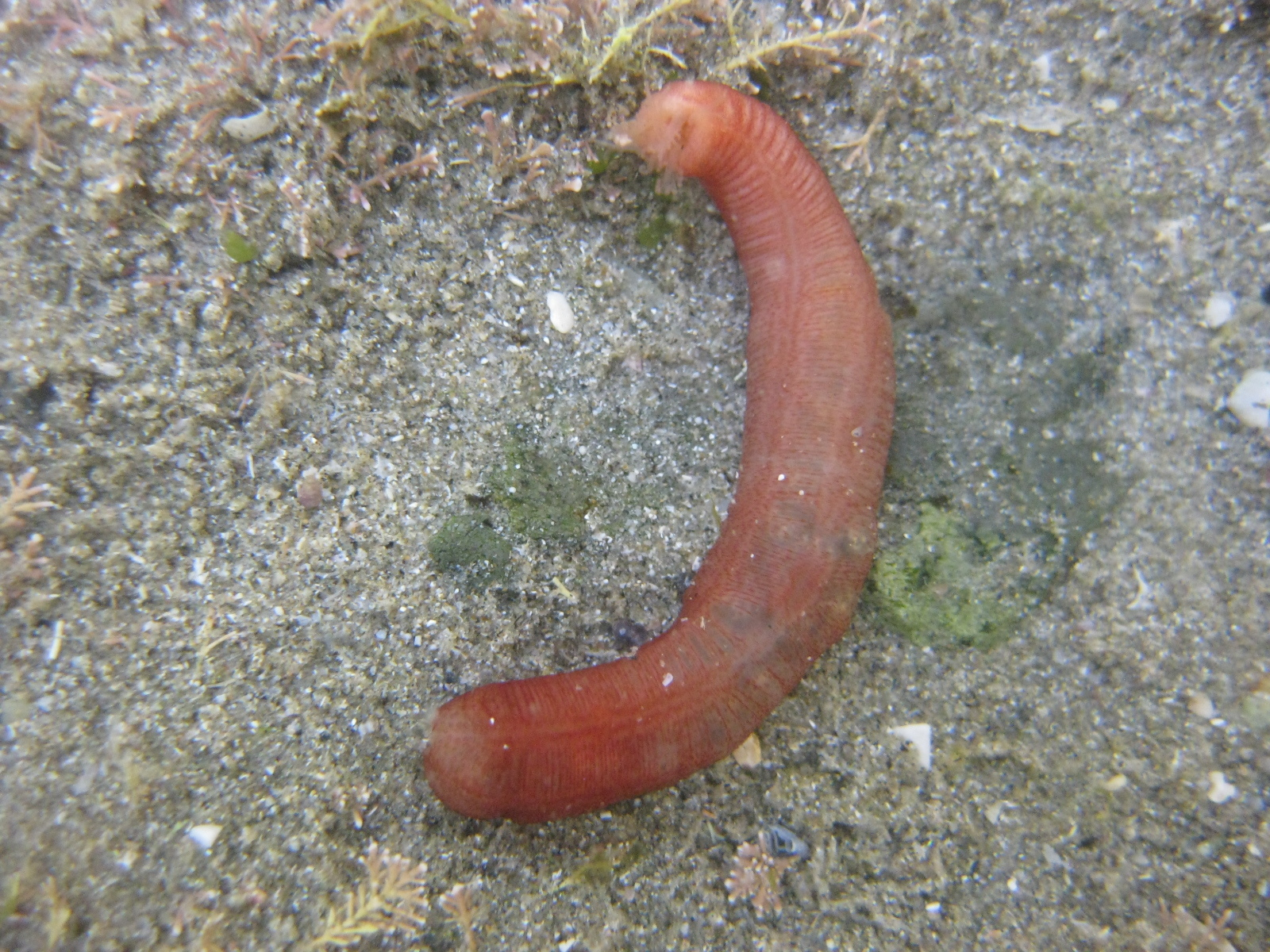
- Taeniogyrus dunedinensis

Scientific classification
- Kingdom: Animalia
- Phylum: Echinodermata
- Class: Holothuroidea
- Order: Apodida
- Family: Chiridotidae
- Genus: Taeniogyrus; Semper, 1867

Type species
- Chiridota australiana Stimpson, 1855

Species
- See Taxonomy

= Taeniogyrus =

Genus of sea cucumbers

Taeniogyrus is a genus of sea cucumber in the family Chiridotidae. Most species in the genus are primarily known from shallow water of the Indo-Pacific region, particularly from Australia, New Zealand, and Japan. Some species, however, have also been recorded in other areas, such as Antarctica, the Mediterranean Sea, or the South Atlantic Ocean.

== Taxonomy ==
The following species are recognised in the genus Taeniogyrus:

- T. albulus Yamana, Hirabayashi, Tanaka & Ogawa in Yamana et al., 2022
- T. antarcticus Heding, 1931
- T. australianus (Stimpson, 1855)
- T. bamberi O'Loughlin in O'Loughlin et al., 2015
- T. cidaridis Ohshima, 1915
- T. clavus Heding, 1928
- T. dayi Cherbonnier, 1952
- T. dendyi (Mortensen, 1925)
- T. diasemus (Clark, 1921)
- T. dunedinensis (Parker, 1881)
- T. flavus Yamana & Tanaka in Yamana et al., 2022
- T. furcipraeditus (Salvini-Plawen, 1972)
- T. havelockensis (Rao, 1975)
- T. heterosigmus Heding, 1931
- T. inexspectatus (Smirnov, 1989)
- T. japonicus (von Marenzeller, 1882)
- T. keiensis Heding, 1928
- T. maculatus (Clark, 1921)
- T. m. Yamana, Tanaka & Nakachi, 2017
- T. neocaledonicus (Smirnov, 1997)
- T. papillis O'Loughlin in O'Loughlin & VandenSpiegel, 2007
- T. prydzi O'Loughlin & VandenSpiegel, 2010
- T. purpureus (Lesson, 1830)
- T. roebucki (Joshua, 1914)
- T. roseus (Ohshima, 1914)
- T. rubrus Yamana, Hirabayashi, Hirai, Dan & Ogawa in Yamana et al., 2022
- T. tantulus O'Loughlin in O'Loughlin & VandenSpiegel, 2007
- T. venustus (Semon, 1887)
- T. verruculosus Yamana & Tanaka, 2017
- T. yvonnae Moura, Campos & Esteves, 2015
