= William Jackson Barry =

New Zealand adventurer and writer

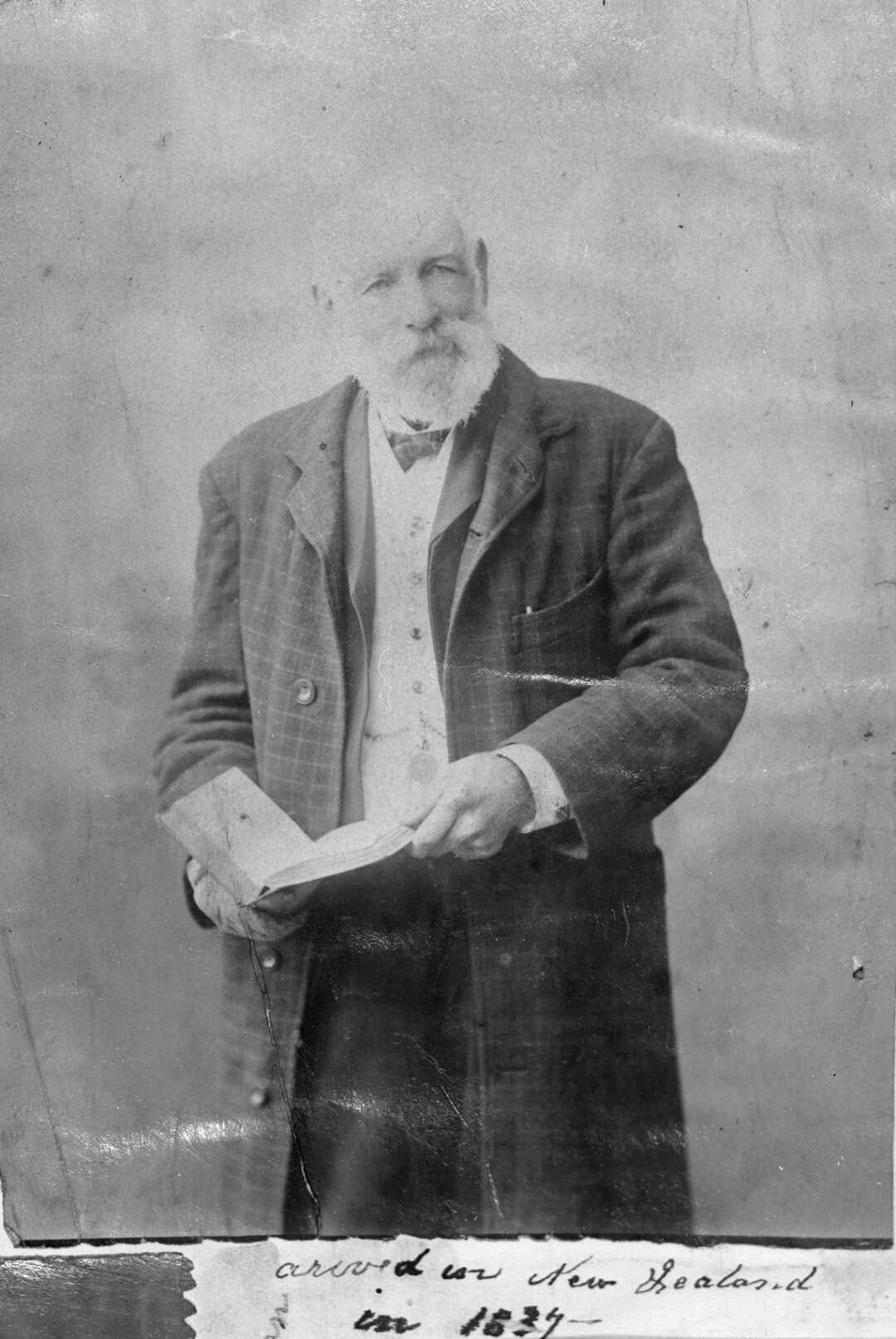
- Photograph of Captain William Jackson Barry taken in 1870s by unknown photographer.
- Born: 1819
- Died: 23 April 1907 (aged 87–88)

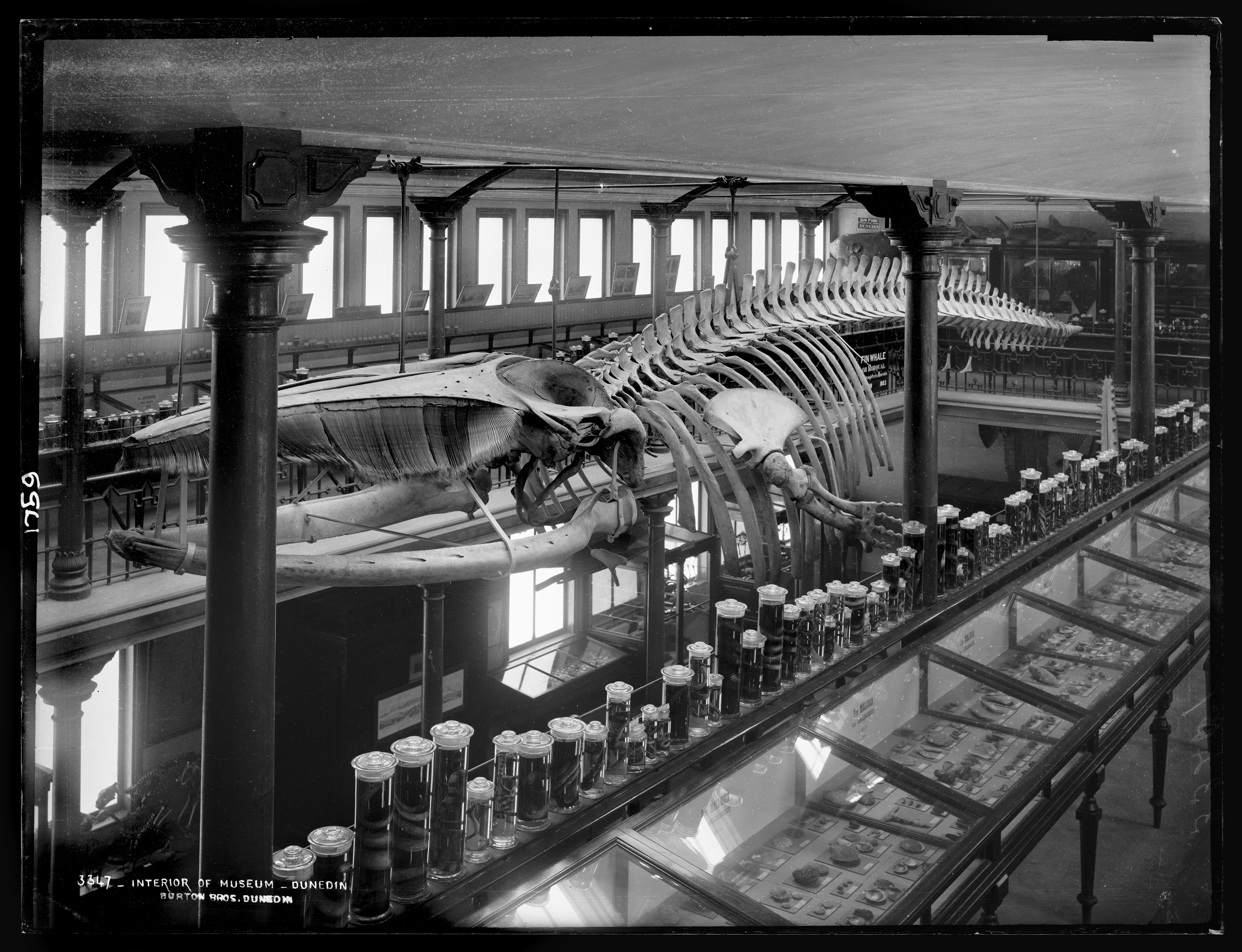
Fin whale collected by Captain William Jackson Barry, displayed in Otago Museum

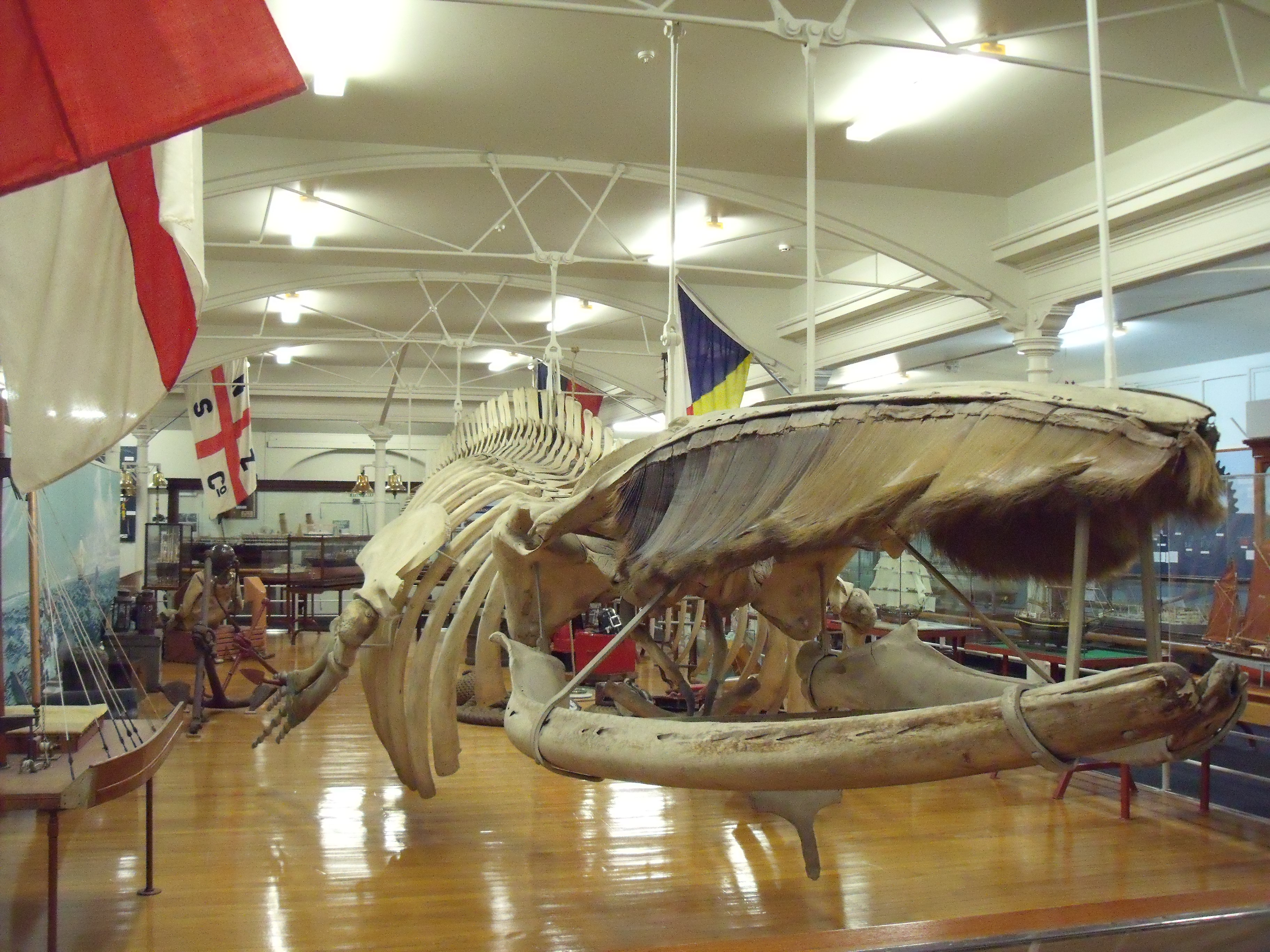
Fin whale Otago Museum 2010

William Jackson Barry (1819 – 23 April 1907) was a New Zealand adventurer and writer. He was born in Melbourn, Cambridgeshire, England on 1819, and between 1866 and 1868 was Mayor of Cromwell.

In 1883, Barry bought a whale skeleton that had beached itself on the sands in Nelson. Barry prepared and exhibited the skeleton at a Nelson store, and then on tour, before arriving in Dunedin. The Otago Daily Times reported that Barry opened the whale up to public inspection in a warehouse in St Andrews Street, even going so far as to hold a dinner party in its jaws. By August 1883, Barry had sold the fin whale to Otago Museum, where it is still on display.

Barry wrote a fantastical autobiography in 1878, Up and Down: Or, Fifty Years' Colonial Experiences in Australia, California, New Zealand, India, China, and the South Pacific; Being the Life History of Capt. W. J. Barry. WRITTEN BY HIMSELF, 1878, with portrait of author, and other illustrations."
