= Charles Lincoln Edwards =

American zoologist

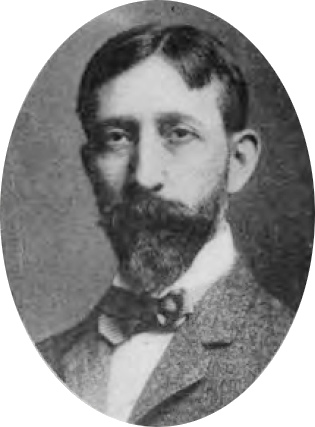
- Edwards in 1910
- Born: December 8, 1863; Oquawka, Illinois
- Died: May 6, 1937 (aged 73)
- Education: Lombard College; University of Minnesota; Indiana University; Leipzig University
- Scientific career
- Fields: Zoology
- Workplaces: University of Texas (1892–94); University of Cincinnati (1894–1900); Trinity College (1900–10); University of Southern California (1911–13)

Signature
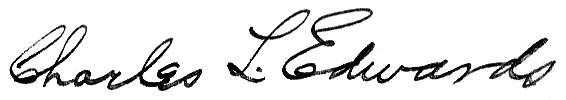

Charles Lincoln Edwards (December 8, 1863 – May 6, 1937) was an American zoologist. His research included studies of development in reptiles and sea cucumbers, chromosomes of Ascaris roundworms, and taxonomy of sea cucumbers and copepods, naming at least five species of copepods found in sea cucumber body cavities.

Edwards was a fellow of the American Association for the Advancement of Science and a member of the American Society of Zoologists, the American Society of Naturalists, and Southern California Academy of Sciences, as well as the Mexican Society for Geography and Statistics, Mexican Society of Natural History, and Antonio Alzate Scientific Society. He had a secondary interest in folklore, being the author of Bahama Songs and Stories, and was in 1889 the president of the American Folklore Society.

Edwards was a member of Delta Tau Delta and was inducted into the Distinguish Service Chapter in recognition of his lifetime involvement.

Edwards was born in Oquawka, Illinois, on December 8, 1863, to John and Nancy (Stockton) Edwards. His father, of Welsh descent, was a banker and member of the Indiana legislature.

Edwards attended Lombard College and joined the Lambda (prime) chapter of Delta Tau Delta. In 1882, he transferred to the University of Minnesota where he founded the Beta Eta Chapter of Delta Tau Delta in 1883. He also served as Western Division President of Delta Tau Delta from 1883 to 1884. He returned to Lombard College in 1884 and received his B.S. degree. He subsequently pursued another B.S degree at the Indiana University. While he was at Indiana, he refounded the Beta Alpha chapter of Delta Tau Delta. In 1886, he determined to devote himself to the study of biology. He studied three years at Johns Hopkins University and then went to the University of Leipzig, where he received Ph.D. in 1890. He worked for two years as graduate fellow in Clark University, Massachusetts, and became assistant professor of biology at the University of Texas at Austin, where after two years he was dismissed for libeling a member of the board of regents.

He was made full professor at the University of Cincinnati in 1894 and remained there six years. From 1900 to 1910 he was the J. Pierpont Morgan Professor of Natural History in Trinity College, Connecticut. He then moved to University of Southern California where he was associate professor of biology (1911–1912), and Professor of Embryology and Histology (1912–1913). Beginning in 1912 he was director of nature studies in Los Angeles city schools.

Edwards was married to Jessie Withers Safford on June 5, 1889. He died May 6, 1937, at the age of 73. A species of eel, Moringua edwardsi, was named for him in 1889 by David Starr Jordan and C. H. Bollman.
