= Transcendental anatomy =

Form of comparative anatomy

Transcendental anatomy, also known as philosophical anatomy, was a form of comparative anatomy that sought to find ideal patterns and structures common to all organisms in nature. The term originated from naturalist philosophy in the German provinces, and culminated in Britain especially by scholars Robert Knox and Richard Owen, who drew from Goethe and Lorenz Oken. From the 1820s to 1859, it persisted as the medical expression of natural philosophy before the Darwinian revolution.

Amongst its various definitions, transcendental anatomy has four main tenets:

- the presupposition of an Ideal Plan among the multiplicity of visible structures in the animal and plant kingdom, and that the Plan determines function
- the Ideal Plan acted as a force for the maintenance of anatomical uniformity (as opposed to diversity-inducing forces of Nature)
- the belief that this a priori Plan was discoverable
- the desire to discover universal Laws underlying anatomical differences.

== History ==
Johann Wolfgang Goethe was one of many naturalists and anatomists in the nineteenth century who was in search of an Ideal Plan in nature. In Germany, this was known as Urpflanze for the plant kingdom and Urtier for animals. He popularized the term "morphology" for this search. Transcendental anatomy first derived from the naturalist philosophy known as Naturphilosophie.

In the 1820s, French anatomist Etienne Reynaud Augustin Serres (1786–1868) popularized the term transcendental anatomy to refer to the collective morphology of animal development. Synonymous expressions such as philosophical anatomy, higher anatomy, and transcendental morphology also arose at this time.

Some advocates regarded transcendental anatomy as the ultimate explanation for biological structures, while others saw it as one of several necessary explanatory devices.

== Vertebral theory ==
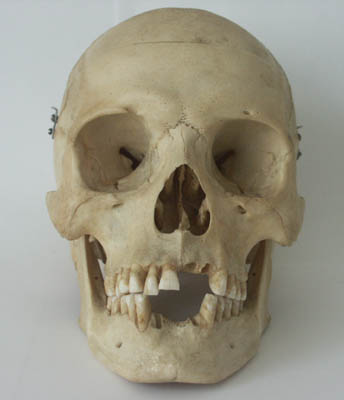
The osteology of the human skull was an important theory for transcendental anatomists.

Transcendental anatomists theorized that the bones of the skull were "cranial vertebra", or modified bones from the vertebrae. Owen ardently supported the theory as major evidence for his theory of homology.

The theory has since been discredited.
