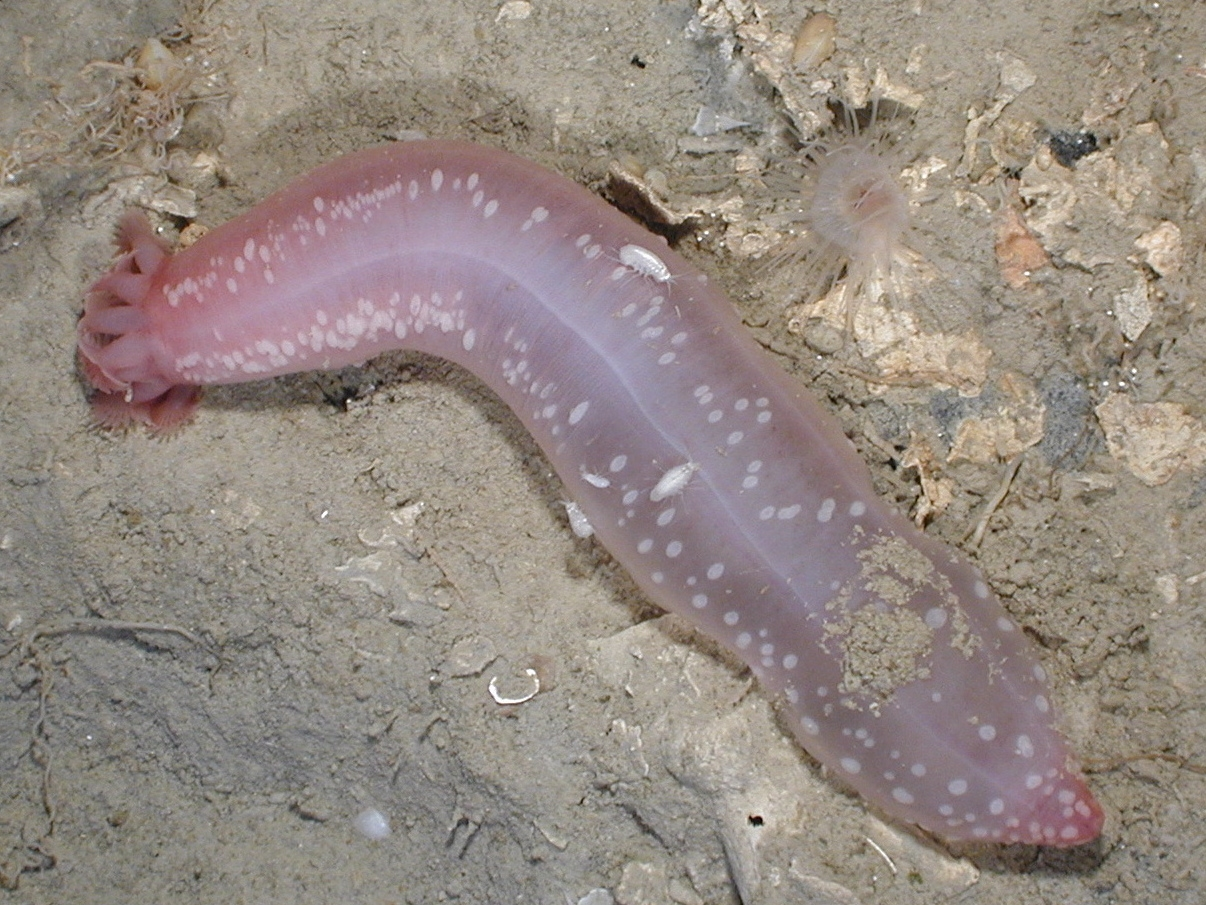
- Chiridota hydrothermica

Scientific classification
- Kingdom: Animalia
- Phylum: Echinodermata
- Class: Holothuroidea
- Order: Apodida
- Family: Chiridotidae
- Genus: Chiridota; Eschscholtz, 1829

Species
- See text

Synonyms
- Cheirodota [alt. spelling]; Chirodota Jaeger, 1833; Dactylota Brandt, 1835; Lioderma Bronn, 1860; Liosoma Brandt, 1835; Toxodora Verrill, 1882; Trochinus Ayres, 1852

= Chiridota =

Chiridota Temporal range: 326.4–0 Ma

Genus of sea cucumbers

Chiridota is a genus of sea cucumbers in the family Chiridotidae. It is an extant genus but some fossil species are known.

== Taxonomy ==
The following species are recognised in the genus Chiridota:

- Chiridota albatrossii Edwards, 1907
- Chiridota aponocrita Clark, 1920
- †Chiridota atava Waagen 1867
- Chiridota carnleyensis Mortensen, 1925
- Chiridota conceptacula Cherbonnier, 1963
- Chiridota discolor Eschscholtz, 1829
- Chiridota durbanensis Thandar, 1997
- †Chirodota elegans Malagoli 1888 (Pliocene)
- Chiridota exuga Cherbonnier, 1986
- Chiridota fernandensis Ludwig, 1898
- Chiridota ferruginea (Verrill, 1882)
- Chiridota gigas Dendy & Hindle, 1907
- Chiridota hawaiiensis Fisher, 1907
- †Chiridota heptalampra Bartenstein, 1936
- Chiridota hydrothermica Smirnov & Gebruk, 2000
- Chiridota impatiens Yamana & Tanaka, 2017
- Chiridota intermedia Bedford, 1899
- Chiridota kermadeca O'Loughlin & VandenSpiegel, 2012
- Chiridota laevis (O. Fabricius, 1780)
- Chiridota marenzelleri Perrier R., 1904
- Chiridota nanaimensis Heding, 1928
- Chiridota nigra Mortensen, 1925
- Chiridota ochotensis Savel'eva, 1941
- Chiridota orientalis Smirnov, 1981
- Chiridota pacifica Heding, 1928
- Chiridota peloria Deichmann, 1930
- Chiridota pisanii Ludwig, 1887
- Chiridota regalis Clark, 1908
- Chiridota rigida Semper, 1867
- Chiridota rotifera (Pourtalès, 1851)
- Chiridota smirnovi Massin, 1996
- Chiridota stuhlmanni Lampert, 1896
- Chiridota tauiensis Savel'eva, 1941
- †Cheirodota traquairii Etheridge 1881
- Chiridota uniserialis Fisher, 1907
- Chiridota violacea (J. Müller, 1849)
