= Comparative anatomy =

Study of similarities and differences in the anatomy of different species

Comparative anatomy studies similarities and differences in organisms. The image shows homologous bones in the upper limb of various vertebrates.

Comparative anatomy is a study of similarities and differences in the anatomy of different species. It is closely related to evolutionary biology and phylogeny (the evolution of species).

The science began in the classical era, continuing in the early modern period with work by Pierre Belon who noted the similarities of the skeletons of birds and humans.

Comparative anatomy has provided evidence of common descent, and has assisted in the classification of animals.

== History ==
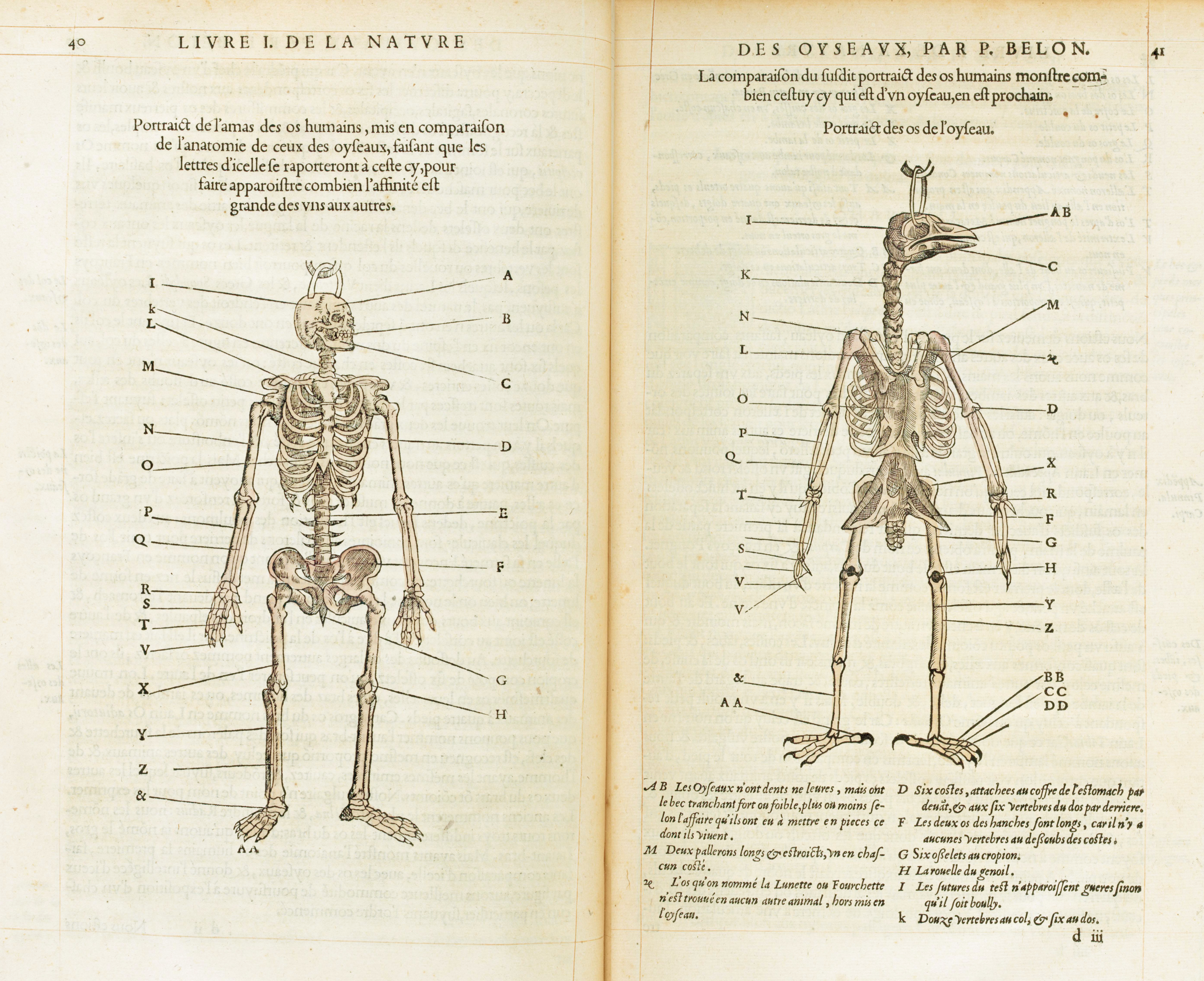
Skeletons of humans and birds compared by Pierre Belon, 1555

The first specifically anatomical investigation separate from a surgical or medical procedure is associated by Alcmaeon of Croton. Leonardo da Vinci made notes for a planned anatomical treatise in which he intended to compare the hands of various animals including bears. Pierre Belon, a French naturalist born in 1517, conducted research and held discussions on dolphin embryos as well as the comparisons between the skeletons of birds to the skeletons of humans. His research led to modern comparative anatomy.

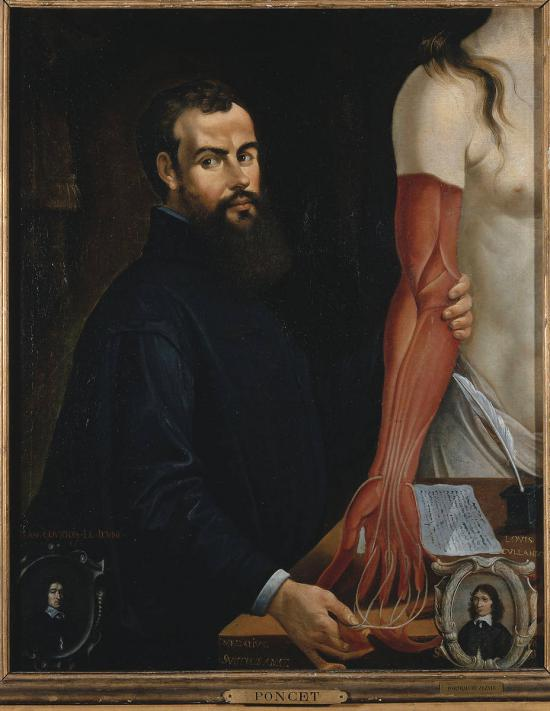
Andreas Vesalius

Around the same time, Andreas Vesalius was also making some strides of his own. A young anatomist of Flemish descent made famous by a penchant for amazing charts, he was systematically investigating and correcting the anatomical knowledge of the Greek physician Galen. He noticed that many of Galen's observations were not even based on actual humans. Instead, they were based on other animals such as non-human apes, monkeys, and oxen. In fact, he entreated his students to do the following, in substitution for human skeletons, as cited by Edward Tyson : "If you can't happen to see any of these, dissect an Ape, carefully view each Bone, &c. ..." Then he advises what sort of Apes to make the choice of, as most resembling a Man : And conclude "One ought to know the Structure of all the Bones either in a Humane Body or in an Apes; 'tis best in both; and then to go to the Anatomy of the Muscles." Up until that point, Galen and his teachings had been the authority on human anatomy. The irony is that Galen himself had emphasized the fact that one should make one's own observations instead of using those of another, but this advice was lost during the numerous translations of his work. As Vesalius began to uncover these mistakes, other physicians of the time began to trust their own observations more than those of Galen. An interesting observation made by some of these physicians was the presence of homologous structures in a wide variety of animals, even including humans. These observations were later used by Darwin as he formed his theory of Natural Selection.

Edward Tyson is regarded as the founder of modern comparative anatomy. He is credited with determining that whales and dolphins are, in fact, mammals. Also, he concluded that chimpanzees are more similar to humans than to monkeys because of their arms. Marco Aurelio Severino also compared various animals, including birds, in his Zootomia democritaea, one of the first works of comparative anatomy. In the 18th and 19th century, great anatomists like George Cuvier, Richard Owen and Thomas Henry Huxley revolutionized our understanding of the basic build and systematics of vertebrates, laying the foundation for Charles Darwin's work on evolution. An example of a 20th-century comparative anatomist is Victor Negus, who worked on the structure and evolution of the larynx. Until the advent of genetic techniques like DNA sequencing, comparative anatomy together with embryology were the primary tools for understanding phylogeny, as exemplified by the work of Alfred Romer.

== Concepts ==
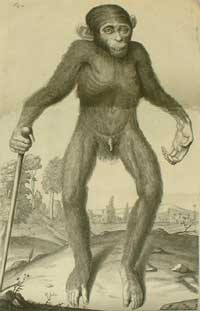
A drawing by Edward Tyson

Two major concepts of comparative anatomy are:

1. Homologous structures - structures (body parts/anatomy) which are similar in different species because the species have common descent and have evolved, usually divergently, from a shared ancestor. They may or may not perform the same function. An example is the forelimb structure shared by cats and whales.
2. Analogous structures - structures similar in different organisms because, in convergent evolution, they evolved in a similar environment, rather than were inherited from a recent common ancestor. They usually serve the same or similar purposes. An example is the streamlined torpedo body shape of porpoises and sharks. So even though they evolved from different ancestors, porpoises and sharks developed analogous structures as a result of their evolution in the same aquatic environment. This is known as a homoplasy.

== Uses ==
Comparative anatomy has long served as evidence for evolution, now joined in that role by comparative genomics; it indicates that organisms share a common ancestor.

It also assists scientists in classifying organisms based on similar characteristics of their anatomical structures. A common example of comparative anatomy is the similar bone structures in forelimbs of cats, whales, bats, and humans. All of these appendages consist of the same basic parts; yet, they serve completely different functions. The skeletal parts which form a structure used for swimming, such as a fin, would not be ideal for forming a wing, which is better suited for flight. One explanation for the forelimbs' similar composition is descent with modification. Through random mutations and natural selection, each organism's anatomical structures gradually adapted to suit their respective habitats. The rules for development of special characteristics which differ significantly from general homology were listed by Karl Ernst von Baer as the laws now named after him.

== See also ==
- Cladistics
- Comparative physiology
- Evolutionary developmental biology
- Phylogenetics
- Transcendental anatomy
- Outline of human anatomy
- Plant anatomy
- Anatomical model
