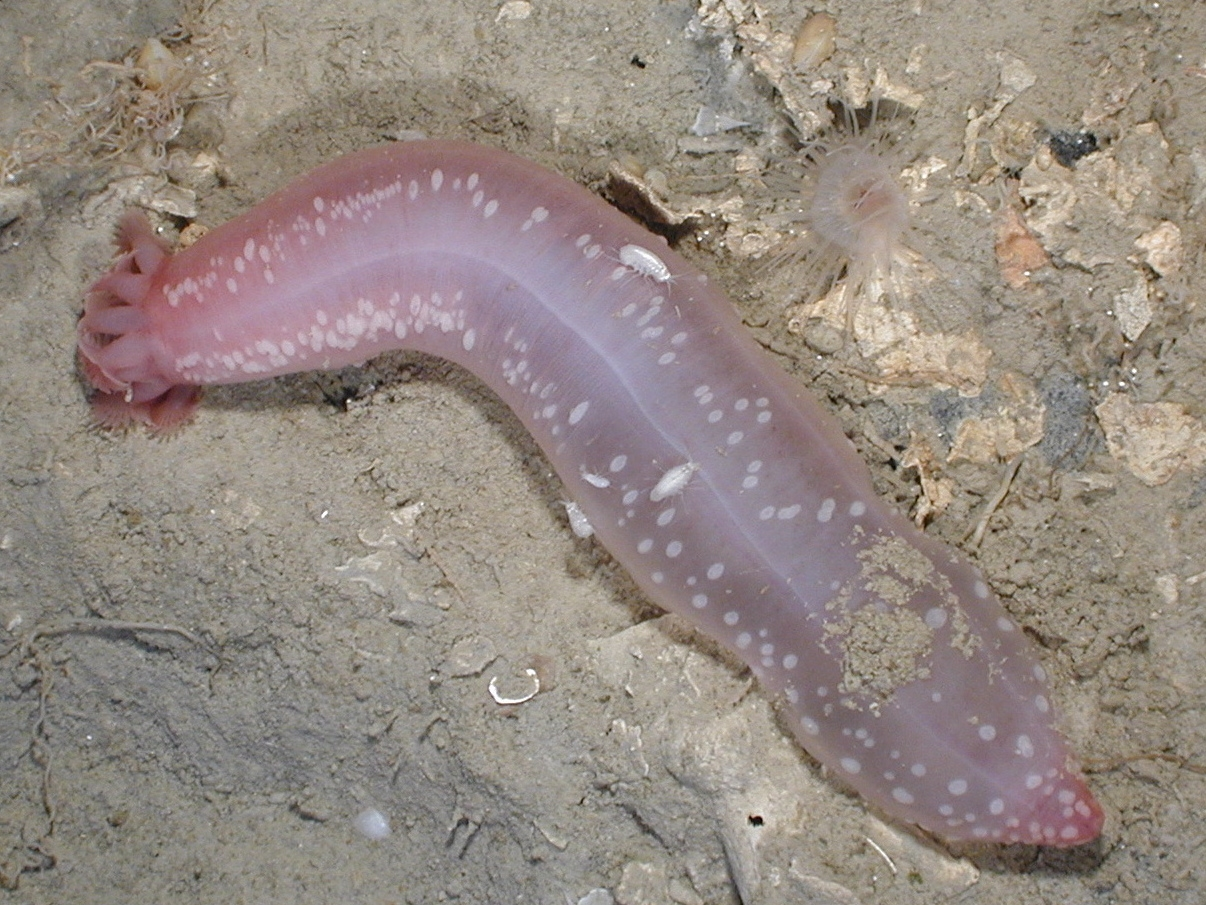
- Chiridota hydrothermica

Scientific classification
- Kingdom: Animalia
- Phylum: Echinodermata
- Class: Holothuroidea
- Order: Apodida
- Family: Chiridotidae; Östergren, 1898

Genera
- see Taxonomy

= Chiridotidae =

Family of sea cucumbers

Chiridotidae is a family of sea cucumbers found in the order Apodida. Within the family, there are 16 recognized genera all with different ranges of body types and functions. Sea cucumbers play a fundamental role in many marine ecosystems.

== Description ==
Members in this family have 10, 12, or 18 pelto-digitate tentacles. They lack podia, radial canals, a respiratory tree, and papillae. However, their body structure does include ossicles, tentacles, a calcareous ring, and a ciliary urn.

Chiridotidae typically undergo direct development and can usually be found in benthic ecosystems. Within their benthic systems they feed off of detritus meaning they must have a digestive tract.

== Taxonomy ==
The following genera are recognised in the family Chiridotidae:

- Archedota O'Loughlin in O'Loughlin & VandenSpiegel, 2007 -- 1 species
- Chantalia Martins & Souto, 2020 -- 1 species
- Chiridota Eschscholtz, 1829 -- 37 species
- Gymnopipina Souto & Martins in Souto et al., 2017 -- 1 species
- †Jumaraina Soodan, 1973 -- 6 species
- Kolostoneura Becher, 1909-- 2 species
- Neotoxodora Liao, Pawson & Liu, 2007 -- 1 species
- Ovalidota Pawson, 2004 -- 1 species
- †Palaeotrochodota Reich, 2003 -- 2 species
- Paradota Ludwig & Heding, 1935 -- 4 species
- Polycheira H.L. Clark, 1908 -- 2 species
- Psammothuria Rao, 1968 -- 1 species
- Rowedota O'Loughlin & VandenSpiegel, 2010 -- 7 species
- Scoliorhapis Clark, 1946 -- 7 species
- Sigmodota Studer, 1876 -- 4 species
- Taeniogyrus Semper, 1867 -- 30 species
- †Theelia Schlumberger, 1890 -- 7 species

There is a subfamily of Chiridotidae, Chiridotinae, that is classified by the absence of an even number of tentacles.

== Development ==
During the developmental stages of Chiridotidae, the gastrula develops directly into the doliolaria larvae, with no Auricularia stage, this means that they typically undergo direct development. Direct development allows for the internal brooding of their young within the coelom or ovaries. They gain their nutrition during developmental stages through a Lecithotrophic pathway, which is made easier by their benthic habitat during these stages. Researchers have discovered that Chiridotidae reach their asymptotic range size at 10 cells.

== Environment ==
Sea cucumbers are a mostly nocturnal animals. It has been found that they are dependent on light for the regulation of body processes.

In the family Chiridotidae, there are roughly 110 identifiable species. Chiridotidae can be found worldwide. Although they develop in benthic ecosystems they can be found anywhere in the ocean once they are fully matured. Different species have adapted to the harsh conditions of deep-sea life, but because they primarily feed off detritus, they do not starve. Chiridotidae is specifically known for burrowing into the seafloor.

== Body ==
Chiridotids have a very thin, mostly transparent body wall. There is an amino acid peptide called Stichopin that affects the stiffness in the body wall, connective tissues, and the contraction of muscles. They often range in lengths from a few millimeters to up to 3 meters. Because they lack podia, they also lack sensory cups.

The only remnants of a skeleton within this family of sea cucumbers are the calcareous ring, microscopic sclerites within the body wall, sometimes the walls of internal organs, and the tentacles that surround the organism's mouth. However, the sclerites are absent in some genera of Chiridotidae (ex. Kolostoneura and Paradota).

=== Connective Tissues ===
Sea cucumbers have a number of connective tissues that suspend their organs. Cells that contain the amino acid peptide, Stichopin, have been found within the connective tissues of the Chiridotidae. These tissues perform in catch and autonomy manifestations. The muscles that undergo catch manifestations exhibit reversible stiffening and softening properties. The muscles that undergo autonomy manifestations exhibit irreversible softening allowing for the loss of body parts.

The digestive system is anchored to the body wall by mediodorsal mesentery muscles. When sea cucumbers go through an autonomic loss of an organ, it regrows from the muscles that anchor them to the body wall. This process starts with the thickening of the muscle along the mesentery edge. Then the new organ arises from these thick places along the muscle.

Mesenteries are made up of a coelomic epithelium layer that lies over a layer of muscles, this is known as the mesothelium. The mesothelium is separated from the inner connective tissue layer by the basal lamina.

=== Ossicles ===
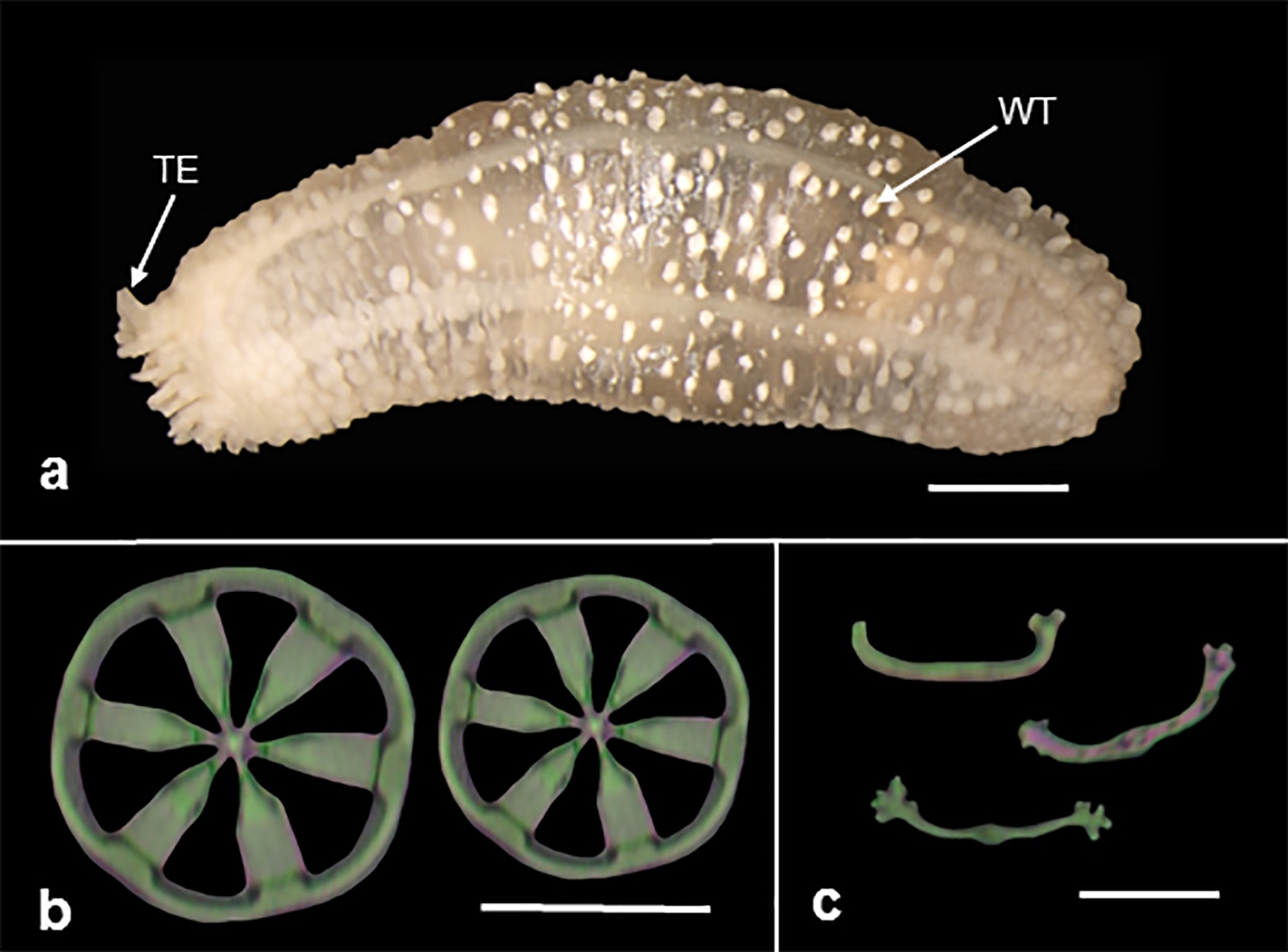
Chiridota rotifera a. dorsal view of animalb. wheel ossicle from body wallc. rods from body wall

Ossicles are generally wheel-shaped with six spokes. Ossicles have rods, hooks, denticles, and miliary granules. Many have even developed elaborate wheel and anchor-shaped ossicles contained in the body wall. The denticles are located on the inner rim and complex hub of the ossicles. On the lower side of the ossicles the denticles branch to the lower side of the hub and it forms a star-shape in the center. In the genus Chiridota, the ossicles attached to the body wall often occur in small clusters that are adjacent to the radii. Some genera of Chiridotidae are thought to have lost their body wall ossicles independently.

Hooks can only be found in three living genera of Chiridotidae: Taeniogyrus, Scoliorhapis, and Trochodota. In these genera, the ossicles are curved to form a loop, or eye.

Wheel ossicles located in Chiridotidae contain numerous tiny teeth. For example, the Myriotrochid genus has teeth located in the inner margin and they can be either large and pronounced or completely absent.

=== Calcareous Ring ===
The calcareous ring is made up of many small plates bound together by connective tissues. The radial plates contain a deep notch on the upper side of the ring. In Chiridotidae the ring is composed of dense labyrinthic stereom, that is thickest in the center of the plate. The stereom in this family is more porous than other families of sea cucumber.

The ring provides structural integrity in these animals by providing support to the pharynx, tentacles, water vascular system, and the radial nerve ring. Calcareous rings also serve as a point of insertion for the retractor muscle bands.

The genus Gymnopipina has short anterior projections in the calcareous ring and a madreporite sitting at the end of the long stone canal that has allowed scientists to classify it in the family Chiridotidae.

=== Ciliary Urns ===
Ciliary urns are a coelomic organ that gathers and excretes waste. It is thought that it aids in immunity. The Ciliary urn can also be called ciliated funnels or vibratile urnae.

The echinoderm immune system has components of cellular and humoral defenses. Cellular defense comprises various types of coelomocytes with humoral defenses mediated by numerous immune-specific molecules. Invertebrate immunity is an innate defense.

Ciliary urns have a cornucopia-shaped body and an invaginated ciliary field that collects and accumulates coelomocytes. They also take up waste materials from the coelom and dispose of them by deposition or release through the body wall.

Ciliary urns vary in shape, size, and arrangement among species. Because ciliary urns run up the entire length of adult sea cucumbers, it is known that the urns are not associated with digestion, but rather they serve an excretory role in the immune system.

The development and formation of the urn is still unknown; however, its function is clear.

=== Movement ===
All families within Apodida do not have tube feet, including the Chiridotidae. More recent studies have proven that anchors are important for movement. Other body parts used for movement include; the body wall, tentacles, papillae, and dermal ossicles. Apodids in general usually use peristaltic movements to navigate around the seafloor. Because of the lack of podia, tube feet, it is assumed that species use their anchors to hold onto the substratum.

=== Tentacles ===
In the family Chiridotidae, the tentacles around the mouth are forked. For species within the family, there are always an even number of tentacles, except for in the subfamily Chiridotinae. Tentacles are present in order to help the sea cucumbers guide food into their mouths.

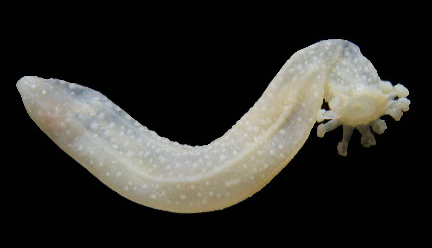

The movement of tentacles changes with the movement of the water. There are two different responses to flow rheotaxis response, direct, and rheokinesis response, non-direct.

== Feeding ==
Sea cucumbers within the family Chiridotidae, feed on benthic sediments causing a change within the stability and stratification of the sediment. The benthic sediments that they consume as food contain fungal, bacterial, and detrital organic matter. The availability of food is the main driver for the Chiridotidae to move around the seafloor.

There are two different feeding strategies that have been observed; those that conduct a continuous search for food and those that shelter during periods when they reduce feeding activity.

Amongst all sea cucumbers, tentacles are linked to the mode of feeding conducted by the organism. The structure and type of feeding is different within even a species of sea cucumber.

When collecting food the sea cucumbers extend their tentacles out to grab the particles.

== Behavior ==
The Chiridotidae are a nocturnal family and because of this they contain light avoidance behaviors. This is behavior is thought to be a response to predation. Tentacles respond to changes in light at a molecular level, the response shown as a full body contraction when exposed.

The rheotaxis response of their tentacles to water flow allows for muscles to turn when activated. During the rheokinesis response is a random movement in the water.

The burrowing behavior of sea cucumbers within the family Chiridotidae is effected by the salinity and temperature of the water around them.

It has been observed by many researchers that abundance of sea cucumbers is affected by the moon phases. Specifically, Chiridotidae are spotted in larger groups closer to a new moon than when it is not a new moon, it is thought that this is due to the lack of light.
