= Initial D (disambiguation) =

Initial D is a manga by Shuichi Shigeno which has been adapted into a long-running anime series.

Initial D may also refer to:

- Initial D (film)
- Initial D Arcade Stage, a racing game series developed by Sega Rosso based on the Initial D series
- Initial D Extreme Stage, a racing game for the PlayStation 3 by Sega, based on Version 4 of the arcade series
- Initial D: Street Stage, a racing game for the PlayStation Portable by Sega, based on Version 3 of the arcade series
