= Subaru (disambiguation) =

Subaru is a Japanese automobile brand of Subaru Corporation.

Subaru may also refer to:

- Subaru Corporation
- Subaru (literary magazine), published in Japan from 1909 to 1913
- Subaru (name), a Japanese given name
- Subaru (telescope), a telescope in Hawaii operated by the National Astronomical Observatory of Japan
- "Subaru", a song by Shinji Tanimura
- Subaru, a Japanese term for the Pleiades
- Theatre Company Subaru, a theatre company
- Patrick Star, a fictional character from SpongeBob SquarePants, known as Subaru in an internet meme

== See also ==
- Subartu, an ancient region in Upper Mesopotamia
- Subaru and Subaru, a Japanese manga series by Shuichi Shigeno
