= MF Ghost =

Japanese manga series

- First tankōbon volume cover, featuring Kanata Katagiri and the Toyota 86 (ZN6)

MFゴースト (Emu Efu Gōsuto)
- Genre: Sports
- Manga
- Written by: Shuichi Shigeno
- Published by: Kodansha
- English publisher: NA: Kodansha USA (digital)
- Imprint: Young Magazine KC
- Magazine: Weekly Young Magazine
- Original run: September 4, 2017 – February 17, 2025
- Volumes: 23
- Anime television series
- Directed by: Tomohito Naka
- Written by: Kenichi Yamashita
- Music by: Akio Dobashi
- Studio: Felix Film
- Licensed by: Crunchyroll: SA/SEA: Medialink
- Original network: Tokyo MX, RKB, TV Aichi, ytv, Animax; BS11 (S1 & 2); BS NTV, SBS (S3)
- Original run: October 2, 2023 – present
- Episodes: 37
- Preceded by
- Initial D (1995–2013)
- Sequel
- Subaru and Subaru (2025–present)
- icon

MF Ghost (Japanese: MFゴースト, Hepburn: Emu Efu Gōsuto) is a Japanese manga series written and illustrated by Shuichi Shigeno. It is a sequel to Initial D, and it also focuses on the Japanese street racing scene. It was serialized Kodansha's seinen manga magazine Weekly Young Magazine from September 2017 to February 2025, with its chapters collected in 23 tankōbon volumes.

An anime television series adaptation by Felix Film aired its first season from October to December 2023; a second season aired from October to December 2024; a third season aired from January to March 2026; a fourth and final season has been announced.

The series was followed by Subaru and Subaru, which started in July 2025.

== Plot ==
The series takes place in 202X, where self-driving electric cars have replaced internal combustion ones. However, in Japan, there is a large organization called MFG, founded by Ryosuke Takahashi (from the Initial D series), that is focused exclusively on street racing with internal combustion cars. Kanata Rivington (カナタ・リヴィントン, Kanata Rivūinton), a 19-year-old Japanese-British man who is competing under the pseudonym Kanata Katagiri (片桐 夏向, Katagiri Kanata), has shown up on the scene driving a Toyota 86. He manages to work his way through the ranks of MFG, beating top-tier cars such as the Lamborghini Huracán LP 610-4, Ferrari 488 GTB, Lotus Exige, Alfa Romeo 4C and Porsche 911 Carrera (991). Kanata has been trained by legendary downhill and rally racer Takumi Fujiwara (the protagonist of the Initial D series) at the Royal Donington Racing School in the UK and is a Formula 4 world champion. He has only one motive: to find his long-lost father.

== Media ==
=== Manga ===
Written and illustrated by Shuichi Shigeno, MF Ghost was serialized in Kodansha's seinen manga magazine Weekly Young Magazine from September 4, 2017, to February 17, 2025. The series is a sequel to Shigeno's manga series Initial D. Kodansha collected its chapters in 23 tankōbon volumes, released from January 5, 2018, to June 6, 2025.

Kodansha USA and Comixology published the 23 volumes digitally from January 11, 2022, to November 18, 2025. Kodansha added it to its K Manga online platform in May 2023.

A sequel series by Shigeno, titled Subaru and Subaru, started in Weekly Young Magazine on July 22, 2025.

==== Volumes ====
No.	Original release date	Original ISBN	English release date	English ISBN
1	January 5, 2018	978-4-06-510707-2	January 11, 2022	978-1-63699-432-1
1. "Challenger from England" (英国からの挑戦者(チャレンジャー), Eikoku kara no charenjā); 2. "A Memorable Photo" (思い出の写真, Omoide no shashin); 3. "Three Days to Kanata's Entry" (カナタ出走まであと3日, Kanata shussō made ato san nichi); 4. "Two Days to Kanata's Entry" (カナタ出走まであと2日, Kanata shussō made ato ni nichi); 5. "One Day to Kanata's Entry" (カナタ出走まであと1日, Kanata shussō made ato ichi nichi); 6. "The 86 Launches!" (86号車 出撃！！, Hachi-roku gō-sha shutsugeki!!); 7. "Focus Flag" (注目フラグ, Chūmoku furagu); 8. "The Shocking New MFG Generation" (衝撃のMFG新世代, Shōgeki no MFG shin sedai); 9. "The Downhill Specialist's Pedigree" (下り(ダウンヒル)スペシャリストの系譜, Daunhiru supesharisuto no keifu); 10. "The Ghost-Town Death Zone" (ゴーストタウンの死神, Gōsuto taun no shinigami)
2	May 7, 2018	978-4-06-511451-3	January 11, 2022	978-1-63699-433-8
11. "Déjà vu" (デジャヴー, Dejavū); 12. "Top Gear" (トップギア, Toppu gia); 13. "The Kamaboko Straight" (カマボコストレート, Kamaboko sutorēto); 14. "Eighty-Sixed" (泣さっ面にハチ, Sammen ni hachi); 15. "The Promise" (約束, Yakusoku); 16. "Ren in Love" (恋する恋(まぎらわしい), Koisuru magirawashī); 17. "The Yaji-Kita Gang" (ヤジキタ兄妹, Yajikita kyōdai); 18. "Signal Blue" (シグナルブルー, Shigunaruburū); 19. "Tire Management" (タイアマネジメント, Taiyamanejimento); 20. "Teamwork" (連携プレー, Renkei purē); 21. "The Angels' Job" (エンジェルスのお仕事, Enjerusu no oshigoto); 22. "Like Cats and Dogs" (犬猿の仲, Ken'en no naka)
3	September 6, 2018	978-4-06-512819-0; 978-4-06-513567-9 (LE)	January 11, 2022	978-1-63699-434-5
23. "Beyond Comprehension" (理解不能, Rikai funō); 24. "A Career Revealed" (明かされる経歴, Akasa reru keireki); 25. "A Tragic Rallyist" (悲運のラリースト, Hiun no rarīsuto); 26. "The Carrera Loses" (カレラの敗北, Karera no haiboku); 27. "Battle of the Long Straight" (ロングストレートの攻防, Rongusutorēto no kōbō); 28. "Exchanging Jabs" (どつきあい, Do tsukiai); 29. "The Three-Stage Rocket" (3段ロケット, 3-Dan roketto); 30. "The Man in Car #4" (4号車の男, 4 Gōsha no otoko); 31. "The Incident in Car #9" (9号車の異変, 9 Gōsha no ihen); 32. "The Race Begins to Move" (動きはじめる, Ugoki hajimeru); 33. "War of Attrition" (消耗戦, Shōmō-sen); 34. "Katagiri Kanata Full Throttle" (片桐夏向フルスロットル, Katagiri Natsu kō Furusurottoru)
4	January 4, 2019	978-4-06-514160-1; 978-4-06-514770-2 (LE)	January 11, 2022	978-1-63699-435-2
35. "The Flag Again" (フラグ再び, Furagu futatabi); 36. "Teleporting" (瞬間移動, Shunkan idō); 37. "Let's Fall in Love" (恋をしようよ, Koi o shiyō yo); 38. "The Voice Callout" (音声カウント, Onsei kaunto); 39. "The Simulation" (シミュレーション, Shimyurēshon); 40. "A Vital Flaw" (重大な欠点, Jūdaina ketten); 41. "Two Routes" (2つのルート, 2 Tsu no rūto); 42. "The 185-MPH Dogfight" (300キロのドッグファイト, 300-Kiro no doggufaito); 43. "The Last Leg" (最終局面, Saishū kyokumen); 44. "The Grand Finale" (フィナール, Fināru); 45. "Peaceful Days" (平和な日常, Heiwana nichijō); 46. "The Update" (アップデート, Appudēto)
5	May 7, 2019	978-4-06-515459-5; 978-4-06-515460-1 (LE)	January 11, 2022	978-1-63699-436-9
47. "I Got a Job" (バイト始めました, Baito hajimemashita); 48. "Okuyama's Skills" (奥川の手腕, Okugawa no shuwan); 49. "The Shakedown" (シェイクダウン, Sheikudaun); 50. "Qualifier Day 1" (予選1日目, Yosen 1-nichi-me); 51. "Seventeen Complex" (セブンテイ一ンコンプレツクス, Sebuntein konpurekkusu); 52. "Genius Awakened" (天才覚醒, Tensai kakusei); 53. "Inherited Senses" (うけっがれた感覚, Ukeggareta kankaku); 54. "The Rainy Day" (雨の1日, Ame no 1-nichi); 55. "The Night Before" (出走前夜, Shussō zen'ya); 56. "The Thrown Kiss" (投げキツス, Nage kitsusu); 57. "The White Reaper Descends" (舞いおちる白い死神, Mai ochiru shiroi shinigami); 58. "The Wizards" (魔術師, Majutsu-shi)
6	September 6, 2019	978-4-06-516937-7; 978-4-06-516990-2 (LE)	January 11, 2022	978-1-63699-437-6
59. "Qualified" (クオリフアイ, Kuorifuai); 60. "Ten-don" (テンドン, Tendon); 61. "The Pride of a Ruler" (王者のプライド, Ōja no puraido); 62. "Shirasu-don" (シラスドン, Shirasudon); 63. "The Rainy Gloom" (雨の憂うつ, Ame no yūutsu); 64. "The 4x4 Attack" (4WDの攻勢, 4WD no kōsei); 65. "The Malicious Reaper" (凶悪な死神, Kyōakuna shinigami); 66. "Kanata vs. Ohtani" (カナタ vs. 大谷, Kanata vs. Ōtani); 67. "Aiba vs. Yanagida" (相葉 vs. 柳田, Aiba vs. Yanagida); 68. "Kanata vs. Taylor" (カナタ vs. テイラー, Kanata vs. Teirā); 69. "The Electronics" (電子デバイス, Denshi debaisu); 70. "The Relay Straight Yin-Yang" (駅伝ストレートの明と暗, Ekiden sutorēto no meitoan)
7	January 6, 2020	978-4-06-518212-3	January 11, 2022	978-1-63699-438-3
71. "Winds of Fortune" (神風, Kamikaze); 72. "Kouki Sawatari, the Demon God" (鬼神!! 沢渡 光輝, Kishin!! Sawatari Kōki); 73. "Kanata vs. Sakamoto" (カナタ vs. 坂本, Kanata vs. Sakamoto); 74. "The Huracan Drops Out" (ウラカン脱落, Urakan datsuraku); 75. "The One-Car Sandwich Formation" (ひとりサンドイツチフオ一メーシヨン, Hitori sandoitsuchi fuo ichi mēshiyon); 76. "Kaito Akaba's Grudge" (赤羽 海人のうっ憤, Akaba Kaito no uppun); 77. "Fuujin Ishigami Crashes" (石神風神 撃墜, Ishigami Fūjin gekitsui); 78. "The Race for Third Heats Up" (動きはじめる3位グループ, Ugoki hajimeru 3-i gurūpu); 79. "A Cruel Reality" (残酷な現実, Zankokuna genjitsu); 80. "The Zero Academy's Problem Child" (ゼロアカデミ一の劣等生, Zeroakademi ichi no rettō-sei); 81. "The Devil of Ashinoko Skyline" (芦ノ湖スカイラインの悪麿, Ashinoko sukairain no waru maro); 82. "The Voice Callout Returns" (音声カウント再ぴ, Onsei kaunto sai pi)
8	May 7, 2020	978-4-06-519539-0; 978-4-06-519540-6 (LE)	January 11, 2022	978-1-63699-439-0
83. "Kanata vs. Kaito Akaba" (カナタ vs. 赤羽海人, Kanata vs. Akabane Kaito); 84. "Ryuji Ikeda Reminisces" (池田竜吹 語る, Ikeda Ryūji kataru); 85. "Escape! And Resurgence" (脱出!! そして再加速, Dasshutsu!! Soshite sai kasoku); 86. "Pitched Battle in the Woods" (林問区間の死闘, Hayashi toi kukan no shitō); 87. "Lonesome Cowboy" (ロンサムカウポ一イ, Ronsamukaupoi); 88. "A Multitude of Dramas" (それぞれのドラマ, Sorezore no dorama); 89. "Impregnable" (難攻不落, Nankōfuraku); 90. "Free-for-All" (激闘, Gekitō); 91. "The Conclusion" (決着, Ketchaku); 92. "A New Challenger" (新たなる参戦, Aratanaru sansen); 93. "Summer Footsteps" (夏の足音, Natsu no ashioto); 94. "The Rival" (好敵手, Kōtekishu)
9	September 4, 2020	978-4-06-520686-7	January 11, 2022	978-1-63699-440-6
95. "Women Don't Understand" (女はそれを理解しない, On'na wa sore o rikai shinai); 96. "Regarding Gunma" (群馬のコト, Gunma no koto); 97. "The Family Dining Table" (家族の食卓, Kazoku no shokutaku); 98. "The Turbo Engine" (ターボエンジン, Tāboenjin); 99. "The Peninsula Opens" (ザ・ペニンシユラ開幕, Za peninshiyura kaimaku); 100. "The Land of Sun and Water" (太陽と水の国, Taiyō to mizu no kuni); 101. "Lucky or Unlucky?" (御守りは災いのもと, Omori wa wazawai no moto); 102. "Unstoppable" (快進撃, Kaishingeki); 103. "Proof of Genius" (天才の証明, Tensai no shōmei); 104. "Kouki Sawatari's Spirit" (沢渡光輝の意地, Sawatari Koki no iji); 105. "Downsizing" (ダウンサイジング, Daunsaijingu); 106. "Gunma Pride" (群馬プライド, Gunma puraido)
10	January 6, 2021	978-4-06-522013-9	January 11, 2022	978-1-63699-441-3
107. "The Second Lucky Charm" (ふたつめの御守り, Futatsu-me no omori); 108. "The Do-or-Die Dive" (決死のグイブ, Kesshi no guibu); 109. "The Cost of Courage" (勇気の代償, Yūki no daishō); 110. "A Bitter Decision" (苦渋の選択, Kujū no sentaku); 111. "Drop Out" (脱落, Datsuraku); 112. "Where is He?" (奴はどこだ!?, Yatsu wa dokoda!?); 113. "Sour Grapes" (負け犬の遠吠え, Makeinu no tōboe); 114. "Worse and Worse" (ジリ貧, Jirihin); 115. "Kanata vs. Takuya Yanagida" (カナタ vs. 柳田拓也, Kanata vs. Yanagida Takuya); 116. "Fast Everywhere!" (どこでも速い!!, Doko demo hayai!!); 117. "Left-Foot Brake" (左足プレーキ, Hidariashi burēki); 118. "I'm Going Ahead!" (先に行くぜ!!, Saki ni iku ze!!)
11	May 6, 2021	978-4-06-523334-4	March 7, 2023	978-1-68491-843-0
119. "Wataru Akiyama Speaks" (秋山渉 語る, Akiyama Wataru kataru); 120. "Sena's Charge" (瀬名の快進撃, Sena no kaishingeki); 121. "Go, Go!" (イケイケ, Ikeike); 122. "Changes" (転, Ten); 123. "Return of the Miracle" (奇跡の復活, Kiseki no fukkatsu); 124. "Fireball" (火の玉, Hi no tama); 125. "The Kamikaze Charge" (カミカゼの蕾起, Kamikaze no tsubomi okoshi); 126. "The Race Begins to Move" (動きはじめるレース, Ugoki hajimeru rēsu); 127. "The Killer Blow" (必殺の一撃, Hissatsu no ichigeki); 128. "Three-Way Struggle" (三つ巴, Mitsudomoe); 129. "Monster of the Streets" (公道の魔物, Kōdō no mamono); 130. "Fujin Ishigami Shot Down!" (石神風神 撃墜!!, Ishigami Fūjin gekitsui!!)
12	September 6, 2021	978-4-06-524746-4	April 4, 2023	978-1-68491-881-2
131. "Into the Final Lap" (ファイナルラップ突入, Fainarurappu totsunyū); 132. "The Shuffle" (シヤッフル, Shiyaffuru); 133. "The Yin and Yang of the Peninsula Zone" (半島区間の明と暗, Hantō kukan no meitoan); 134. "Kaito Akaba's Misery" (赤羽海人 無惨, Akaba Kaito muzan); 135. "Dark Clouds" (暗雲, An'un); 136. "The Gutter" (溝, Mizo); 137. "Side by Side" (並走, Heisō); 138. "Michael Gets Serious" (ミハイルの本気, Mihairu no honki); 139. "Kouki Sawatari's Error" (沢渡光輝の誤算, Sawatari Koki no gosan); 140. "Déjà Vu" (既視感, Kishikan); 141. "Their First Kiss" (2人のファーストキス, 2-Ri no fāsutokisu); 142. "Ask it to Yourself" (自分のムネに聞いてみろ, Jibun no mune ni kiite miro)
13	January 6, 2022	978-4-06-526477-5	May 2, 2023	978-1-68491-926-0
143. "Summer's Here" (夏 来ちゃいました, Natsu kichaimashita); 144. "Beech Trees" (ブナの木, Buna no ki); 145. "Grandma's Kei Truck" (おばあちゃんの軽トラ, Obāchan no Kei Tora); 146. "Catch the Oniyanma!" (オニヤンマを捕まえろ!!, Oniyanma o tsukamaero!!); 147. "Kaede" (楓); 148. "Sudden News" (突然の訃報, Totsuzen no fuhō); 149. "The 1:09 P.M. Miracle" (13峙09分の奇跡, Jūsanji ku-fun no kiseki); 150. "Report to Heaven" (天国への報告, Tengoku e no hōkoku); 151. "I'll Join You" (オレも行く, Ore mo iku); 152. "Beach Trips Hurt" (海水浴は痛いです, Kaisuiyoku wa itaidesu); 153. "The Essence of Gunma Pride" (群馬プライドの真驚, Gunma puraido no ma odoroki); 154. "The Second English Challenger" (英国から2人目の挑戦者, Igirisu kara 2 hitome no chōsen-sha)
14	May 6, 2022	978-4-06-527778-2	June 6, 2023	978-1-68491-960-4
155. "Sea of Miracles" (奇跡の海, Kiseki no umi); 156. "What Englishmen Want" (英国人男子のツボ, Eikokujin danshi no tsubo); 157. "The End of Summer" (夏の終わり, Natsu no owari); 158. "Sparks Fly" (火花バチバチ, Hibana bachibachi); 159. "The Strom-Calling Super Lap" (嵐を呼ぶスーパーラップ, Arashi o yobu sūpā rappu); 160. "You're My Friend" (おまえは友達だ, Omae wa tomodachida); 161. "Kyoko and Shun" (京子と瞬, Kyōko to Shun); 162. "Cloudy Skies" (くもり空, Kumori sora); 163. "The Red Bullet" (赤い弾丸, Akai dangan); 164. "Hair's-Breadth Battle" (僅差の攻防, Kinsa no kōbō); 165. "Attack the Jumping Spot" (ジャンピングスポットを攻めろ, Janpingusupotto o semero); 166. "Unconsciously" (無意識, Muishiki)
15	September 6, 2022	978-4-06-529070-5	July 4, 2023	979-8-88933-025-7
167. "The Attention-Grabbing Newcomer" (注目のニューカマー, Chūmoku no nyūkamā); 168. "The Beautiful Beast" (美しき野獣, Utsukushiki yajū); 169. "Angel Number" (エンジェルナンバー, Enjeru nanbā); 170. "Gunma Pride Comes Back" (群馬プライドのリベンジ, Gunma puraido no ribenji); 171. "Melancholy on Shichirigahama" (七里ヶ浜の憂うつ, Shichirigahama no yūutsu); 172. "The King's Impatience" (王者のあせり, Ōja no aseri); 173. "Feelings of Love" (恋する気もち, Koisuru kimochi); 174. "Smile" (スマイル, Sumairu); 175. "The Signal" (号砲, Gōhō); 176. "Big Waves" (大波乱, Dai haran); 177. "Pressure at the Top" (先頭の重圧, Sentō no jūatsu); 178. "Jumping Skills" (ジャンプの技術, Janpu no gijutsu)
16	February 6, 2023	978-4-06-530383-2	August 1, 2023	979-8-88933-089-9
179. "Nozomi and Kakeru" (ノゾミとカケル, Nozomi to Kakeru); 180. "The Strongest Train" (最強トレイン, Saikyō torein); 181. "Three Coincidences" (3つの偶然, Tsu no gūzen); 182. "The Porsche Wall" (ポルシェの壁, Porushe no kabe); 183. "The Midair Feints" (空中フェイント, Kūchū feinto); 184. "A Valuable Experience" (貴重な体験, Kichōna taiken); 185. "Sakamoto Snuffed Out" (坂本 瞬殺, Sakamoto shunsatsu); 186. "Clashing Spirits, Matching Credos" (ぶつかる闘争心とぶつけない美学, Butsukaru tōsōshin to butsukenai bigaku); 187. "The Daughter Matures" (ひとり娘の成長, Hitori musume no seichō); 188. "The Kamikaze Sunk!" (カミカゼ 撃沈!!, Kamikaze gekichin!!); 189. "This Sucks..." (やだねえ･･, Yadane e･･); 190. "The Artist" (芸術家, Geijutsuka)
17	June 6, 2023	978-4-06-532029-7	October 3, 2023	979-8-88933-180-3
191. "The Truce is Off" (協定解消, Kyōtei kaishō); 192. "The Cruel Baptism" (残酷な洗礼, Zankokuna senrei); 193. "The Unlucky Championship" (縁起悪い決定戦, Engi warui kettei-sen); 194. "The Lead Group Splits" (先頭グループの分裂, Sentō gurūpu no bunretsu); 195. "Nozomi Kitahara's Scheme" (北原望の策略, Kitahara Nozomi no sakuryaku); 196. "Kyoichi Sudo Goes Off Script" (須藤京一 世界に毒を吐く, Sudō Kyōichi sekai ni dokuwohaku); 197. "The Unconscious Overtake" (無意識のオーバーテイク, Muishiki no ōbāteiku); 198. "Double Lane Baptism, Part 2" (ダブルレーンの洗礼パート②, Dabururēn no senrei pāto ②); 199. "The Young German Noble vs. the Blonde English Heiress" (ドイツの貴公子 vs. 英国の金髪お嬢, Doitsu no kikōshi vs. Igirisu no kinpatsu ojō); 200. "Intense!! The Witch vs. the Machine" (壮絶!! 魔女 vs. 精密機械, Sōzetsu!! Majo vs. Seimitsu kikai); 201. "Final Lap" (ファイナルラップ, Fainarurappu); 202. "The Girl Who Refuses to Give" (あきらめない女, Akiramenai on'na)
18	October 5, 2023	978-4-06-533370-9	March 5, 2024	979-8-88933-405-7
203. "The Countdown" (カウントダウン, Kauntodaun); 204. "The Silent Advance Begins" (静かなる進撃開始, Shizukanaru shingeki kaishi); 205. "The Man Beyond" (向こう側にいる男, Mukō-gawa ni iru otoko); 206. "Absolute Monarch Panics" (慌てる絶対王者, Awateru zettai ōja); 207. "The Final Conclusion" (最終決着, Saishū ketchaku); 208. "Dropping In on Kan'ichi and Omiya" (貫一お宮もうで, Kan'ichi Omiya mōde); 209. "624"; 210. "Side Story" (番外編, Bangai-hen); 211. "Girl Talk" (女子会, Onagokai); 212. "The Newcomer" (新顏(ニューカマー), Nyūkamā); 213. "The Missing is Found" (探し物見つかる, Sagashi mono mitsukaru); 214. "Prayer for Safe Birth" (安産祈願, Anzan kigan)
19	February 6, 2024	978-4-06-534599-3	July 9, 2024	979-8-88933-621-1
215. "The Succession" (雛承, Hina-jō); 216. "Black Angel" (ブラックエンジェル, Burakkuenjeru); 217. "The Twin Prosches" (2台のポルシェ, Futai no Porushe); 218. "The Blue Bullet" (青の弾丸, Ao no dangan); 219. "Sena's Surprise" (瀬名のサプライズ, Sena no sapuraizu); 220. "The Kamikaze Outlaw" (カミカゼヤンキー, Kamikazeyankī); 221. "The Day-4 Blunder" (4日目の珍事, 4-Nichi-me no chinji); 222. "The Wondrous Gift" (すばらしいギフト, Subarashī gifuto); 223. "Downhill Specialist, Generation 2" (ダウンヒルスペシャリスト2世, Daunhirusupesharisuto 2-sei); 224. "The Executive Officer Appears" (現れたEO, Arawareta EO); 225. "New Talent" (新しい人材, Atarashī jinzai); 226. "Two Messages" (2つのメッセージ, 2Tsu no messēji)
20	June 6, 2024	978-4-06-535826-9	January 21, 2025	979-8-89478-317-8
227. "Final Day" (最終日, Saishū-bi); 228. "The King's Porsche" (王者のボルシェ, Ōja no Borushe); 229. "Michael's Slump" (ミハイルの不, Mihairu no fu); 230. "The Fourth Shot of Them" (4枚目のツーショット, 4-Mai-me no tsūshotto); 231. "The Endless Pursuit" (終わりなき追求, Owari naki tsuikyū); 232. "The Blue Signal Rush" (万感のブルーシグナル, Bankan no burūshigunaru); 233. "Inside Their Minds" (それぞれの胸中, Sorezore no kyōchū); 234. "Kamikaze in Motion" (カミカゼ働く, Kamikaze hataraku); 235. "Yaji-Kita Bonds" (ヤジキタ兄弟の絆, Yajikita kyōdai no kizuna); 236. "Do It at the Lost Ball Hairpin!" (ロストボールヘアピンで行け!!, Rosutobōruheapin de ike!!); 237. "The Perfect Sample" (ちょうどいいサンブル, Chōdo ī sanburu); 238. "Latch On to Takuya Yanagida!" (梅田拓也につけ!!, Yanagida Takuya ni tsuke!!)
21	October 4, 2024	978-4-06-537260-9	March 18, 2025	979-8-89478-432-8
239. "The Jinx" (ジンクス, Jinkusu); 240. "Kakeru Yashio Gets Angry" (八瀬理怒る, Yashio Kakeru okoru); 241. "Crazy Boys" (クレイジーボーイズ, Kureijībōizu); 242. "Harebrained" (天然, Ten'nen); 243. "An Evolving Partnership" (進化する連, Shinka suru ren); 244. "The Bump Draft" (バンプドラフト, Banpudorafuto); 245. "The White Bullet" (白い丸, Shiroi maru); 246. "Sawatari On the Move" (沢渡 働く, Sawatari hataraku); 247. "Battle at the Peak" (頂上封決, Chōjō fū ke~tsu); 248. "Marie's Wardrobe Malfunction" (まりえポロリ事件, Marie porori jiken); 249. "He's Just Naturally Popular" (モテてしまう男, Motete shimau otoko); 250. "The Fateful Hill Climb" (わけるヒルクライム, Wakeru hirukuraimu)
22	February 6, 2025	978-4-06-538461-9	July 15, 2025	979-8-89478-586-8
251. "Kanata's Irregular Lane" (変則!! カナタライン, Hensoku!! Kanatarain); 252. "Pedigree of a Genius" (天才の系譜, Tensai no keifu); 253. "Mid-Tier Moves" (中団グループの胎動, Chūdan gurūpu no taidō); 254. "#8 Spins" (8号車のスピン, 8 Gōsha no supin); 255. "Duel at Kinomiya Bridge" (来宮ガードの死闘, Kinomiya gādo no shitō); 256. "Regulations Rundown" (語られるレギュレーション, Katara reru regyurēshon); 257. "Revelation" (もたらされる情報, Motarasa reru jōhō); 258. "Sawatari vs. Beckenbauer" (沢渡 vs. ベッケンバウアー, Sawatari vs. Bekkenbauā); 259. "Car #2 Defeated" (2号車敗北, 2 Gōsha haiboku); 260. "Go Higher!" (もっと上へ!!, Motto ue e!!); 261. "Pursue the Ghost!" (ゴーストを追え!!, Gōsuto o oe!!); 262. "The Event" (異変, Ihen)
23	June 6, 2025	978-4-06-540180-4	November 18, 2025	979-8-89478-764-0
263. "Jolted Emotions" (揺れる心情, Yureru shinjō); 264. "Final Lap" (ファイナルラップ, Fainarurappu); 265. "Kanata's Choice" (カナタの選択, Kanata no sentaku); 266. "The Downhill Artist" (ダウンヒルアーティスト, Daunhiruātisuto); 267. "The Ultra-Tough Downhill Kanata Line" (超高難度 下りカナタライン, Chō kō nando-kudari Kanatarain); 268. "The Unseen Hand of God" (見えざる神の手, Miezarukami no te); 269. "#4 Goes Down" (4号車, 4 Gōsha); 270. "Overtake Denied in Kinomiya" (来宮ガードのオーバーテイク封じ, Kinomiya gādo no ōbāteiku fūji); 271. "Yaji-Kita's Final Struggle" (ヤジキタからの最終局面, Yajikita kara no saishū kyokumen); 272. "Checkered Flag" (チェッカーフラッグ, Chekkāfuraggu); 273. "The Ceremony" (セレモニー, Seremonī); 274. "Parting" (別離, Betsuri); Final Chapter "Delving Into the Future" (最終話 そして未来の話, Saishū-banashi soshite mirai no hanashi)

=== Anime ===
An anime television series adaptation was announced on January 4, 2022. It is produced by Felix Film and directed by Tomohito Naka, with Kenichi Yamashita supervising the scripts co-written by Akihiko Inari, Naoyuki Onda designing the characters, and Akio Dobashi composing the music. The series aired from October 2 to December 18, 2023, on Tokyo MX and other networks. (Note: Tokyo MX and BS11 listed the series premiere on October 1 at 24:00, which is effectively October 2 at midnight JST.) The opening song is "Jungle Fire feat. Motsu" by Yū Serizawa, while the ending song is "Stereo Sunset" by Himika Akaneya.

Following the final episode of the first season, a second season was announced, which aired from October 7 to December 23, 2024. (Note: Tokyo MX and BS11 listed the second season's premiere on October 6 at 24:00, which is effectively October 7 at midnight JST.) The opening song is "Rock Me Kiss Me feat. Motsu" by Yū Serizawa, while the ending song is "Side U (Prod. AmPm)" by Himika Akaneya.

Following the final episode of the second season, a third season was announced. It aired from January 4 to March 29, 2026. The opening song is "Timeless Power feat. Motsu" by Yū Serizawa, while the ending song is "Yokan no Tochū Prod. Taku Takahashi (m-flo)" (予感の途中 Prod. ☆Taku Takahashi (m-flo)) by Himika Akaneya.

Following the final episode of the third season, a fourth and final season was announced.

Crunchyroll is streaming the series. Medialink licensed the series in Asia-Pacific for streaming on its Ani-One Asia YouTube channel.

==== Episodes ====
===== Season 1 (2023) =====
No. overall	No. in season	Title	Directed by (Note: Production staff information is taken from the ending credits of each episode.)	Written by	Storyboarded by	Original release date
1	1	"The Challenger from England"; Transliteration: "Eikoku Kara no Charenjā" (Japanese: 英国からの 挑戦者(チャレンジャー))	Tomohito Naka	Kenichi Yamashita	Naruyo Takahashi & Tomohito Naka	October 2, 2023
Kanata Rivington travels from England to Japan to compete in the MFG motorsport competition and locate his father. He meets Ogata, a mechanic, and Shun Aiba, an older competitor in MFG, and prepares for the race. While in Japan, he stays with the Saionji family whose daughter, Ren Saionji, secretly works as an MFG Angel, the scantily-clad mascots of the MFG competition.
2	2	"Shocking New Generation of MFG"; Transliteration: "Shōgeki no MFG Shin Sedai" (Japanese: 衝撃のMFG新世代)	Masashi Abe	Kenichi Yamashita	Masashi Abe	October 9, 2023
Kanata participates in his first MFG race in the qualifying round at Odawara Pike's Peak. He instantly gains attention for his driving skills in his Toyota 86, and enters the third sector at a rapid speed which puts him in reach of the top 15 spots.
3	3	"Kamaboko Straight"; Transliteration: "Kamaboko Sutorēto" (Japanese: カマボコストレート)	Hideki Tonokatsu	Kenichi Yamashita	Hideki Tonokatsu	October 16, 2023
Kanata's Toyota 86 rapidly passes through the "death area" of the track where visibility is low, earning the attention of Fumihiro Joyu, the manager of MFG who reminisces on the driving technique of another 86 driver. In the end, Kanata finishes in sixteenth after losing ground in the long straight at the end of the race. After the race is over, Ren (as Angel Number 7) slaps him for not telling her that he was a racer, but her different hairstyle means that he did not recognise her. It is revealed that a racer in the top-15 was disqualified for using unsanctioned tires and Kanata is pushed up into fifteenth place, allowing him to participate in the race.
4	4	"Tire Management"; Transliteration: "Taiya Manejimento" (Japanese: タイヤマネジメント)	Shō Hamada	Kenichi Yamashita	Hatsuki Tsuji	October 23, 2023
Ren regrets slapping Kanata, but he was not aware that she was Angel Number 7 and so she faces no consequences. They visit Kamakura to search for where a photograph was taken of Kanata's mother and father, and Ren begins to develop stronger feelings for him. Kanata meets with the rest of the Divine 15 before beginning his race.
5	5	"Teamwork"; Transliteration: "Renkei Purē" (Japanese: 連携プレー)	Hiroshi Tamada	Akihiko Inari	Hiroki Hayashi	October 30, 2023
Kanata looks for an opportunity from the pack's rear against the 600 horsepower class monster machines. As they approach downhill, the true value of Kanata and his Toyota 86 is demonstrated again. Kanata overtakes the Honda Civic of Kazuhiro Maezono the Yajikita Siblings passed, moving up to 14th place. In front of them, Akaba in his Ferrari 488 GTB and Daigo Oishi in a Lamborghini Huracán LP 610-4 duel. Furthermore, Michael Beckenbauer in his Porsche 718 Cayman S, caught up with Fujin Ishigami in his Porsche 991 GT3, the champion of the previous year.
6	6	"The Tragic Rallyist"; Transliteration: "Hiun no Rarīsuto" (Japanese: 悲運のラリースト)	Takeshi Ando	Akihiko Inari	Naruyo Takahashi	November 6, 2023
Kanata raises to 11th place, and it was revealed that his mentor in this run was the ill-fated rally driver, Takumi Fujiwara. He faced the challenging Long Straight during the qualifiers where Aiba's GT-R and Sakamoto's Audi R8 faced in a battle between high-powered vehicles. Amidst this, Kanata chose to utilize the slipstream to slip behind the Lotus and Alfa Romeo of the Yajikita Siblings, and then dash through with a three-stage rocket.
7	7	"The Man in the 4 Car"; Transliteration: "Yon-gōsha no Otoko" (Japanese: 4号車の男)	Hideki Tonokatsu	Kenichi Yamashita	Naruyo Takahashi & Hideki Tonokatsu	November 13, 2023
Kouki Sawatari, who secured fourth place last year's race is not participating, being more focused on dating than watching the race. Kanata falls back to 13th place during the hill climb. Ogata expresses concerns about the tire management of the Toyota 86, but Kanata declares his determination to achieve a higher ranking. After engaging in repeated battles with the Yajikita Siblings, Kanata finally reaches the downhill.
8	8	"The Voice Callout"; Transliteration: "Boisu Kaunto" (Japanese: 音声(ボイス)カウント)	Takeshi Ando	Akihiro Inari	Naruyo Takahashi	November 20, 2023
All eyes are on Kanata as he plunges into the final downhill. The Toyota 86 overtakes the Yajikita Siblings and captures the Lexus of Emile Hänninen further ahead. Although the view is obscured in the death zone, Kanata relies on Ogata to keep track of the time difference with the car in front. Guided by the audio count, Kanata races through the mist, confronting unseen rivals. The clock signals with each tick, encouraging vigorousness as the gap in time narrows with each passing second.
9	9	"The 300 kph Dogfight"; Transliteration: "Jisoku Sanbyaku Kiro no Doggufaito" (Japanese: 時速300キロのドッグファイト)	Yukihiko Asaki	Kenichi Yamashita	Naruyo Takahashi & Hiroshi Tamada	November 27, 2023
Kanata achieves ninth place, overtaking Emile Hänninen and Jackson Taylor in the fog. Meanwhile, on the final Kamaboko straight, the top competitors engage at speeds exceeding 300 kph. Shun Aiba makes a painful mistake at the heat of the race. Kanata allows Taylor's Porsche to pass him as soon as they enter the straight, initiating a one-on-one braking battle at the final corner. The 86 and Porsche line up side-by-side. The long race inches closer to conclusion.
10	10	"Updates"; Transliteration: "Appudēto" (Japanese: アップデート)	Tomoe Makino	Akihiro Inari	Naruyo Takahashi & Hatsuki Tsuji	December 4, 2023
Kanata returns to his daily life. Ren tries to tell Kanata that she's MFG Angel No.7, but Ogata interferes and she misses the opportunity. Ogata had invited Hiroya Okuyama from Auto Shop Spiral to strengthen Kanata's Toyota 86. At Kanata's request, it was decided that it would be updated without touching the power unit. Okuyama could see the influence of his mentor, Takumi Fujiwara, in Kanata's attitude towards running. Kanata also started a Part Time job at SilverStone Cafe.
11	11	"The Genius Awakens"; Transliteration: "Tensai Kakusei" (Japanese: 天才覚醒)	Mistuyo Yokono	Akihiro Inari	Naruyo Takahashi	December 11, 2023
With the second round at Ashinoko GT approaching, Kanata tests the updates made to his Toyota 86. The enhancements have significantly improved its fighting power, and Kanata is impressed by Hiroya Okuyama's tuning skill. However, during the test run, a blue Alpine A110 overtakes Kanata's 86. Behind the wheel of car 4 is Kouki Sawatari, who did not participate in the last race. Kanata recalls meeting Sawatari in Europe, becoming evident that Sawatari harbors a rivalry with Kanata. As the preliminaries commence, Sawatari, hailed as a genius, begins to showcase his abilities.
12	12	"Inherited Perception"; Transliteration: "Uketsugareta Kankaku" (Japanese: うけつがれた感覚)	Shō Hamada	Kenichi Yamashita	Naruyo Takahashi	December 18, 2023
Before the round starts, Mayuko Saionji, Ren Saionji's mother, notices a certain ability in Kanata. Kanata confesses that this ability is the skill to accurately memorize images, to which he utilizes in his races. Mayuko becomes the only one who understands Kanata, as he has intentionally avoided being known by others. The sixth day of the qualifying rounds, known as the Ashinoko GT, arrives. Watched over by Ogata and Aiba, Kanata starts in his Toyota 86, racing to Sawatari's course record.

===== Season 2 (2024) =====
No. overall	No. in season	Title	Directed by	Written by	Storyboarded by	Original release date
13	1	"The White Reaper Descends"; Transliteration: "Mai Ochiru Shiroi Shinigami" (Japanese: 舞いおちる白い死神)	Michita Shiraishi	Kenichi Yamashita	Naruyo Takahashi	October 7, 2024
14	2	"The 4x4 Attack"; Transliteration: "4WD no Kōsei" (Japanese: 4WDの攻勢)	Yuhihiko Asaki	Kenichi Yamashita	Naruyo Takahashi & Hiroshi Tamada	October 14, 2024
15	3	"The Relay Straight Yin-Yang"; Transliteration: "Ekiden Sutorēto no Meitoan" (Japanese: 駅伝ストレートの明と暗)	Naruyo Takahashi	Akihiko Inari	Naruyo Takahashi	October 21, 2024
16	4	"Sawatari Koki, the Demon God"; Transliteration: "Kishin!! Sawatari Mitsuteru" (Japanese: 鬼神(きしん)！！沢渡 光輝)	Shō Hamada	Kenichi Yamashita	Naruyo Takahashi	October 28, 2024
17	5	"A Cruel Reality"; Transliteration: "Zankokuna Genjitsu" (Japanese: 残酷な現実)	Michita Shiraishi	Akihiko Inari	Naruyo Takahashi & Mei Aratani	November 4, 2024
18	6	"The Devil of Ashinoko Skyline"; Transliteration: "Ashinoko Sukairain no Akuma" (Japanese: 芦ノ湖スカイラインの悪麿)	Masashi Abe	Kenichi Yamashita	Naruyo Takahashi & Masashi Abe	November 11, 2024
19	7	"Lonesome Cowboy"; Transliteration: "Ronsamu Kauboi" (Japanese: ロンサムカウポ一イ)	Naruyo Takahashi	Akihiko Inari	Naruyo Takahashi & Kenji Setou	November 18, 2024
20	8	"The Conclusion"; Transliteration: "Ketchaku" (Japanese: 決着)	Masato Jinbo	Kenichi Yamashita	Naruyo Takahashi & Tetsurō Amino	November 25, 2024
21	9	"The Rival"; Transliteration: "Raibaru" (Japanese: 好敵手(ライバル))	Shigeki Awai	Akihiko Inari	Naruyo Takahashi & Hatsuki Tsuji	December 2, 2024
22	10	"The Peninsula Opens"; Transliteration: "Za・Peninshura Kaimaku" (Japanese: ザ・ペニンシユラ開幕)	Michita Shiraishi	Kenichi Yamashita	Naruyo Takahashi & Hatsuki Tsuji	December 9, 2024
23	11	"The Cost of Courage"; Transliteration: "Yūki no Daishō" (Japanese: 勇気の代償)	Shō Hamada	Akihiko Inari	Naruyo Takahashi & Royden B	December 16, 2024
24	12	"A Bitter Decision"; Transliteration: "Kujū no Sentaku" (Japanese: 苦渋の選択)	Naruyo Takahashi	Kenichi Yamashita	Naruyo Takahashi	December 23, 2024

===== Season 3 (2026) =====
No. overall	No. in season	Title	Directed by	Written by	Storyboarded by	Original release date (Note: Episodes are released on Prime Video and Crunchyroll three days before their televised airings.)
25	1	"Miraculous Comeback"; Transliteration: "Kiseki no Fukkatsu" (Japanese: 奇跡の復活)	Tomohito Naka	Kenichi Yamashita	Naruyo Takahashi	January 4, 2026
26	2	"Fireball"; Transliteration: "Hi no Tama" (Japanese: 火の玉)	Naruyo Takahashi	Kenichi Yamashita	Naruyo Takahashi	January 11, 2026
27	3	"Into the Final Lap"; Transliteration: "Fainaru Rappu" (Japanese: ファイナルラップ)	Naruyo Takahashi	Shō Hamada	Naruyo Takahashi	January 18, 2026
28	4	"Their First Kiss"; Transliteration: "2-Ri no Fāsutokisu" (Japanese: 2人のファーストキス)	Naruyo Takahashi	Kenichi Yamashita	Naruyo Takahashi	January 25, 2026
29	5	"Grandma's Kei Truck"; Transliteration: "Obāchan no Kei Tora" (Japanese: おばあちゃんの軽トラ)	Naruyo Takahashi	Shō Hamada	Naruyo Takahashi & Yoshino Asou	February 1, 2026
30	6	"The 1:09PM Miracle"; Transliteration: "Jūsanji Ku-fun no Kiseki" (Japanese: 13時09分の奇跡)	Kenji Setou	Kenichi Yamashita	Kenji Setou	February 8, 2026
31	7	"The End of Summer"; Transliteration: "Natsu no Owari" (Japanese: 夏の終わり)	Naruyo Takahashi	Shō Hamada	Naruyo Takahashi	February 15, 2026
32	8	"Sparks Fly"; Transliteration: "Hibana Bachibachi" (Japanese: 火花バチバチ)	Naruyo Takahashi	Shō Hamada	Naruyo Takahashi	February 22, 2026
33	9	"The Red Bullet"; Transliteration: "Akai Dangan" (Japanese: 赤い弾丸)	Tsutomu Ohno	Kenichi Yamashita	Naruyo Takahashi & Tsutomu Ohno	March 1, 2026
34	10	"The King's Impatience"; Transliteration: "Ōja no Aseri" (Japanese: 王者のあせり)	Yoshino Asou	Shō Hamada	Naruyo Takahashi & Yoshino Asou	March 8, 2026
35	11	"The Strongest Train"; Transliteration: "Saikyō torein" (Japanese: 最強トレイン)	Yoshino Asou	Kenichi Yamashita	Naruyo Takahashi	March 15, 2026
36	12	"The Midair Feint" (Note: Incorrectly titled on the Crunchyroll website as The Midair Feints.); Transliteration: "Kūchū feinto" (Japanese: 空中フェイント)	Naruyo Takahashi	Shō Hamada	Naruyo Takahashi	March 22, 2026
37	13	"The Lead Group Splits"; Transliteration: "Sentō Gurūpu no Bunretsu" (Japanese: 先頭グループの分裂)	Tomohito Naka	Kenichi Yamashita	Naruyo Takahashi	March 29, 2026

== Reception ==
By January 2019, the manga had over 1 million copies in circulation; over 3.2 million copies in circulation by January 2022; and over 4 million copies in circulation by January 2023.

Anime News Network (ANN) had four editors review the first episode of the anime: Rebecca Silverman was put off by the fan service depiction of Ren and felt disappointed with the racing being relegated to "only about thirty seconds of actual race footage"; Richard Eisenbeis felt betrayed by the lack of "awesome dirfting car races and killer eurobeat music" throughout the episode, but gave it credit for being a "solid introduction" and had decent stories involving Kanata and Ren, saying he will check out the second episode; James Beckett critiqued that "automotive-illiterate viewers" may enjoy the series through Ren and Kanata's potential romance but was unsure of its racing anime appeal based on the brief snippets it shows, saying that fanbase "will have to wait another week to get a real taste of the action." The fourth reviewer, Nicholas Dupree, was unimpressed with the "mild-mannered and matter-of-fact" main cast (outside of Ogata) but felt that viewers will get invested in them during the long run. He added that the visuals were a mixed bag, commending the details to the CG vehicles and the "distinctive character designs", but was critical of the environments being "(barely-)edited reference photos," saying "the make-or-break detail will depend on how well they can capture the speed and intensity of racing in the next episode."

Fellow ANN editor Steve Jones chose MF Ghost as his pick for the Worst Anime of Fall 2023, criticizing the "paper-thin characters, shoddy presentation, and almost nonexistent story" as compared to Overtake!, and added that it fails as a continuation to Initial D, saying "Yes, it brings the Eurobeat back, and that's absolutely the best creative decision this sequel makes. But in all other respects—setting, character, stakes, direction, storyboarding—the classic Initial D anime runs laps around this one." Monique Thomas also chose the series as her pick for the Worst Anime of 2023, feeling that the races lacked storyline stakes and contained "long technical explanations", and felt the overall production away from the tracks was "sterile with very little expression," saying, "It feels like someone took all the worst parts of Initial D and cobbled them together into one vehicle. It's a reminder that we're no longer "running in the 90s" and have left them behind a long time ago." Kennedy, also writing for ANN, reviewed the complete first season in 2024 and gave it an overall C grade, praising the racing segments but felt it lacked Initial D's "over-the-top elements" that made it fun and criticized the bland characters throughout the disjointed story, concluding that: "On its own merits, it's (no pun intended) pretty middle of the road—exciting race scenes, which are weighed down by just about everything else. Overall, I wouldn't readily call it a particularly good or bad anime. But, it's the Initial D you have at home: it may also be a racing anime set to a Eurobeat soundtrack, but it lacks the over-the-top fun of Initial D."

Kennedy reviewed the complete second season in 2025 and gave it an overall C− grade, commending the "serviceable" production and various Eurobeat-soundtracked races, but felt it was "another middle-of-the-road racing anime", criticizing the secondary storylines for lacking progression and "connective tissue" involving the central plot and said races for being repetitive and monotonous throughout the episodes, concluding that: "[T]his series is starting to drag, and I'm ready for it to reach the end of its road—which, incidentally, is in the process of happening in the manga, so at least there's that."
