= Initial D (video game series) =

- Developer: Sega
- Publisher: Sega
- Director: Isao Matsumoto
- Producer: Kenji Arai
- Composer: Hideaki Kobayashi
- Platforms: Arcade, PlayStation 2, PlayStation Portable, PlayStation 3
- Genre: Arcade racing
- Modes: Single player, online multiplayer
- Arcade system: Sega NAOMI 2 (Arcade Stage 1, 2 and 3), Lindbergh (Arcade Stage 4 and 5), RingEdge (Arcade Stage 6A, 7AA+, 8 Infinity), Nu2 (Arcade Stage Zero), ALLS UX, MX2, MX2.1 (The Arcade)

The Initial D (頭文字(イニシャル)D) video game series, known in Japan as Initial D Arcade Stage, is an arcade racing game series developed by Sega, based on the anime and manga series Initial D. In the United States and Europe, the game series is simply known as Initial D.

== Premise ==
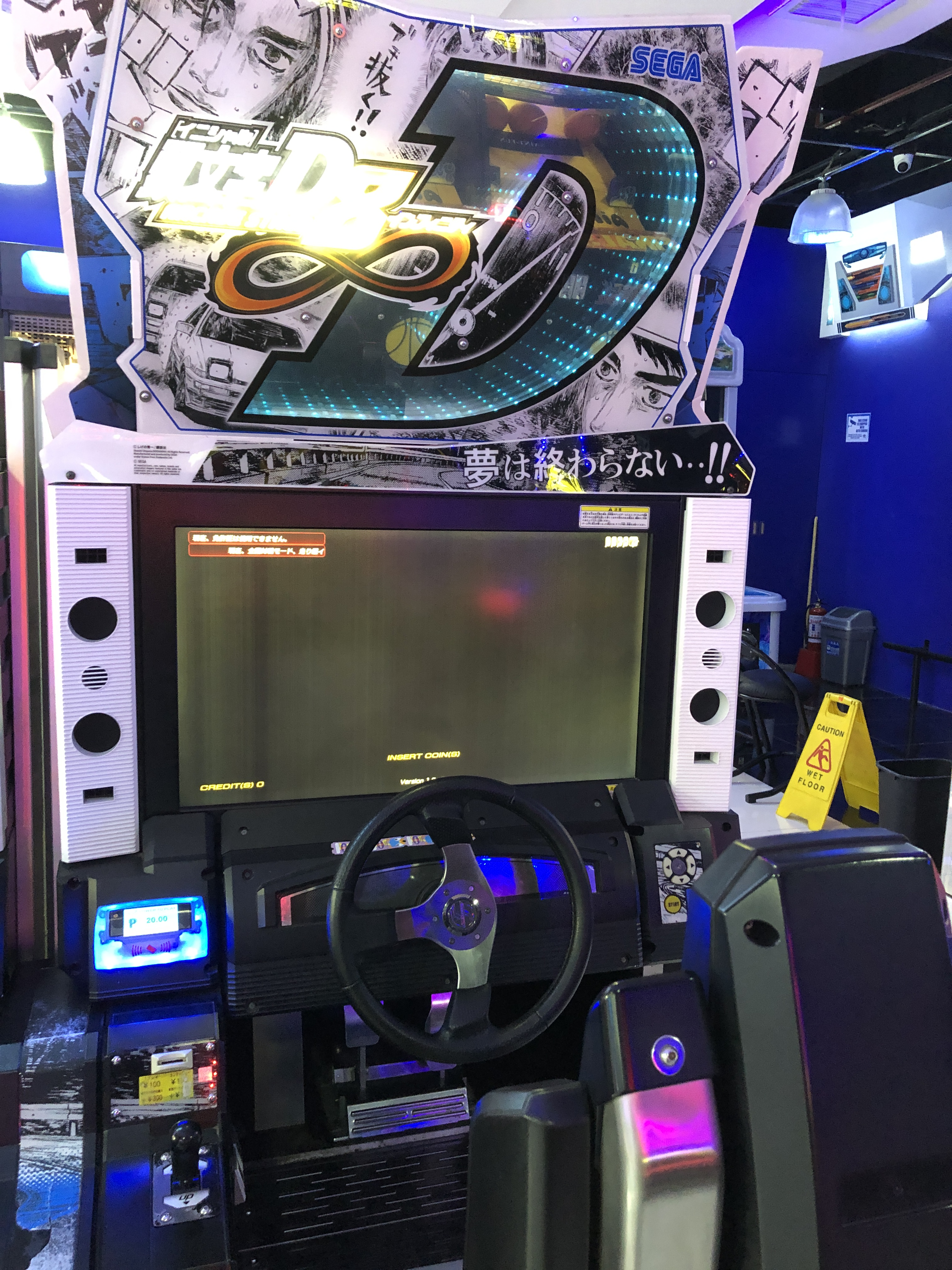
Initial D Arcade Stage 8 arcade machine in the Philippines.

In the Initial D video game franchise, players race against different opponents through various mountain passes featured in the manga. Vehicles that are featured in the game are mostly Japanese cars, such as the Nissan Skyline GT-R, Mazda RX-7, Subaru Impreza, Honda Civic, as well as the Toyota AE86. Using the optional magnetic card system (arcade installations from Arcade Stage Zero and later utilize Amusement IC, Banapassport, or Aime cards rather than dedicated magnetic cards), players can save a customized car as well as their progress for future sessions; otherwise, their game progress is deleted. Players can continue growth with their cards on another Initial D cabinet of the same version. However, the card must be renewed every 50 plays.

Resuming from another version is subject to the following conditions:

- There is no backward compatibility (i.e., a version 2 card cannot be used on a version 1 machine).
- Upgrading the card to a more recent machine is permanent.
- When upgrading from one version to another, remaining plays will be carried over, and 50 plays will be credited to the card.

This feature was not present from Arcade Stage Zero to The Arcade, however. Players with a save data on Arcade Stage Zero were rewarded with continued play benefits which included full tune tickets based on the number of cars owned that were fully tuned, up to 56 cars, titles based on the player's level, and avatar pieces, dressup tokens and avatar tokens based on the player's mileage.

Players with a save data from Sega World Driver Championship were rewarded with a full tune ticket and avatar pieces based on the driver level.

There are 13 games in the series: 10 for arcades and 3 for home consoles.

- Initial D Arcade Stage Ver.1 (Arcade)
- Initial D Arcade Stage Ver.2 (Arcade)
- Initial D Arcade Stage Ver.3 (Arcade)
- Initial D Arcade Stage 4 (Arcade)
- Initial D Arcade Stage 5 (Arcade)
- Initial D Arcade Stage 6 AA (Arcade)
- Initial D Arcade Stage 7 AAX (Arcade)
- Initial D Arcade Stage 8 Infinity (Arcade)
- Initial D Arcade Stage Zero (Arcade)
- Initial D The Arcade (Arcade)
- Initial D Special Stage (PlayStation 2)
- Initial D Street Stage (PSP)
- Initial D Extreme Stage (PS3)

== Game modes ==
Legend of the Streets
In the main story mode, players race with opponents from the manga, with their opponents increasing in difficulty during the progression of the game. In the English versions of the game, until the release of Arcade Stage 4, their names are derived from the Tokyopop manga.

Time attack
Players race in a timed game to rank highest against other players at their current machine or online. From Arcade Stage Ver.2/Special Stage to Arcade Stage 6 AA, players could change stages' weather conditions. This feature was removed from Arcade Stage 7 AAX to Arcade Stage 8 Infinity.

Bunta Challenge
First started in Arcade Stage Ver.2 to Arcade Stage Ver.3/Street Stage the player races against Bunta Fujiwara, the legendary street racer in the Initial D series. Each time Bunta is defeated, the player will gain a level, and difficulty increases. In Arcade Stage Ver.3, the player loses 1000 points upon defeat. Regardless, the end credits still roll if you win or lose to Bunta. Bunta's car differs across levels, levels 1-6: AE86 Trueno, levels 7-11: AE86 Trueno w/TRD 20-Valve 4AGE Racing Engine, levels 12-15: GC8V Subaru Impreza WRX STi Version V. This model was discontinued and removed in Arcade Stage 4/Extreme Stage. However, Bunta appeared as a final boss in Akina. It later returned in Arcade Stage 7 AAX (Only in Legend mode after clearing Rebirth mode). And soon returned in Initial D The Arcade in an update during the 20th anniversary, which can be unlocked at Street Racer Grade C9.

Online Battle
This was introduced in Arcade Stage 4/Extreme Stage, this mode allowed players to race against others located on the same continent.

Racer's Event
Introduced in Arcade Stage 5 to Arcade Stage 8 Infinity. Only two modes are included in-game such as online battle and time attack.

Tag Battle
Introduced in Arcade Stage 6 AA through to Arcade Stage 8 Infinity, this mode allows players in the same location to team up. One player drives uphill and the other downhill to race with rivals. Matches are made based on past racing results, pitting drivers with similar levels against each other. When there is a difference in the level with your tag partner, the stronger driver will match with a stronger driver, and a weaker driver with a weaker driver. The team with the highest score wins.

Project Kanto's Fastest/Operation Kanto
First introduced in Arcade Stage 7 AAX, this mode is similar to tag battle mode, where players race against the rival characters based in the manga from Gunma to Kanagawa area. In races against Project D's Ace, the courses are random. In Arcade Stage 8 Infinity, new rivals include Tohru and Atsuro in Momiji Line, Sakamoto and Wataru in Sadamine Rain, and the Lan Evo Teams in Tsuchisaka.

Theory of Streets
Introduced in a content update for The Arcade, this mode allows the players to face up to 2-3 other bots based on real players around the world on Sega's official servers. Players can choose their mentor to build their friendship with and earn rewards by beating the bots, and choose their opponents ranging from different street racer grades.

== Games versions ==
Release timeline
| 2002 | Arcade Stage |
| 2002 | Arcade Stage Version 2 |
| 2003 | Special Stage |
| 2004 | Arcade Stage Version 3 |
2005
| 2006 | Street Stage |
| 2007 | Arcade Stage 4 |
| 2008 | Extreme Stage |
| 2009 | Arcade Stage 5 |
2010
| 2011 | Arcade Stage 6 AA |
| 2012 | Arcade Stage 7 AAX |
2013
| 2014 | Arcade Stage 8 Infinity |
2015–2016
| 2017 | Arcade Stage Zero |
2018–2020
| 2021 | The Arcade |

=== Version 1 ===
Japanese version 6 July 2001, English version: 2002

Beginning with four courses such as Myogi (Night Kids' home course), Usui (Impact Blue's home course), Akina (Takumi's home course), and Happogahara (Todou School's first home course).

=== Version 2 ===
Japanese version: 10 December 2002, English version: 2002

With two new courses such as Akagi, Takahashi brothers' home course, and Irohazaka, Emperor's home course. And additional rivals such as Kenji, 2 Guys from Tokyo, Kenta Nakamura, Toru Suetsugu Kyoko Iwase, Nobuhiko Akiyama and Sakamoto.

=== Version 3 ===
Japanese version: 27 January 2004, English version: 2004

The Lan Evo Team's home course is one of the new courses, such as Akina Snow (only night), Shomaru, which was initially an exclusive for Special Stage and Tsuchisaka. Also, new opponents in the game are Tohru Suetsugu, Atsuro Kawai, Miki, and the Tsucisaka Lan Evo team. New cars featured in the game are the Mitsubishi Lancer Evolution V, Lancer Evolution VI T.M. Edition, Mazda RX-8, and the Nissan Skyline 25GT-T. The game features original Eurobeat songs from artists including Matt Land, Powerful T., Ace Warrior, and Marco Polo.

=== Stage 4 ===
Japanese Version: 21 February 2007, English version: July 2007

It is also known in the updated version (Version 1.50) as Initial D Arcade Stage 4 Kai is the fourth release in the Initial D Arcade Stage series. Unlike the first three versions of the game, the game runs on the Sega Lindbergh hardware, uses a new card system, and features a new physics system. This game was the last game to be released in the West. Only two new rivals, such as God Hand and God Foot. Competitors from previous games, such as Miki, the Tsucisaka Lan Evo team, Sakamoto, Nobuhiko Akiyama, Atsuro Kawai, and Tohru Suetsugu, have been removed. New courses such as Lake Akina, Myogi (new layout with four sections), and Tsukuba Fruit Line. Some cars featured in previous games, such as the Lancer Evolution VII and Toyota Celica have been removed. It was also the first game to feature online battles via Sega's ALL.net service and the start of its Initial D.net service only exclusive to Japan and Asia.

=== Stage 5 ===
Released on 25 February 2009 in Japan, Initial D Arcade Stage 5 was the second game in the series released on the Sega Lindbergh hardware. A few notable differences include massive physics changes. Compared to Arcade Stage 4/Extreme Stage, which used "drifting" physics, Arcade Stage 5 featured more realistic driving physics, which included tire and brake wear down. Although the tire and brake wear are not displayed anywhere in the game, experienced players can notice the difference in the change in physics as they progress in races.

New characters that appeared for the first time in the game are Kobayakawa, Satoshi Omiya, Imposter Project D, Kai Kogashiwa (R.T. Katagiri S.V.), and Hideo Minagawa. New courses such as Happogahara, which was used from Arcade Stage Ver.1 to Arcade Stage Ver.3/Street Stage (only daytime used is night) and only Extreme Stage appeared with full daytimes between day and night and Nagao, R.T. Katagiri S.V.'s home course.

=== Stage 6 AA ===
This version was released on 3 March 2011.

A new mode, Tag Battle, was introduced. Unlike its predecessor, it was released for the Sega RingEdge hardware for the first time. The game saw a change in its driving physics. Unlike Initial D Arcade Stage 5, a drift gauge and an updated tachometer were introduced to help inform players when they were drifting. The 'Legend of the Street' mode also introduced a "Rolling Start" since the story mode in Initial D Special Stage. The tachometer now informed players whether or not their speed was below the gear range. The online network was extended to support regions in which earlier versions of the game were known to be popular, finally achieving both nationwide and international matches. New cars and courses were added to the game through online updates without upgrade kits like IDAS4 1.5. The game also added a mileage system to show players their total driven mileage. Mileages could be used to redeem exclusive cars that were later available in updates. New characters that appeared for the first time in the game include Ryuji Ikeda, Hiroya Okuyama, Go Hojo, and Rin Hojo. New course such as Usui, which used from Arcade Stage Ver.1 to Arcade Stage Ver.3/Street Stage appeared with new layout, Tsubaki Line, Sadamine and Akina Snow, also appeared before in Arcade Stage Ver.3 which daytime is night change into the day.

Note: AA = Double Ace

=== Stage 7 AAX ===
Released for Sega RingEdge on 28 November 2012. Like its predecessor, the legend of the streets mode from Original and Another mode are the same as the previous one (Arcade Stage 6 A.A.) with Rebirth mode. The game is mostly a carry-over from Initial D Arcade Stage 6 A.A., including updates. New characters include Shinji Inui to complete the Sidewinder battles of Project D, also Arcade Stage Ver.2/Special Stage and Arcade Stage Ver.3/Street Stage characters such as Nobuhiko Akiyama (Rebirth), Sakamoto and Tohru Suetsugu (only in Legend) appeared in this game and rewind of Keisuke, from Project.D using Kyoko's F.D. New cars include the Toyota Sprinter Trueno 2-door and the new Toyota 86 G.T. (to replace the FT-86 prototype from the previous game). A new class of vehicles is introduced in this game called "Complete Cars." These include pre-tuned cars from several tuning shops in Japan, such as RE Amemiya. Online battles now include tag battles, allowing two in-store machines to link together and with internet access to battle against two other players in tag battles. New courses such as Tsuchisaka, which were previously used in Arcade Stage Ver.3/Street Stage also appeared, and Nanamagari, Team Spiral's home course. In this game, there are three songs which also used from Arcade Stage Ver.3/Street Stage, and only one song from Arcade Stage Ver.2/Special Stage, with new songs. The ending theme of this game is Gamble Rumble (7th Stage Version) by m.o.v.e., the first theme remix of Initial D Third Stage, Arcade Stage Ver.2/Special Stage, and Arcade Stage Ver.3.

Note: AAX = Double Ace Cross

=== Stage 8 Infinity ===
Having been released on 17 July 2014, like its predecessor, this game carries overall game modes from the previous version with a notable addition of Initial D Factory and D Coins. In Story Mode, the players can play the Team Side or Rival Side to see the Driving Training Curriculum or what mission is for each story. The game added a new feature, "1 Day 1 Time Continue," to allow players to have a free continue per day without inserting credits. New courses such as Momiji Line, for the first time in Special Stage, appeared with a new layout and Hakone, the place for a battle between Ryosuke's F.C. and Rin Hojo's R32. Arcade Stage Ver.3/Street Stage characters such as Miki, Atsuro Kawai, and The Lan Evo Teams also return. This is the last game with Japanese voice actors before Arcade Stage Zero, which does not feature voice actors anymore.

Online services for Stage 8 Infinity and Initial D.net services have been concluded since April 27, 2017.

=== Stage Zero ===
Released for the Sega Nu2 arcade system board on 7 March 2017. Unlike its predecessors, this game now uses a 6-speed gear shifter (similar to the ones found in the Wangan Midnight Maximum Tune games) as opposed to the sequential ones. The character designs are taken from New Initial D the Movie with entirely new BGMs that are rock songs from the films such as Backdraft Smiths, Clutcho, The Hug Me, The Valves, and Gekkou Green. A small number of Eurobeat songs from previous games are also featured, but have to be unlocked. The rain condition was removed as the New Initial D movies featured no race in such conditions.

Like Stage 4 (which arcade system board has changed too), several vehicles and tracks are unavailable upon launch, but are later added back through free updates later in the year. Although most of the opponents are from New Initial D the Movie series, some rivals who didn't appear in the film, such as Daiki Ninomiya, Kai Kogashiwa, Kyoichi Sudo, Kyoko Iwase, and Tomoyuki Tachi, also appeared (with film's design). As well as Kanata Katagiri, protagonist of Initial D's sequel MFGHOST.

As collaboration, which was used by Japanese Auto Magazine Hot Version (formerly known as Best Motoring), "Gunma Cycle Sports Center", where the magazine's most Touge challenges were filmed, is added along with four pre-tuned cars that appeared in the challenges.

The Version 2 update was released on 18 April 2019, and featured Shun Aiba and NISMO GT-R's 2017 Model, which appeared in MFGHOST

=== The Arcade ===
Released on the Sega ALLS MX2.1 arcade system and as upgrade kits for Initial D Arcade Stage Zero and Sega World Driver Championship on 25 February 2021, and later on 29 July 2021 outside of Japan as an export version. The game had run a location test period on 23–24 July 2020, which allowed players to play the game in its beta phase. The location test gave out an Initial D The Arcade themed Aime card and an Initial D The Arcade tachometer in the style of Arcade Stage 8 Infinity for use in Initial D Arcade Stage Zero. The game is powered by Unreal Engine 4 instead of Sega's proprietary engine used for the previous titles. Unlike the previous arcade stage games, the story mode cutscenes are presented with a manga style filter, with manga panels shown as the voice acting is absent, aside from the countdown used in the story mode and when the cabinets are set to 2-player or 4-player vs mode. Certain character models, like the ones used in the Theory of Streets, associated with the cars and used on the game's season splash screen, are reused from previous arcade stage titles. In 2023, Sega worked with Wahlap to bring Initial D: The Arcade to mainland China with full localisation.

Players who had a save file from Initial D Arcade Stage Zero or Sega World Driver Championship on their Aime card were given continued play benefits rewards which included avatar items from those games, avatar and dress-up tokens, full tune tickets depending on the number of full tuned cars the player had owned in Arcade Stage Zero or driver level in Sega World Driver Championship, and titles based on the player level in Arcade Stage Zero.

Like Arcade Stage Zero, the game launched with a small number of courses and cars, with more to be added throughout its live service. Certain collaboration events have made their return like MF Ghost, the Touhou Project featuring extra characters for the events and Hot Version. New collaboration events have occurred with Wangan Midnight, Lifeguard, Sega's Hatsune Miku's Project Diva, Chunithm New, Pop Team Epic, and Quintessential Quintuplets.

On 14 April 2022, a promotion was held for Sega's Initial D series 20th Anniversary. In an update, Bunta's Challenge was reintroduced. And play stamp cards distributed included keychains, start screen background, and tachometers that are reminiscent of the previous Arcade Stage titles, under neon, avatar pieces, and background tracks, two of which were made by Dave Rodgers and one from Sega that debuted in Arcade Stage 6 AA. The three background music were brought back two times in the next two play stamp cards rerun.

=== Special Stage ===
Initial D Special Stage was released on 26 June 2003, for the PlayStation 2 and was re-released on 26 February 2004, under the "PlayStation 2 the Best" label. Initial D Special Stage is based on Initial D Arcade Stage Ver.2 with additional Japanese voices for the first time and contains many features exclusive to this game. Initial D Special Stage is also the first home console Initial D game published by Sega.

This version contains a story mode that allows the player to reenact racing scenes from the Initial D manga series (up to Vol. 25 at the time of publication), as well as several new courses then not seen in the arcade versions of the game. In one of these courses, Shomaru went on to appear in Initial D Arcade Stage Ver.3/Street Stage. Real Myogi was later added back in Initial D Arcade Stage 4/Extreme Stage. Momiji Line would not return until Initial D Arcade Stage 8 Infinity. Bunta's Challenge is noticeably absent in the game. Additional features, including replays for saved time-attack records and Iketani's car introduction.

Due to PlayStation 2's hardware limitations, the graphics of the game was downgraded from its arcade counterpart. The game is compatible with Logitech's Driving Force wheel series, and other wheel controllers made for PlayStation 2. Sega also balanced all the cars in-game due to the overpowering Integra DC2 from Initial D Arcade Stage Ver.2.

=== Street Stage ===
Initial D Street Stage is a PSP-exclusive game based on Initial D Arcade Stage Ver.3. This game features Dogfight by M.o.v.e. as its intro theme, which is also used as the first opening theme of Initial D Fourth Stage. The legend of the street mode, which pits players against rival characters are the same as the arcade game, but Akina (Snow) is removed, meaning the battle with Miki is also removed, although his theme can be found in the game's BGM files.

=== Initial D Extreme Stage ===
Initial D Extreme Stage is a PlayStation 3 game based on Initial D Arcade Stage 4.

== Reception ==
Initial D Arcade Stage (2001) sold 2,534 hardware units in Japan up until 2004. Initial D Arcade Stage Ver. 3 sold 673 units between April 2004 and March 2005. Combined, both versions of the game sold approximately 3,207 units up until March 2005. At a price of $2,130, the game grossed approximately $7 million in hardware sales up until March 2005.

Initial D Arcade Stage 4 sold 3,904 units in 2007, including 3,056 units by March 2007, and 848 during April–September 2007. At a price of $4,250, the game grossed approximately $17 million in hardware sales up until 2007.

In total, the Initial D Arcade Stage series has sold approximately 7,111 hardware units in Japan up until 2007, grossing approximately $24 million in hardware sales.

In 2014, Patrick Michael, Sega Amusements' head of local R&D, explained Initial D's lack of popularity in Europe: "Games like Initial D, which is a fantastic driving game but it's a one-on-one race where you're either in first place or last place. In Japan it's very popular, but in Europe no-one wants to be in last place, really - you want a much more open road, more AI cars and more of a feeling of achievement."
