= Initial D Extreme Stage =

2008 video game

- Developer: Sega
- Publisher: Sega
- Platform: PlayStation 3
- Release: JP: July 3, 2008
- Genre: Racing
- Modes: Single-player, multiplayer

Initial D Extreme Stage (頭文字D エクストリーム ステージ, Inishyaru D ekusutorimu suteji) is a racing game developed by Sega for the PlayStation 3. It is based on the Japanese manga Initial D created by Shuichi Shigeno in 1995.

Initial D Extreme Stage was released in Japan, Hong Kong, Singapore, Taiwan and South Korea on July 3, 2008. Initial D Extreme Stage is the sequel to PlayStation 2's Initial D Special Stage and the PlayStation Portable's Initial D Street Stage. Initial D Extreme Stage is not region protected. It was released in two versions, the Japanese and the Asian version. They are both in Japanese, but the Asian version offers an English manual.

== Gameplay ==
The game bears much similarity to Initial D Arcade Stage 4 with tweaks and additions. Restrictions placed on the player in the arcade, such as allowing vehicle tuning after 3 IC card ejects, have been removed as there is now no IC card.

The online play is available with a PlayStation Network account. The Japanese PSNet account allows users to connect using Sega's All.Net. Online is usable for all regions, but only in the Japanese version. Online play has ranking races, free races, chatrooms used for initiating free races, and currently ranked player lists. The chatrooms offer a limited chatting capability but allow custom messages.

Ranking mode matches up players on the PlayStation 3 system. Game points are gained from all races, based on how the player performed. After the race the player's ranking meter will either increase or decrease according to things like match result, opponent ranking, and ranking points required for leveling up.

=== Modes ===
Initial D Extreme Stage offers two or three game modes, depending on what version it is.

- Legend of the Streets - like Initial D Arcade Stage 4, this is the game's story mode where the players face characters from the series in Happogahara (only console) despite the course being absent in the arcade.
- Time Attack - this mode allows the players to race any of 3 cars on any course in the game. This also allows them to collect points.
- Online Play - Japanese version only.

=== Tracks ===
All tracks have an up/downhill option (in/outbound for Happo and Tsukuba, counter/clockwise for Lake Akina, downhill/reverse for Iroha), day/night option, dry/wet option in Time Attack. In both Time Attack and Legend of the Street, the player has the option to change the music played during the race.

=== Download contents ===
Japanese players were given the option to download a free patch released later to unlock 3 cars that were added into IDAS4 version 1.5: RX-8, MX-5, and Altezza. Japanese players also have the option to buy two additional My Character Part add-ons, which if purchased gave them more character customization parts for ¥ 336 each.

Japanese PSN store also sold Initial D manga chapters for 300 yen each.
