= Initial D =

Japanese manga series by Shūichi Shigeno and its franchise

- First tankōbon volume cover, featuring Takumi Fujiwara and the Toyota Sprinter Trueno (AE86)

頭文字(イニシャル) D (Inisharu Dī)
- Genre: Action; Coming-of-age; Sports
- Manga
- Written by: Shuichi Shigeno
- Published by: Kodansha
- English publisher: NA: Tokyopop (former); Kodansha USA (current)
- Imprint: Young Magazine KC
- Magazine: Weekly Young Magazine
- Original run: July 17, 1995 – July 29, 2013
- Volumes: 48
Further information
Anime television series
Initial D First Stage
Directed by	Shin Misawa
Produced by	Ren Usami
Written by	Koji Kaneda
Music by	Ryuichi Katsumata
Studio	Studio Comet; Studio Gallop
Licensed by	AUS: Madman Entertainment; NA: Tokyopop (former); Crunchyroll (current); SEA: Medialink
Original network	Fuji TV
English network	AUS: Adult Swim; SEA: Animax Asia
Original run	April 19, 1998 – December 6, 1998
Episodes	26
Anime television series
Initial D Second Stage
Directed by	Shin'ichi Masaki
Produced by	Kayo Fukuda
Written by	Hiroshi Toda; Nobuaki Kishima
Music by	Ryuichi Katsumata
Studio	Pastel
Licensed by	AUS: Madman Entertainment; NA: Tokyopop (former); Crunchyroll (current); SEA: Medialink
Original network	Fuji TV
English network	SEA: Animax Asia
Original run	October 15, 1999 – January 21, 2000
Episodes	13
Original video animation
Initial D Extra Stage
Directed by	Shishi Yamaguchi
Written by	Hiroshi Toda; Nobuaki Kishima
Music by	Ryuichi Katsumata
Studio	Pastel
Licensed by	AUS: Madman Entertainment; NA: Tokyopop (former); Crunchyroll (current); SEA: Medialink
Released	November 10, 2000
Runtime	55 minutes
Episodes	2
Anime film
Initial D Third Stage
Directed by	Fumitsugu Yamaguchi
Produced by	Takayuki Nagasawa
Written by	Hiroshi Toda; Nobuaki Kishima
Music by	Ryuichi Katsumata
Studio	Studio Deen; Pastel (3DCG Production)
Licensed by	AUS: Madman Entertainment; NA: Crunchyroll; SEA: Medialink
Released	January 13, 2001
Runtime	105 minutes
Original video animation
Initial D Battle Stage
Directed by	Shishi Yamaguchi
Produced by	Takayuki Nagasawa
Written by	Hiroshi Toda; Nobuaki Kishima
Music by	Ryuichi Katsumata
Studio	Studio Deen
Released	May 15, 2002
Runtime	45 minutes
Anime television series
Initial D Fourth Stage
Directed by	Tsuneo Tominaga
Produced by	Kayo Fukuda
Written by	Hiroshi Toda; Nobuaki Kishima
Music by	Atsushi Umebori
Studio	A.C.G.T
Licensed by	AUS: Madman Entertainment; NA: Crunchyroll; SEA: Medialink
Original network	Perfect Choice
Original run	April 17, 2004 – February 18, 2006
Episodes	24
Original video animation
Initial D Battle Stage 2
Directed by	Tsuneo Tominaga
Written by	Hiroshi Toda; Nobuaki Kishima
Music by	Atsushi Umebori
Studio	A.C.G.T
Released	May 30, 2007
Runtime	78 minutes
Original video animation
Initial D Extra Stage 2
Directed by	Tsuneo Tominaga
Written by	Hiroshi Toda; Nobuaki Kishima
Music by	Atsushi Umebori
Studio	A.C.G.T
Released	October 3, 2008
Runtime	55 minutes
Anime television series
Initial D Fifth Stage
Directed by	Mitsuo Hashimoto
Produced by	Kayo Fukuda
Written by	Hiroshi Toda; Nobuaki Kishima
Music by	Atsushi Umebori
Studio	SynergySP
Original network	Perfect Choice Premier 1
Original run	November 9, 2012 – May 10, 2013
Episodes	14
Anime television series
Initial D Final Stage
Directed by	Mitsuo Hashimoto
Produced by	Kayo Fukuda
Written by	Hiroshi Toda; Nobuaki Kishima
Music by	Atsushi Umebori
Studio	SynergySP
Original network	Animax PPV (Animax Plus)
Original run	May 16, 2014 – June 22, 2014
Episodes	4
Films
Initial D (2005); New Initial D (2014–2016)
- Sequels
- MF Ghost (2017–2025); Subaru and Subaru (2025–present)
- icon

Initial D (Japanese: 頭文字(イニシャル) D, Hepburn: Inisharu Dī) is a Japanese manga series written and illustrated by Shuichi Shigeno. It was serialized in Kodansha's seinen manga magazine Weekly Young Magazine from 1995 to 2013, with the chapters collected into 48 tankōbon volumes. The story focuses on the world of illegal Japanese street racing, where all the action is concentrated in the mountain passes and rarely in cities or urban areas, and with the drifting racing style emphasized in particular. Professional race car driver and pioneer of drifting Keiichi Tsuchiya helped with editorial supervision. The story is centered on the prefecture of Gunma, more specifically on several mountains in the Kantō region and in their surrounding cities and towns. Although some of the names of the locations the characters race in have been fictionalized, all of the locations in the series are based on actual locations in Japan.

Initial D was adapted into an anime franchise which includes six main installments (five series and one feature film) labeled as Stages: First Stage (co-animated by Studio Comet and Studio Gallop) ran in 1998; Second Stage (animated by Pastel) ran from 1999 to 2000; Third Stage (feature film animated by Studio Deen) premiered in 2001; Fourth Stage (animated by A.C.G.T) ran from 2004 to 2006; Fifth Stage (animated by SynergySP) ran from 2012 to 2013; and Final Stage (animated by SynergySP) ran in 2014. An anime film trilogy retelling the beginning of the manga, New Initial D the Movie, animated by Sanzigen and Liden Films, was released from 2014 to 2016. A live action film by Avex and Media Asia was released in 2005. Several video games based on the series have also been released.

Both the manga and anime series were initially licensed for English-language distribution in North America by Tokyopop; the anime series later acquired by Funimation (later Crunchyroll), while the manga was re-licensed by Kodansha USA.

By April 2021, Initial D had over 55 million copies in circulation, making it one of the best-selling manga series in history. Initial D has been followed by the manga series MF Ghost (2017–2025) and Subaru and Subaru (since 2025).

== Plot ==
The first battle of the series, Keisuke Takahashi (FD3S) vs. Takumi Fujiwara (AE86), as seen in the anime

Takumi Fujiwara is a high school student working part-time at a gas station in Gunma Prefecture alongside his friend Itsuki Takeuchi and their supervisor, Koichiro Iketani, leader of the local Akina Speed Stars racing team. Unbeknownst to them, Takumi has spent years honing his driving skills while making early morning tofu deliveries for his father Bunta in their aging Toyota Sprinter Trueno (AE86).

The racing scene in Gunma is disrupted when the Red Suns, a formidable team from Mount Akagi led by Ryosuke Takahashi, challenge the Speed Stars to a downhill race on Mount Akina. After witnessing the Red Suns' superior performance, the Speed Stars grow demoralized. Later that night, Keisuke Takahashi, the team's second-in-command driving a high-powered Mazda RX-7, is unexpectedly defeated by a mysterious Sprinter Trueno. Investigations point to Bunta as the driver, but when Iketani crashes during practice and begs for his help, Bunta declines before secretly arranging for Takumi to race in his place. Utilizing an unorthodox "gutter run" technique—placing the car's wheels in the road's drainage channels to maintain speed through hairpin corners—Takumi soundly defeats Keisuke.

The victory establishes Takumi as the "Legendary Eight-Six of Akina", attracting challengers from across the region. Though initially indifferent, Takumi gradually develops a passion for racing. His skills are tested when he faces the Emperors, a team specializing in Mitsubishi Lancer Evolutions. Outmatched by their superior machinery, Takumi loses to their leader, Kyoichi Sudo, and blows his engine in the process. The Red Suns intervene, defeating the Emperors and preserving Gunma's racing reputation. Bunta replaces the AE86's engine, and with guidance from friends, Takumi refines his technique. He later graduates from high school but continues racing, defeating rivals such as Wataru Akiyama in a Toyota Levin and avenging his loss against Kyoichi on the latter's home course, the Nikko Irohazaka. He also overcomes the son of Bunta's old rival, who drives a Toyota MR2 (SW20). A personal crisis arises when his girlfriend Natsuki Mogi is kidnapped, leading to a dramatic rescue at Lake Akina during winter, though their relationship eventually ends amicably.

Seeking greater challenges, Takumi joins Project D, an expeditionary racing team founded by Ryosuke and Keisuke Takahashi, aiming to prove himself as the fastest driver in Japan. The team faces numerous opponents, including skilled racers from Todo Racing School, the Northern Saitama Alliance, and the underhanded Tsuchisaka Lancer Evolution team. During this time, Takumi is humbled when his father, driving a Subaru Impreza WRX STI, defeats him, forcing him to adapt to four-wheel-drive dynamics. He also develops a relationship with Mika Uehara, while Ryosuke confronts a bitter rival tied to a past tragedy.

Project D's campaign culminates in a climactic race against Shinji Inui of Team Sidewinder. Despite blowing his engine mid-race, Takumi coasts backward across the finish line to secure victory. He retires the AE86 from competition, opting to restore it gradually. Ryosuke disbands Project D, revealing the meaning behind its name and shifting focus to mentoring new drivers. Keisuke pursues professional racing, while Takumi resumes tofu deliveries in his father's Subaru.

Years later, Takumi transitions to rally racing, eventually becoming a world champion; this would lead to the events of MF Ghost, another series by Shigeno.

== Media ==
The Initial D franchise logo

=== Manga ===
Written and illustrated by Shuichi Shigeno, Initial D was serialized for eighteen years by Kodansha in the seinen manga magazine Weekly Young Magazine, starting on the July 17, 1995, issue, (Note: It started in the magazine's 30th issue of 1995, with cover date July 17.) and concluded on July 29, 2013. Kodansha collected its 719 individual chapters in forty-eight tankōbon volumes, released from November 6, 1995, to November 6, 2013.

In North America, the manga was licensed for English release by Tokyopop (along with the anime series) in 2001. The company changed the names of the characters in the anime edition, and subsequently changed them in the manga to match. These name changes matched the name changes that Sega implemented into the Western releases of the Initial D Arcade Stage video games. Tokyopop also censored the brief sex scenes from the original manga. In addition, "street slang" was interlaced in translations. The company released 33 volumes from May 21, 2002, to January 13, 2009, before it announced in August 2009 that its manga licensing contracts with Kodansha had expired. In April 2019, ComiXology and Kodansha USA announced that they had released volumes 1 to 38 digitally, while volumes 39 to 48 were released in July of the same year. In August 2023, Kodansha USA announced that it would be re-releasing the manga in an omnibus format with new translation and lettering beginning in 2024. The first volume was released on March 19, 2024; it had three cover variants: a new cover made by Kodansha USA, a Crunchyroll and direct market exclusive variant, and a Kinokuniya Books variant. As of September 1, 2026, eleven volumes have been released.

=== Anime ===
The first anime television series adaptation of Initial D (referred to retroactively as Initial D First Stage) was produced by OB Planning and Avex Entertainment and co-animated by Studio Gallop and Studio Comet. It was broadcast for 26 episodes on Fuji TV from April 19 to December 6, 1998. (Note: The series air date was regularly listed on Saturday at 27:20, which is effectively Sunday at 3:20 a.m. JST.)

A second series, Initial D Second Stage, animated by Pastel, was broadcast for 13 episodes on Fuji TV from October 15, 1999, to January 21, 2000. (Note: The series air date was regularly listed on Thursday at 25:45, which is effectively Friday at 2:45 a.m. JST.) A two-episode original video animation (OVA), Initial D Extra Stage, was released by Avex on November 10, 2000.

A 104-minute anime film, Initial D Third Stage, animated by Studio Deen and distributed by Toei Company, premiered on January 13, 2001. A compilation of the 17 races featured across the first three Stage series, Initial D Battle Stage, was released by Avex on May 15, 2002; mainly focusing on music and racing scenes, it features reanimated and remastered scenes with more advanced animation techniques, as well as a new original race.

A third anime series, Initial D Fourth Stage, animated by A.C.G.T, ran for 24 episodes on SKY PerfecTV!'s Perfect Choice pay-per-view service from April 17, 2004, to February 18, 2006. A follow-up OVA to Initial D Extra Stage, Initial D Extra Stage 2, was released on SKY PerfecTV! on October 3, 2008, before being released on DVD by Avex on December 5 of that same year. A compilation of Fourth Stage, including new scenes not featured in the series, Initial D Battle Stage 2, was released by Avex on May 30, 2007.

A fourth anime series, Initial D Fifth Stage, animated by SynergySP, ran for 14 episodes; it was previewed on Animax on November 4, 2012, and later ran on SKY PerfecTV!'s Perfect Choice Premier 1 channel from November 9, 2012, to May 10, 2013.

The fifth and final series, Initial D Final Stage, once again animated by SynergySP, ran for four episodes, which were released on Animax's video on demand service, Animax Plus, from May 16 to June 22, 2014. A compilation of Fifth Stage and Final Stage, Initial D Battle Stage 3, was released on March 5, 2021; unlike the previous two Battle Stages, this does not feature any new scenes or character dialogue.

A film trilogy retelling the beginning of the manga, New Initial D the Movie, animated by Sanzigen and Liden Films, was released from 2014 to 2016. The first film, Awakening, premiered on August 23, 2014; the second film, Racer, premiered on May 23, 2015; the third film, Dream, premiered on February 6, 2016. A compilation of the trilogy, New Initial D the Movie: Battle Digest, was released on January 7, 2022.

==== English release ====
In North America, the anime series was licensed by Tokyopop in 2001. The company released First Stage, Second Stage, and Extra Stage across fourteen DVDs from September 16, 2003, to November 8, 2005. Tokyopop altered the series for Western audiences by modifying names, adding slang, and replacing the characteristic eurobeat music with original rap and hip-hop tracks produced by Tokyopop CEO and an in-house musician, Stu Levy (DJ Milky).

An English-subtitled version of Third Stage was screened it at the Big Apple Anime Fest on August 29, 2003. Tokyopop never released it on DVD, despite having mentioned in 2006 plans to release a "theatrical movie-length animated feature" in the near future.

In 2006, Funimation announced that it would be distributing the Tokyopop DVDs. The company released First Stage and Second Stages in two separate box sets; First Stage was released on March 13, 2007, and Second Stage on October 16 of that same year. At the New York Anime Festival 2009, Funimation announced that it would be re-releasing and re-dubbing First Stage, Second Stage, Extra Stage, Third Stage, and Fourth Stage. Their release included a brand new English dub and retained the original music from the Japanese in an uncut format. Funimation first released Third Stage on May 11, 2010; Fourth Stage was released in two sets on May 11 and June 29, 2010, respectively; First Stage was released in two sets on September 21 and November 16, 2010, respectively; Second Stage and Extra Stage were released in a single set on February 1, 2011. Following the announcement that Funimation would be unified under the Crunchyroll brand, the series (including First Stage to Fourth Stage and Extra Stage) began streaming on the platform in May 2022; however, the episodes are no longer available on the platform.

=== Video games ===
- Initial D Gaiden (1998): Game Boy
- Initial D Koudou Saisoku Densetsu (1999): Sega Saturn
- Initial D (1999): PS1
- Initial D: Ryosuke Takahashi's Fastest Typing-theory (2000/2001): PC/Mac & PS2
- Initial D Second Stage: Fastest Typing in Kanto Project (2001): PC/Mac
- Initial D Arcade Stage / Initial D (2002): Arcade (NAOMI 2)
- Initial D Another Stage (2002): GBA
- Initial D Arcade Stage Ver.2 / Initial D Ver.2 (2003): Arcade (NAOMI 2)
- Initial D Collectible Card Game (2003): Collectible Card Game
- Initial D Special Stage (2003): PS2
- Initial D Mountain Vengeance (2004): PC
- Initial D Arcade Stage 3/Initial D Version 3 (2004): Arcade (NAOMI 2)
- Initial D Street Stage (2006): PSP
- Initial D Arcade Stage 4 / Initial D 4 (2006): Arcade (Lindbergh)
- Initial D Arcade Stage 4 Limited (2007): Arcade (Lindbergh)
- Initial D Arcade Stage 4 Kai (2008): Arcade (Lindbergh)
- Initial D Extreme Stage (2008): PS3
- Initial D Arcade Stage 5 (2009): Arcade (Lindbergh)
- Initial D Arcade Stage 6 AA (2011): Arcade (RingEdge)
- Initial D Arcade Stage 7 AAX (2012): Arcade (RingEdge)
- Initial D Arcade Stage 8 ∞ (Infinity) (2014): Arcade (RingEdge/RingEdge 2)
- Initial D: Perfect Shift Online (2014): Nintendo 3DS eShop (free-to-play)
- Initial D Arcade Stage Zero (2017): Arcade (Sega Nu2)
- Initial D RPG: Sony Ericsson mobile phone
- Initial D Pachislot (2021): Arcade
- Initial D The Arcade (2021): Arcade (ALLS)
- P Initial D (2022): Arcade

=== Live-action film ===
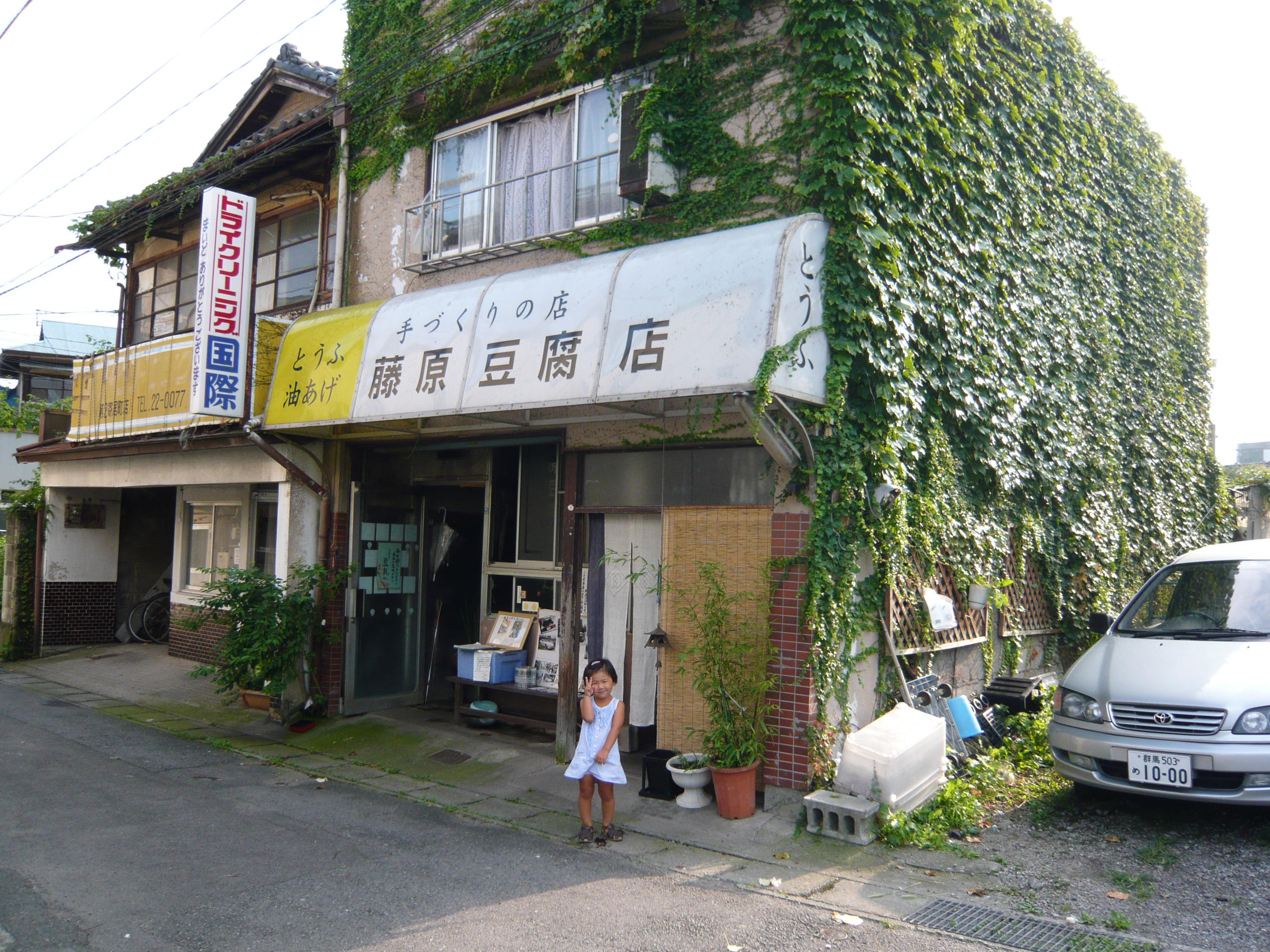
Fujino Store Tofu Shop in Gunma, which was renamed and modeled as the Fujiwara Tofu Shop for the live-action film

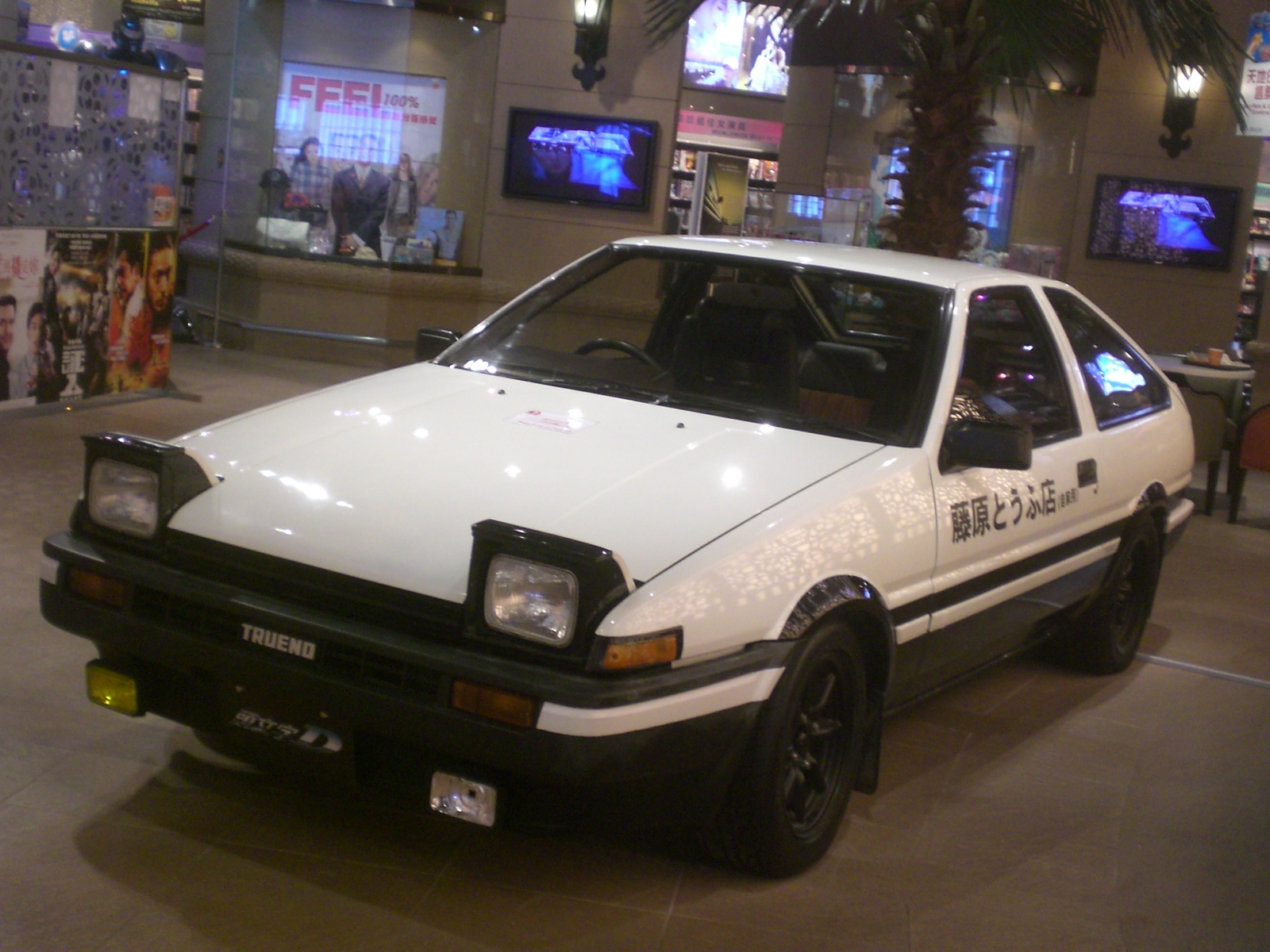
A replica of Takumi's AE86

A live-action film based on Initial D was released on June 23, 2005, in Asia. The film was jointly produced by Japan's Avex Inc. and Hong Kong's Media Asia Group. It was directed by Andrew Lau and Alan Mak, whose credits include the 2002 Hong Kong blockbuster Infernal Affairs. The adaptation featured Taiwanese singer Jay Chou as Takumi Fujiwara and Hong Kong stars Edison Chen as Ryosuke Takahashi and Shawn Yue as Takeshi Nakazato. Despite many changes to the original plot, the film was met with generally positive reviews and was nominated for multiple awards, including Best Picture, at the Hong Kong Film Awards and Golden Horse Awards, winning many of them.

In October 2023, actor Sung Kang stated that he is working on developing another live-action film and is "trying" to direct it.

== Reception ==
By July 2013, collected tankōbon volumes of the Initial D manga series had sold 48 million copies. By April 2021, Initial D had over 55 million copies in circulation.

Initial D received praise. The Anime Review rated it A−, with the reviewer calling it "simply the best show I've seen in a long time." Bamboo Dong of Anime News Network rated it B−, stating it "is the first time in a long while since I've been so fired up about a series, so I recommend to everyone to at least check this out." Some fans of Initial D reacted negatively to the Tokyopop's extensive editing and changes made in the English-language version of the manga. Similar reactions were made towards their English dub's script and voice acting, and the removal of the original music from the anime series. Tokyopop said that it was trying to Americanize the series so it could be aired on television, while at the same time keeping the Japanese spirit of the series.

Reviews of the Funimation re-release of the anime note a marked improvement from the Tokyopop iteration, with most complaints leveled against the lack of anamorphic widescreen on the DVDs. Initial D has drawn comparisons to the later Fast & Furious film franchise (debuted 2001), particularly The Fast and the Furious: Tokyo Drift (2006), for which Initial D's consultant, Keiichi Tsuchiya, served as a stunt coordinator and also made a cameo appearance in the film as a fisherman.

== See also ==
- Wangan Midnight, another car racing-themed manga by Michiharu Kusunoki, focusing on highway racing in Tokyo's Bayshore Route
