= Subaru (name) =

Subaru (written 昴 in kanji, すばる in hiragana, or スバル in katakana) is the Japanese name for the Pleiades star cluster. It is primarily a masculine given name in Japanese. Notable people with the name include:

- Subaru Kimura (木村 昴; born 1990), Japanese voice actor and singer
- Subaru Nishimura (西村 昴; born 2003), Japanese footballer
- Subaru Shibutani (渋谷 すばる; born 1981), a former member of Kanjani∞
- Subaru Takahashi (高橋 昴; 1902–1992), Japanese cross-country skier

== Fictional characters ==
- Ryoko Subaru, a character in Martian Successor Nadesico
- Subaru, a character in Maid-sama!
- Subaru, a character in .hack//SIGN
- Subaru, a Byakko celestial warrior in Fushigi Yūgi
- Subaru Akehoshi, a character in the game franchise Ensemble Stars!
- Subaru Awa, drummer of Togenashi Togeari, the fictional band of Girls Band Cry’s main characters
- Subaru Hasegawa, a main character in the light novel and anime series Ro-Kyu-Bu!
- Subaru Hoshikawa (Geo Stelar in the English translation), a character in Mega Man Star Force
- Subaru Hoshina, a character in The Fragrant Flower Blooms with Dignity
- Subaru Kagami, captain of House Hotarubi, a character in the game Tokyo Debunker
- Subaru Konoe, the lead character and female protagonist in Mayo Chiki
- Subaru Mikage, a character in Comic Party
- Subaru Mikazuki, the lead character in My Roommate is a Cat
- Subaru Mitejima, a character in the manga series Twin Star Exorcists
- Subaru Miyamoto, a character in the manga Subaru
- Subaru Nagayoshi, a character in The Idolmaster Million Live!
- Subaru Nakajima, a character in Magical Girl Lyrical Nanoha Strikers
- Subaru Natsuki, protagonist of the light novel series Re:Zero − Starting Life in Another World
- Subaru Oozora, Hololive member
- Subaru Sakamaki, a character in Diabolik Lovers
- Subaru Shinjo, a character in the Battle Arena Toshinden fighting game series
- Subaru Sumeragi, a character in Tokyo Babylon, X/1999 and Tsubasa: Reservoir Chronicle
- Subaru Tachibana, a main character in the manga series Stray Human
- Subaru Yagi, a character in the manga series Hot Gimmick
