= Subaru and Subaru =

Japanese manga series

- First tankōbon volume cover, featuring Subaru Sato and the Subaru BRZ (ZD8)

昴と彗星 (Subaru to Subaru)
- Manga
- Written by: Shuichi Shigeno
- Published by: Kodansha
- English publisher: NA: Kodansha USA
- Imprint: Young Magazine KC
- Magazine: Weekly Young Magazine
- Original run: July 22, 2025 – present
- Volumes: 4
- Preceded by
- Initial D (1995–2013); MF Ghost (2017–2025)
- icon

Subaru and Subaru (Japanese: 昴と彗星, Hepburn: Subaru to Subaru) is a Japanese manga series written and illustrated by Shuichi Shigeno. It is a sequel to Shigeno's manga series Initial D and MF Ghost. It started in Kodansha's seinen manga magazine Weekly Young Magazine in July 2025.

== Synopsis ==
Some time after the events of MF Ghost, a new qualifying racing championship called MFG Freshman Series (MFGフレッシュマンシリーズ, Emu Efu Jī Furesshuman Shirīzu) begins. Two young contenders, a recently graduated high school karting champion named Subaru Sato (佐藤 昴, Satō Subaru), and a young man named Subaru Kudo (工藤 彗星, Kudō Subaru), end up competing in it.

== Publication ==
Written and illustrated by Shuichi Shigeno, Subaru and Subaru started in Kodansha's seinen manga magazine Weekly Young Magazine on July 22, 2025. It is a sequel to Shigeno's manga series Initial D and MF Ghost. Kodansha released its first tankōbon volume on November 6, 2025. As of November 6, 2026, four volumes have been released.

Kodansha added the series to its K Manga online platform's catalog on August 24, 2025. During its panel at San Diego Comic-Con in July 2026, Kodansha USA announced that it had licensed the series for English publication, with the first volume set to release in Q2 2027.

| No. | Japanese release date | Japanese ISBN |
|---|---|---|
| 1 | November 6, 2025 | 978-4-06-541259-6 |
1. "The Ghost of Akina" (秋名の幽霊); 2. "Horror!! Iketani Wrecks His Ride" (池谷痛恨!!クルマぼっこす); 3. "Fumihiro the Attention Seeker" (出たがり史浩); 4. "The High-Speed Granny vs. Subaru" (高速ババアvs.昴); 5. "This Ghost Is Too Damn Fast!" (幽霊 速すぎるんだべ); 6. "The Headliner Arrives" (真打ち登場); 7. "The High-Speed Granny vs. the Chosen One" (高速ばばあvs.天上天下唯我独尊); 8. "The 'Comet'" (キラキラネーム); 9. "The Gunsai Seminar" (群サイセミナー)
| 2 | March 6, 2026 | 978-4-06-542914-3 |
10. "The Aura of an Ace" (エースの風格); 11. "Odawara Pikes Peak" (小田原パイクスピーク); 12. "Destiny's Dawn – One Number Off" (運命の序章 ひとつちがいのゼッケン); 13. "The Worst Meet-Cute Ever" (最悪なボーイミーツガール); 14. "The Lucky Find" (掘り出しもの); 15. "The Debut Approaches" (開幕 迫る); 16. "The Ghost Debuts" (ゴースト出現); 17. "The DNA of Driving Skill" (ドラテクのDNA); 18. "Subaru Heads Out" (彗星 出走); 19. "The Legendary 'Only One'" (伝説のオンリーワン); 20. "Subaru Sato's Challenge" (佐藤昴の挑戦)
| 3 | July 6, 2026 | 978-4-06-544246-3 |
21. "Lineage of Legends" (レジェンド達の系譜); 22. "Auntie Mako" (真子叔母ちゃん); 23. "Two Contenders" (2人の優勝候補); 24. "The Race Begins" (決勝スタート); 25. "First-Lap Maneuvers" (1周目のかけひき); 26. "Subaru Goes For It!" (すばる 行く!!); 27. "I Don't Believe In Rearview Mirrors" (バックミラーなんて見ないんさ); 28. "Dumber than the Apes at Gunsai" (群サイの猿よりバカ); 29. "Ichiro Gondo Makes His Move" (勝負に出る権藤市郎); 30. "Into Lap 2" (2周目へ); 31. "Imparting a Not-So-Simple Plan" (易しくない作戦伝授)
| 4 | November 6, 2026 | 978-4-06-545653-8 |
32. "The Dogfight" (格闘戦); 33. "Defeating That Bald-Ass Freak" (ちゃびん社長をやっつけろ); 34. "The Free-For-All" (大混戦); 35. "Grown-Ups Play So Dirty" (大人は汚いべ); 36. "Coulthard's Strategy" (クルサードの作戦); 37. "Coulthard Ups the Pace" (クルサード 動く); 38. "Subaru Kudo's Thoughts" (工藤彗星の思考); 39. "Momo Sakura's Indecision" (佐倉桃の逡巡); 40. "Into the Final Lap" (ファイナルラップへ); 41. "They Call It the Death Zone" (その名もデスエリア); 42. "Coalition vs. Coordination" (共闘vs連係)

=== Chapters not yet in tankōbon format ===
- 43. "Take Down Yujiro Sekiya! (And Stay Away, Kudo!)" (関谷裕次郎をやっつけろ‥工藤は来るな)
- 44. "Ichi-Gon vs. Akaba" (ゴンイチvs.赤羽陸斗)
- 45. "The Less-than-Noble Voice Count" (残念すぎるボイスカウント)
- 46. "The Woods Section" (林間区間)
- 47. "The New Focus Flags" (追加される注目フラグ)

== Reception ==
The first volume debuted third at Oricon's weekly manga ranking, with 48,658 copies sold.
